= List of Epidendrum species =

As of May 2023, Plants of the World Online accepted 1834 species of orchid in the genus Epidendrum, plus 12 hybrids.

== A ==
- Epidendrum abbottii L.Sánchez & Hágsater
- Epidendrum aberrans Schltr.
- Epidendrum acjanacoense Hágsater, E.Santiago & J.Duarte
- Epidendrum ackermanii Hágsater
- Epidendrum acreense (Brieger & Bicalho) Christenson
- Epidendrum acroamparoanum Hágsater & L.Sánchez
- Epidendrum acrobatesii Hágsater & Dodson
- Epidendrum acrolithophilum Hágsater & E.Santiago
- Epidendrum acrorhodum Hágsater & Dodson
- Epidendrum acroscopeum Hágsater & Dodson
- Epidendrum actinoglossum Hágsater & E.Santiago
- Epidendrum acuminatisepalum Hágsater, E.Santiago & Gal.-Tar.
- Epidendrum acuminatum Ruiz & Pav.
- Epidendrum acunae Dressler
- Epidendrum acutilobum Hágsater & Uribe Vélez
- Epidendrum acutissimum Lindl.
- Epidendrum adamsii Hágsater & Dodson
- Epidendrum addae Pabst
- Epidendrum adenoglossum Lindl.
- Epidendrum adnatum Ames & C.Schweinf.
- Epidendrum adolfomorenoi R.Vásquez & Ibisch
- Epidendrum adsettii Serracín, J.S.Harrison, Bogarín & Sánchez Sald.
- Epidendrum aenigmaticum Hágsater & Dodson
- Epidendrum aeolicum Karremans
- Epidendrum agathosmicum Rchb.f.
- Epidendrum aggregatum Lindl.
- Epidendrum agoyanense Hágsater & Dodson
- Epidendrum aguaricoense Hágsater & Dodson
- Epidendrum aguirrei Hágsater
- Epidendrum aida-alvareziae Hágsater
- Epidendrum alabastrialatum Pollard ex Hágsater
- Epidendrum albazoense Hágsater & Salas Guerr.
- Epidendrum alberti Schltr.
- Epidendrum albifloroides D.E.Benn. & Christenson
- Epidendrum albiforum Schltr.
- Epidendrum albomarginatum Rchb.f.
- Epidendrum albopropinquum Hágsater & E.Santiago
- Epidendrum alejandrinae Hágsater & H.R.Quispe
- Epidendrum alejandroi Archila & Chiron
- Epidendrum alexii Hágsater & Dodson
- Epidendrum alfaroi Ames & C.Schweinf.
- Epidendrum alfonsopozoi Hágsater & Dodson
- Epidendrum alfredii Schltr.
- Epidendrum alieniferum Karremans & Bogarín
- Epidendrum allenii L.O.Williams
- Epidendrum allisonii Hágsater & Dodson
- Epidendrum allochronum Hágsater
- Epidendrum alopecurum Schltr.
- Epidendrum alpicola Rchb.f. & Warsz.
- Epidendrum alpicolonigrense Hágsater & Dodson
- Epidendrum alpicoloscandens Hágsater & Dodson
- Epidendrum alsum Ridl.
- Epidendrum althaniorum Hágsater & Collantes
- Epidendrum althausenii A.D.Hawkes
- Epidendrum alticola Ames & Correll
- Epidendrum altomayocapitellatum Hágsater & Edquén
- Epidendrum alvarezdeltoroi Hágsater
- Epidendrum amapense Hágsater & L.Sánchez
- Epidendrum amaruense Hágsater, Collantes & E.Santiago
- Epidendrum amayense Hágsater
- Epidendrum amazonicoriifolium Hágsater
- Epidendrum amblostomoides Hoehne
- Epidendrum amblyantherum Hágsater & E.Santiago
- Epidendrum amethystinum Rchb.f.
- Epidendrum ammophilum Barb.Rodr.
- Epidendrum amoanum Zambrano & Solano
- Epidendrum ampelomelanoxeros Hágsater, E.Santiago & E.Parra
- Epidendrum ampelospathum Hágsater & Dodson
- Epidendrum amphistomum A.Rich.
- Epidendrum amphorastele Hágsater, A.G.Diaz & E.Santiago
- Epidendrum amplexicaule Lindl.
- Epidendrum amplexigastrium Hágsater & Dodson
- Epidendrum amplexipetalum Hágsater & H.Medina
- Epidendrum amplexirisaraldense Hágsater & E.Santiago
- Epidendrum ampliracemum C.Schweinf.
- Epidendrum amplum D.E.Benn. & Christenson
- Epidendrum anastasioi Hágsater
- Epidendrum anatipedium L.M.Sánchez & Hágsater
- Epidendrum anceps Jacq.
- Epidendrum anchinocturnum Hágsater
- Epidendrum ancipitinocturnum Hágsater & J.M.P.Cordeiro
- Epidendrum ancipitosum Hágsater & E.Santiago
- Epidendrum ancirotylosum Hágsater & E.Santiago
- Epidendrum ancistronum Hágsater & Dodson
- Epidendrum anderssonii Hágsater & Dodson
- Epidendrum andinum Carnevali & G.A.Romero
- Epidendrum andreettae Hágsater & Dodson
- Epidendrum andrei Hágsater & L.Sánchez
- Epidendrum andres-johnsonii Hágsater & E.Santiago
- Epidendrum angaritae Hágsater
- Epidendrum angeloglossum Hágsater & Dodson
- Epidendrum angulatum Hágsater & J.Duarte
- Epidendrum angustatum (T.Hashim.) Dodson
- Epidendrum angustilobopaniculatum Hágsater & Dodson
- Epidendrum angustilobum Fawc. & Rendle
- Epidendrum angustisegmentum (L.O.Williams) Hágsater
- Epidendrum angustissimum Lindl.
- Epidendrum anisatum Lex.
- Epidendrum anitae Schltr.
- Epidendrum annabellae Nir
- Epidendrum anoglossoides Ames & C.Schweinf.
- Epidendrum anoglossum Schltr.
- Epidendrum anthoceroides Hágsater & Dodson
- Epidendrum anthoceros Linden & Rchb.f.
- Epidendrum anthropophorum Rchb.f.
- Epidendrum antillanum Ackerman & Hágsater
- Epidendrum antonense Hágsater
- Epidendrum apaganoides D.E.Benn. & Christenson
- Epidendrum apaganum Mansf.
- Epidendrum apatotylosum Hágsater
- Epidendrum apicilatum Hágsater, E.Santiago & Uribe Vélez
- Epidendrum aporoides F.Lehm. & Kraenzl.
- Epidendrum appendiculatum T.Hashim.
- Epidendrum apuahuense Mansf.
- Epidendrum aquaticoides C.Schweinf.
- Epidendrum aquilalatum Hágsater & E.Santiago
- Epidendrum arachnoglossum Rchb.f. ex André
- Epidendrum arbuscula Lindl.
- Epidendrum archilarum Chiron
- Epidendrum ardens Kraenzl.
- Epidendrum arevaloi (Schltr.) Hágsater
- Epidendrum arevaloides Hágsater & Dodson
- Epidendrum ariasii Hágsater & Dodson
- Epidendrum aristatum Ackerman & Montalvo
- Epidendrum aristisepalum Hágsater & Dodson
- Epidendrum aristoloides Hágsater & Dodson
- Epidendrum armeniacum Lindl.
- Epidendrum arnoldii Schltr.
- Epidendrum aromoense Cornejo & Hágsater
- Epidendrum artelirioi Xim.Bols.
- Epidendrum asplundii Hágsater & Dodson
- Epidendrum astetei Hágsater, Collantes & Mormontoy
- Epidendrum astroselaginella Hágsater & E.Santiago
- Epidendrum atacazoicum Schltr.
- Epidendrum atonum Hágsater & Dodson
- Epidendrum atrobrunneum Schltr.
- Epidendrum atrorugosum Hágsater
- Epidendrum atroscriptum Hágsater
- Epidendrum attenuatum Lindl.
- Epidendrum atwoodchlamys Hágsater
- Epidendrum atwoodii Hágsater & L.Sánchez
- Epidendrum atypicum Hágsater & E.Santiago
- Epidendrum aura-usecheae Hágsater, Rinc.-Useche & O.Pérez
- Epidendrum aureoglobiflorum Hágsater & Dodson
- Epidendrum aurigineum Barringer
- Epidendrum aurimurinus Hágsater, E.Santiago & Gal.-Tar.
- Epidendrum avicula Lindl.
- Epidendrum aylacotoglossum Hágsater
- Epidendrum azuayense Hágsater & E.Santiago
- Epidendrum azulense D.E.Benn. & Christenson

== B ==
- Epidendrum badium Hágsater
- Epidendrum baezense Hágsater & Dodson
- Epidendrum bahorucense Hágsater & L.Cerv.
- Epidendrum bakrense Hágsater & G.Cremers
- Epidendrum ballonii Christenson
- Epidendrum bambusaceum Schltr.
- Epidendrum bambusiforme Kraenzl.
- Epidendrum bambusitricolor Hágsater & Collantes
- Epidendrum barbae Rchb.f.
- Epidendrum barbaricum Hágsater & Dodson
- Epidendrum barbeyanum Kraenzl.
- Epidendrum barronegrense Ocupa & Hágsater
- Epidendrum baryanthum Hágsater & Salas Guerr.
- Epidendrum batesii Dodson
- Epidendrum baumannianum Schltr.
- Epidendrum beatricis Hágsater & Uribe Vélez
- Epidendrum beatricis-vasqueziae Hágsater, J.S.Moreno & J.Duarte
- Epidendrum becerrae Hágsater & E.Santiago
- Epidendrum beharorum Hágsater
- Epidendrum belloi Hágsater
- Epidendrum × belmillerae Campacci & Rosim
- Epidendrum belmontense V.P.Castro & Marçal
- Epidendrum bennettii Dodson
- Epidendrum berbicense Hágsater & L.Sánchez
- Epidendrum bermejoense Muruaga & Parrado
- Epidendrum bernoullii Rchb.f. ex Hágsater & L.Sánchez
- Epidendrum betancurii Hágsater & E.Santiago
- Epidendrum betimianum Barb.Rodr.
- Epidendrum bianthogastrium Hágsater & Dodson
- Epidendrum bicentenarium Karremans & Gil-Amaya
- Epidendrum bicirrhatum D.E.Benn. & Christenson
- Epidendrum bicuniculatum Hágsater & E.Santiago
- Epidendrum bidens D.E.Benn. & Christenson
- Epidendrum bifarium Sw.
- Epidendrum biforatum Lindl.
- Epidendrum bilobatum Ames
- Epidendrum binasum Hágsater & E.Santiago
- Epidendrum birostratum C.Schweinf.
- Epidendrum bispathulatum Hágsater, O.Pérez & E.Santiago
- Epidendrum bisulcatum Ames
- Epidendrum bitriangulare Sierra-Ariza, J.S.Moreno & Hágsater
- Epidendrum bivalve Lindl.
- Epidendrum blancheanum Urb.
- Epidendrum blepharichilum Kraenzl.
- Epidendrum blepharistes Barker ex Lindl.
- Epidendrum blepharoclinium Rchb.f.
- Epidendrum boekei Hágsater
- Epidendrum bogarinii Karremans & C.M.Sm.
- Epidendrum bogotense Schltr.
- Epidendrum bolbophylloides F.Lehm. & Kraenzl.
- Epidendrum bolivianum Schltr.
- Epidendrum bonitense Hágsater & Dodson
- Epidendrum borchsenii Hágsater & Dodson
- Epidendrum borealistachyum Hágsater, E.Santiago & C.F.Fernández
- Epidendrum boricuarum Hágsater & L.Sánchez
- Epidendrum boricuomutelianum Hágsater & L.Sánchez
- Epidendrum boscoense Hágsater & Dodson
- Epidendrum bothryanthum M.R.Miranda, F.J.de Jesus, Chiron & Hágsater
- Epidendrum boyacaense (Szlach. & Kolan.) J.M.H.Shaw
- Epidendrum boylei Hágsater & Dodson
- Epidendrum braccigerum Rchb.f.
- Epidendrum brachyanthum Hágsater & Dodson
- Epidendrum brachyblastum Hágsater & Dodson
- Epidendrum brachybotrys Ackerman & Montalvo
- Epidendrum brachybulbum F.Lehm. & Kraenzl.
- Epidendrum brachyclinium Hágsater & García-Cruz
- Epidendrum brachycorymbosum Hágsater & Dodson
- Epidendrum brachyglossum Lindl.
- Epidendrum brachyoothistachyum Hágsater & E.Santiago
- Epidendrum brachypodum Hágsater
- Epidendrum brachyrepens Hágsater
- Epidendrum brachyrhodochilum Hágsater & E.Santiago
- Epidendrum brachyschistum Schltr.
- Epidendrum brachystele Schltr.
- Epidendrum brachystelestachyum Hágsater, E.Santiago & Reina-Rodr.
- Epidendrum bracteolatum C.Presl
- Epidendrum bracteostigma Hágsater & García-Cruz
- Epidendrum bracteosum Ames & C.Schweinf.
- Epidendrum bractiacuminatum Hágsater & Dodson
- Epidendrum brassavoliforme F.Lehm. & Kraenzl.
- Epidendrum brenesii Schltr.
- Epidendrum brevicallosum Hágsater & E.Santiago
- Epidendrum brevicaule Schltr.
- Epidendrum brevicernuum Hágsater & Dodson
- Epidendrum brevivenioides Hágsater & Dodson
- Epidendrum brevivenium Lindl.
- Epidendrum breviyacuriense Hágsater, H.Medina & J.Duarte
- Epidendrum bricenoorum Damian & Hágsater
- Epidendrum bryophilum Hágsater & Dodson
- Epidendrum bucararicense Kraenzl.
- Epidendrum buchtienii Schltr.
- Epidendrum buenaventurae F.Lehm. & Kraenzl.
- Epidendrum bugabense Hágsater
- Epidendrum burtonii D.E.Benn. & Christenson

== C ==
- Epidendrum caeciliae P.Ortiz & Hágsater
- Epidendrum caesaris Hágsater & E.Santiago
- Epidendrum calacaliense Hágsater & Dodson
- Epidendrum calagrense Hágsater & Dodson
- Epidendrum calanthum Rchb.f. & Warsz.
- Epidendrum caldense Barb.Rodr.
- Epidendrum caligarium Rchb.f.
- Epidendrum calimaense J.S.Moreno & Hágsater
- Epidendrum calimanianum V.P.Castro
- Epidendrum callobotrys Kraenzl.
- Epidendrum caloglossum Schltr.
- Epidendrum calothyrsus Schltr.
- Epidendrum caluerorum Hágsater
- Epidendrum calyptrandrium Hágsater, Medina Tr. & Huamantupa
- Epidendrum calyptratoides Hágsater & Dodson
- Epidendrum calyptratum F.Lehm. & Kraenzl.
- Epidendrum calyptrectylosum Hágsater & E.Santiago
- Epidendrum camargoi (Szlach. & Kolan.) J.M.H.Shaw
- Epidendrum camilae Collantes & Hágsater
- Epidendrum camilo-diazii Hágsater & Chocce
- Epidendrum campbellstigma Hágsater & García-Cruz
- Epidendrum campellii Archila
- Epidendrum campestre Lindl.
- Epidendrum campii Hágsater & Dodson
- Epidendrum campos-portoi Barberena
- Epidendrum camposii Hágsater
- Epidendrum campyloglossum P.Ortiz & Hágsater
- Epidendrum campylonocturnum Hágsater & Uribe Vélez
- Epidendrum campylorhachis Hágsater & Dodson
- Epidendrum campylostele Hágsater & R.Vásquez
- Epidendrum cancanae (P.Ortiz) Hágsater
- Epidendrum candelabrum Hágsater
- Epidendrum caparaoense W.Forst. & V.C.Souza
- Epidendrum capitalinum Karremans
- Epidendrum capitellatum C.Schweinf.
- Epidendrum capricornu Kraenzl.
- Epidendrum caquetanum Schltr.
- Epidendrum caranquii Hágsater & Salas Guerr.
- Epidendrum carautaense Hágsater & L.Sánchez
- Epidendrum carchiense Hágsater & Dodson
- Epidendrum cardenasii Hágsater
- Epidendrum cardiobatesii Hágsater & Dodson
- Epidendrum cardiochilum L.O.Williams
- Epidendrum cardiodontatum Hágsater & Dodson
- Epidendrum cardioepichilum Hágsater, D.Trujillo & E.Santiago
- Epidendrum cardioglossum Rchb.f.
- Epidendrum cardiomorphum Hágsater & E.Santiago
- Epidendrum cardiophorum Schltr.
- Epidendrum cardiophyllum Kraenzl.
- Epidendrum cardiostachyum Hágsater & E.Santiago
- Epidendrum carlos-uribei Hágsater & E.Santiago
- Epidendrum carmelense Hágsater & Dodson
- Epidendrum carnevalii Hágsater & L.Sánchez
- Epidendrum carnosiflorum C.Schweinf.
- Epidendrum caroli Schltr.
- Epidendrum carpishense Hágsater, D.Trujillo & E.Santiago
- Epidendrum carpophorum Barb.Rodr.
- Epidendrum cartilaginiflorum Rchb.f.
- Epidendrum carvalhoi Toscano
- Epidendrum catillus Rchb.f. & Warsz.
- Epidendrum cauliflorum Lindl.
- Epidendrum caurense Carnevali & G.A.Romero
- Epidendrum caveroi D.E.Benn. & Christenson
- Epidendrum cearense Barb.Rodr.
- Epidendrum celicense Hágsater & Dodson
- Epidendrum celsiae J.S.Moreno & Hágsater
- Epidendrum centronum Hágsater & Dodson
- Epidendrum centropetalum Rchb.f.
- Epidendrum cereiflorum Garay & Dunst.
- Epidendrum cerinum Schltr.
- Epidendrum cernuum Kunth
- Epidendrum cesar-fernandezii Carnevali & I.Ramírez
- Epidendrum ceticaudatum Rinc.-González, Villanueva & E.Santiago
- Epidendrum chachapoyarum Chocce, Hágsater, M.E.Acuña & Vega-Vera
- Epidendrum chalcochromum Hágsater
- Epidendrum chalmersii Hágsater & Ric.Fernández
- Epidendrum chanchamayodifforme Hágsater & L.Sánchez
- Epidendrum chaoticum Hágsater & E.Santiago
- Epidendrum chaparense Dodson & R.Vásquez
- Epidendrum chaquirense Hágsater & L.Sánchez
- Epidendrum charpinii Hágsater & E.Santiago
- Epidendrum chartacifolium Hágsater & Sánchez Sald.
- Epidendrum chauvetii Hágsater & L.Sánchez
- Epidendrum chespiritorum Karremans
- Epidendrum chiguindense Hágsater & Dodson
- Epidendrum chilcalorum Hágsater, Reina-Rodr. & Rodr.-Mart.
- Epidendrum chimantense Hágsater & Carnevali
- Epidendrum chinchaoense Hágsater, D.Trujillo & E.Santiago
- Epidendrum chingazaense Hágsater, E.Santiago & Uribe Vélez
- Epidendrum chioneoides Carnevali & G.A.Romero
- Epidendrum chioneum Lindl.
- Epidendrum chiquiribambense Hágsater & Dodson
- Epidendrum chirripoense Hágsater
- Epidendrum chisquillense Hágsater, Edquén & Cisneros
- Epidendrum chloe Rchb.f.
- Epidendrum chloidophyllum Rchb.f. ex Hágsater & Dodson
- Epidendrum chlorinum Barb.Rodr.
- Epidendrum chlorocorymbos Schltr.
- Epidendrum chloronanum Hágsater & Cisneros
- Epidendrum chlorops Rchb.f.
- Epidendrum choccei M.E.Acuña, Hágsater & E.Santiago
- Epidendrum chogoncolonchense Hágsater & Dodson
- Epidendrum chondrochilum F.Lehm. & Kraenzl.
- Epidendrum chotaense Chocce, Hágsater & Vega-Vera
- Epidendrum chrisii-sharoniae L.Valenz. & E.Santiago
- Epidendrum christensonii Hágsater & E.Santiago
- Epidendrum chrysanthum Hágsater & Dodson
- Epidendrum chrysomyristicum Hágsater & E.Santiago
- Epidendrum chugurense Hágsater, E.Santiago, L.Dávila & Chilón
- Epidendrum churubambense Ocupa, J.Duarte, E.Santiago & Hágsater
- Epidendrum churunense Garay & Dunst.
- Epidendrum chuspipatense Hágsater & R.Vásquez
- Epidendrum ciliare L.
- Epidendrum ciliipetalum (Garay) Hágsater & E.Santiago
- Epidendrum cilioccidentale Hágsater & L.Sánchez
- Epidendrum cinnabarinum Salzm. ex Lindl.
- Epidendrum circinatum Ames
- Epidendrum cirrhochiloides Hágsater & E.Santiago
- Epidendrum cirrhochilum F.Lehm. & Kraenzl.
- Epidendrum cirrhohirtzii Hágsater & E.Santiago
- Epidendrum citrinanthum Hágsater
- Epidendrum citrochlorinum Hágsater & Dodson
- Epidendrum citroserpens Hágsater, Cisneros & J.Duarte
- Epidendrum citrosmum Hágsater
- Epidendrum clarkii Hágsater & E.Santiago
- Epidendrum claustralis Hágsater & W.C.Navarro
- Epidendrum clavadista Hágsater & Collantes
- Epidendrum claviculatum W.Wright
- Epidendrum cleefii Hágsater & E.Santiago
- Epidendrum cleistocoleum Hágsater & E.Santiago
- Epidendrum cleistogastrium Hágsater & Dodson
- Epidendrum clowesii Bateman ex Lindl.
- Epidendrum cnemidophorum Lindl.
- Epidendrum cobigoi Sambin & Chiron
- Epidendrum cochabambanum Dodson & R.Vásquez
- Epidendrum cochlidium Lindl.
- Epidendrum cocoense Hágsater
- Epidendrum coconucoense Hágsater, E.Santiago & Uribe Vélez
- Epidendrum cocornocturnum Hágsater
- Epidendrum cocuyense Hágsater & E.Santiago
- Epidendrum cogniauxianum Hoehne
- Epidendrum coilotrienum Hágsater & L.Sánchez
- Epidendrum colanense Hágsater & E.Santiago
- Epidendrum colibri Karremans
- Epidendrum colliculosum Hágsater & E.Santiago
- Epidendrum colombianum A.D.Hawkes
- Epidendrum commelinispathum Carnevali & I.Ramírez
- Epidendrum commelinoides Schltr.
- Epidendrum compressibulbum D.E.Benn. & Christenson
- Epidendrum compressum Griseb.
- Epidendrum concavilabium C.Schweinf.
- Epidendrum concavitridentes Hágsater, Edquén & E.Santiago
- Epidendrum condorense Hágsater & Dodson
- Epidendrum condornocturnum Hágsater & Tobar
- Epidendrum confertum Ames & C.Schweinf.
- Epidendrum congestum Rolfe
- Epidendrum connatum Hágsater & E.Santiago
- Epidendrum conopseum R.Br.
- Epidendrum conservatorum Karremans
- Epidendrum constricolumna Hágsater, Chocce & E.Santiago
- Epidendrum constrictum Hágsater & E.Santiago
- Epidendrum convergens Garay & Dunst.
- Epidendrum cooperianum Bateman
- Epidendrum coordinatum Rchb.f.
- Epidendrum corallinum Hágsater
- Epidendrum cordatum Ruiz & Pav.
- Epidendrum cordiforme C.Schweinf.
- Epidendrum coriifolium Lindl.
- Epidendrum cornanthera F.Lehm. & Kraenzl.
- Epidendrum cornicallosum Foldats
- Epidendrum cornurepens Hágsater, H.Ferrer & L.Sánchez
- Epidendrum cornutum Lindl.
- Epidendrum coronatum Ruiz & Pav.
- Epidendrum coroshaense Hágsater, Edquén & E.Santiago
- Epidendrum corymborkiphyllum Hágsater & E.Santiago
- Epidendrum corymbosum Ruiz & Pav.
- Epidendrum coryophorum (Kunth) Rchb.f.
- Epidendrum costanense Hágsater & Carnevali
- Epidendrum costatum A.Rich. & Galeotti
- Epidendrum cotacachiense Hágsater & Dodson
- Epidendrum cottoniiflorum (Rchb.f.) Hágsater
- Epidendrum coxianum Rchb.f.
- Epidendrum crassinervium Kraenzl.
- Epidendrum crassum C.Schweinf.
- Epidendrum cremersii Hágsater & L.Sánchez
- Epidendrum crenulidifforme L.Sánchez & Hágsater
- Epidendrum crescentilobum Ames
- Epidendrum criniferum Rchb.f.
- Epidendrum cristatum Ruiz & Pav.
- Epidendrum croatii Hágsater
- Epidendrum croceoserpens Hágsater & Salas Guerr.
- Epidendrum croceum Ruiz & Pav.
- Epidendrum cruciforme Hágsater & E.Santiago
- Epidendrum cryptanthum L.O.Williams
- Epidendrum cryptopateras Hágsater & Courtinard
- Epidendrum cryptorhachis Hágsater
- Epidendrum cryptotropis Hágsater, Collantes & E.Santiago
- Epidendrum cuatrecasasii Garay
- Epidendrum cuchibambae F.Lehm. & Kraenzl.
- Epidendrum cuencanum Schltr.
- Epidendrum cuicochaense Hágsater & Dodson
- Epidendrum culmiforme Schltr.
- Epidendrum cuneatoides Dodson ex Hágsater
- Epidendrum cuneatum Schltr.
- Epidendrum cuniculatum Schltr.
- Epidendrum cupreum F.Lehm. & Kraenzl.
- Epidendrum curimarcense Hágsater, W.C.Navarro & H.R.Quispe
- Epidendrum curtisii A.D.Hawkes
- Epidendrum curvisepalum Hágsater & Dressler
- Epidendrum cusii Hágsater
- Epidendrum cusiyacoense Kolan. & Szlach.
- Epidendrum cuyujense Hágsater & Dodson
- Epidendrum cyclolobum Hágsater & E.Santiago
- Epidendrum cyclopterum Schltr.
- Epidendrum cyclotylosum Hágsater
- Epidendrum cylindraceum Lindl.
- Epidendrum cylindrostachys Rchb.f. & Warsz.
- Epidendrum cylindrostenophyllum Hágsater & Dodson
- Epidendrum cymbiglossum Hágsater
- Epidendrum cyparisii Hágsater, Charly & Viscardi
- Epidendrum cystosum Ames

== D ==
- Epidendrum dactyloclinium Hágsater & Dodson
- Epidendrum dactylodes Rchb.f. ex Hágsater
- Epidendrum dalessandroi Hágsater & Dodson
- Epidendrum dalstromii Dodson
- Epidendrum dariense Hágsater, Kolan. & L.Sánchez
- Epidendrum dasyanthum Hágsater
- Epidendrum davidsei Hágsater
- Epidendrum davilae Hágsater, E.Santiago & R.M.Cavero
- Epidendrum dayseae Krahl & Hágsater
- Epidendrum decurviflorum Schltr.
- Epidendrum deditae Hágsater & Krahl
- Epidendrum degranvillei Hágsater & L.Sánchez
- Epidendrum dejeaniae Chiron, Hágsater & L.Sánchez
- Epidendrum delcastilloi D.E.Benn. & Christenson
- Epidendrum delsyae Hágsater & Cisneros
- Epidendrum deltastachyum Hágsater & E.Santiago
- Epidendrum deltochilum Hágsater & E.Santiago
- Epidendrum deltogastropodium Hágsater & E.Santiago
- Epidendrum deltoglossum Garay & Dunst.
- Epidendrum deltoideoviridis Hágsater
- Epidendrum dendrobii Rchb.f.
- Epidendrum dendrobioides Thunb.
- Epidendrum dendromacroophorum Hágsater, E.Santiago & O.Pérez
- Epidendrum densiflorum Hook.
- Epidendrum densifolium Kraenzl.
- Epidendrum denticulatum Barb.Rodr.
- Epidendrum dentiferum Ames & C.Schweinf.
- Epidendrum dentilobum Ames, F.T.Hubb. & C.Schweinf.
- Epidendrum deorsus Hágsater & E.Santiago
- Epidendrum dermatanthum Kraenzl.
- Epidendrum dialychilum Hágsater & Dodson
- Epidendrum dialyrhombicum Hágsater & Dodson
- Epidendrum diamantinense K.G.Lacerda & V.P.Castro
- Epidendrum dianae Sambin & Chiron
- Epidendrum dichaeoides Carnevali & G.A.Romero
- Epidendrum dichotomum C.Presl
- Epidendrum difforme Jacq.
- Epidendrum diffusum Sw.
- Epidendrum dilochioides L.O.Williams
- Epidendrum diommoides Hágsater, Edquén & E.Santiago
- Epidendrum diommum Hágsater & Chocce
- Epidendrum diosanense Hágsater, Edquén & E.Santiago
- Epidendrum diothonaeoides Schltr.
- Epidendrum diphyllum Schltr.
- Epidendrum dipus Lindl.
- Epidendrum discoidale Lindl.
- Epidendrum dixiorum Hágsater
- Epidendrum dodii L.Sánchez & Hágsater
- Epidendrum dodsonii Hágsater & E.Santiago
- Epidendrum dolichobotryoides Hágsater, E.Santiago & Chocce
- Epidendrum dolichocaulum Hágsater & A.G.Diaz
- Epidendrum dolichochlamys Hágsater & E.Santiago
- Epidendrum dolichoporpax Hágsater
- Epidendrum dolichorhachis Hágsater & Dodson
- Epidendrum × doroteae P.H.Allen
- Epidendrum dorsocarinatum Hágsater
- Epidendrum dosbocasense Hágsater
- Epidendrum dressleri Hágsater
- Epidendrum dugandianum A.D.Hawkes
- Epidendrum dukei Kolan. & Mystkowska
- Epidendrum dunstervillei A.D.Hawkes
- Epidendrum dunstervilleorum Foldats
- Epidendrum durum Lindl.
- Epidendrum dwyeri Hágsater
- Epidendrum dwyerioides Hágsater & E.Santiago

== E ==
- Epidendrum eburneum Rchb.f.
- Epidendrum echinatum Løjtnant
- Epidendrum eduardo-perezii Hágsater & E.Santiago
- Epidendrum edwardsii Ames
- Epidendrum effusipetalum Hágsater, Edquén & E.Santiago
- Epidendrum elatum C.Schweinf.
- Epidendrum elcimeyae Hágsater & García-Cruz
- Epidendrum elegantissimum F.Lehm. & Kraenzl.
- Epidendrum elephantinum Hágsater
- Epidendrum elephantotis Hágsater & L.Sánchez
- Epidendrum elleanthodiceras Hágsater & E.Santiago
- Epidendrum elleanthoides Schltr.
- Epidendrum ellemanniae Hágsater & Dodson
- Epidendrum ellipsophyllum L.O.Williams
- Epidendrum ellipticum Graham
- Epidendrum ellisii Rolfe
- Epidendrum × elongatum Jacq.
- Epidendrum enantilobum Hágsater
- Epidendrum endresii Rchb.f.
- Epidendrum englerianum F.Lehm. & Kraenzl.
- Epidendrum englerioides Hágsater, Uribe Vélez & Cisneros
- Epidendrum envigadoense Hágsater
- Epidendrum epidendroides (Garay) Mora-Ret. & García Castro
- Epidendrum erectifolium Hágsater & L.Sánchez
- Epidendrum erectum Brieger & Bicalho
- Epidendrum erica-moroniae Hágsater & E.Santiago
- Epidendrum erikae Hágsater & E.Santiago
- Epidendrum eriksenii Hágsater & Dodson
- Epidendrum erosum Ames & C.Schweinf.
- Epidendrum erythrostigma Hágsater
- Epidendrum escobarianum Garay
- Epidendrum esmeraldense Hágsater, H.Medina & E.Santiago
- Epidendrum esperanza-mejiae Hágsater & Uribe Vélez
- Epidendrum espiritu-santense Dodson & R.Vásquez
- Epidendrum estrellense Ames
- Epidendrum euchroma Schltr.
- Epidendrum eugenii Schltr.
- Epidendrum eustirum Ames, F.T.Hubb. & C.Schweinf.
- Epidendrum evelynae Rchb.f.
- Epidendrum exaltatum Kraenzl.
- Epidendrum examinis S.Rosillo
- Epidendrum exasperatum Rchb.f.
- Epidendrum excelsum C.Schweinf.
- Epidendrum excisum Lindl.
- Epidendrum exiguum Ames & C.Schweinf.
- Epidendrum exile Ames
- Epidendrum eximium L.O.Williams

== F ==
- Epidendrum fagerlindii Hágsater & Dodson
- Epidendrum falcatum Lindl.
- Epidendrum falcisepalum F.Lehm. & Kraenzl.
- Epidendrum falcivesicicaule Hágsater & E.Santiago
- Epidendrum falsigarayi Hágsater & Karremans
- Epidendrum falsiloquum Rchb.f.
- Epidendrum falsiquisayanum Hágsater & E.Santiago
- Epidendrum falsum Rchb.f.
- Epidendrum farallocernuum Hágsater & E.Santiago
- Epidendrum farallonense Hágsater
- Epidendrum farfanii Hágsater, E.Santiago & Uribe Vélez
- Epidendrum fastigiatum Lindl.
- Epidendrum ferreyrae Hágsater & Ric.Fernández
- Epidendrum ferrugineum Ruiz & Pav.
- Epidendrum festucoides Kraenzl.
- Epidendrum filamentosum Kraenzl.
- Epidendrum filicaule Lindl.
- Epidendrum filipetalum Hágsater, E.Santiago & J.M.Vélez
- Epidendrum fimbriatum Kunth
- Epidendrum findlingiae Hágsater, Dalström & Ruíz Pérez
- Epidendrum firmum Rchb.f.
- Epidendrum flabellilobatum Hágsater & Medina Tr.
- Epidendrum flammeum E.M.Pessoa & M.Alves
- Epidendrum flexicaule Schltr.
- Epidendrum flexuoecallosum Hágsater & E.Santiago
- Epidendrum flexuosissimum C.Schweinf.
- Epidendrum flexuosum G.Mey.
- Epidendrum floridense Hágsater
- Epidendrum foldatsii Hágsater & Carnevali
- Epidendrum folsomii Hágsater & E.Santiago
- Epidendrum forcipatoides Hágsater
- Epidendrum forcipatum C.Schweinf.
- Epidendrum fortunae Hágsater & Dressler
- Epidendrum fosbergii Hágsater & Dodson
- Epidendrum × foulquieri Chiron
- Epidendrum francisci Chocce, Hágsater & M.E.Acuña
- Epidendrum franckei Hágsater
- Epidendrum fraternum Schltr.
- Epidendrum frechetteanum D.E.Benn. & Christenson
- Epidendrum freireanum Hágsater & E.Santiago
- Epidendrum friderici-guilielmi Warsz. ex Lindl.
- Epidendrum frigidum Linden ex Lindl.
- Epidendrum fritzianum Hoehne
- Epidendrum fritzicardium Hágsater & E.Santiago
- Epidendrum fritzidalessandroi Hágsater & E.Santiago
- Epidendrum fritzimegalotylosum Hágsater & E.Santiago
- Epidendrum frons-bovis Kraenzl.
- Epidendrum frutex Rchb.f.
- Epidendrum fruticetorum Schltr.
- Epidendrum fruticosum Pav. ex Lindl.
- Epidendrum fruticulus Schltr.
- Epidendrum fujimorianum D.E.Benn. & Christenson
- Epidendrum fulfordianum Pupulin & Karremans
- Epidendrum fulgens Brongn.
- Epidendrum fusagasugaense E.Parra, Hágsater & L.Sánchez
- Epidendrum fuscinum (Dressler) Hágsater
- Epidendrum fusiforme (Lindl.) Rchb.f.

== G ==
- Epidendrum gabanense Hágsater & E.Santiago
- Epidendrum gaertelmaniae Hágsater & O.Pérez
- Epidendrum galeochilum Hágsater & Dressler
- Epidendrum galeottianum A.Rich. & Galeotti
- Epidendrum galianoi Hágsater, E.Santiago, J.Duarte & L.Valenz.
- Epidendrum garayi Løjtnant
- Epidendrum garcia-esquivelii Hágsater & L.Sánchez
- Epidendrum garciae Pabst
- Epidendrum gasteriferum Scheeren
- Epidendrum gastrochilum Kraenzl.
- Epidendrum gastropodium Rchb.f.
- Epidendrum gelisii Hágsater
- Epidendrum geminatum Schltr.
- Epidendrum geminiflorum Kunth
- Epidendrum geminiochraceum Hágsater, E.Santiago & Medina Tr.
- Epidendrum geminisuborbiculatum Hágsater, E.Santiago & Medina Tr.
- Epidendrum geniculatum Barb.Rodr.
- Epidendrum gentryi Dodson
- Epidendrum gerlachianum Hágsater, O.Pérez & E.Santiago
- Epidendrum gibbosum L.O.Williams
- Epidendrum giraldo-canasii Hágsater, O.Pérez & E.Santiago
- Epidendrum glabrilabium (Szlach. & Kolan.) J.M.H.Shaw
- Epidendrum globiflorum F.Lehm. & Kraenzl.
- Epidendrum globuliferum Karremans
- Epidendrum gloria-imperatrix Hágsater & G.Calat.
- Epidendrum glossaspis Rchb.f.
- Epidendrum glossoceras Rchb.f. & Warsz.
- Epidendrum glossoclinium Hágsater & Dodson
- Epidendrum glumarum Hamer & Garay
- Epidendrum gnomoides Hágsater
- Epidendrum gnomus Schltr.
- Epidendrum goebelii Schltr.
- Epidendrum golondrinense Hágsater & Dodson
- Epidendrum gomezii Schltr.
- Epidendrum gongorarum Hágsater, Pfahl & Cisneros
- Epidendrum goniorhachis Schltr.
- Epidendrum gracilibracteatum Hágsater & Dodson
- Epidendrum gracillimum Rchb.f. & Warsz.
- Epidendrum grammipetalostachyum Hágsater & E.Santiago
- Epidendrum grand-ansense Nir
- Epidendrum × gransabanense Carnevali & I.Ramírez
- Epidendrum gratiosum Rchb.f.
- Epidendrum gratissimum (Rchb.f.) Hágsater & Dodson
- Epidendrum grayi Hágsater & Dodson
- Epidendrum grayumii Hágsater & E.Santiago
- Epidendrum greenwoodii Hágsater
- Epidendrum gregorii Hágsater
- Epidendrum grenadense Hágsater & E.Santiago
- Epidendrum guacamayense Hágsater & Dodson
- Epidendrum guagra-urcuense Hágsater & Dodson
- Epidendrum gualaquicense Hágsater & Dodson
- Epidendrum guanacasense Hágsater & Dodson
- Epidendrum guanacastense Ames & C.Schweinf.
- Epidendrum guaramacalense Hágsater
- Epidendrum guaridense Hágsater & E.Santiago
- Epidendrum guerrerense Hágsater & García-Cruz
- Epidendrum guiardianum Sambin, Essers & Chiron
- Epidendrum guillermoi P.Ortiz
- Epidendrum guislainae Hágsater & C.Soto
- Epidendrum gygorum Hágsater, E.Santiago & Cisneros
- Epidendrum gymnochlamys Hágsater & E.Santiago

== H ==
- Epidendrum haberi Hágsater & L.Sánchez
- Epidendrum haematanthum Schltr.
- Epidendrum haenkeanum C.Presl
- Epidendrum hagsateri Christenson
- Epidendrum hajekii R.Vásquez & Dodson
- Epidendrum hamatum (Garay) Dressler
- Epidendrum hameri Hágsater & L.Sánchez
- Epidendrum hammelii Hágsater & L.Sánchez
- Epidendrum hardingiae J.S.Moreno, Hágsater & L.Sánchez
- Epidendrum harlingii Hágsater & Dodson
- Epidendrum harmsianum Kraenzl.
- Epidendrum harrisoniae Hook.
- Epidendrum hartmanii Hágsater & L.Sánchez
- Epidendrum hartmanniorum Karremans & M.Díaz
- Epidendrum hassleri Cogn.
- Epidendrum hawkesii A.H.Heller
- Epidendrum heliconaense Hágsater & E.Santiago
- Epidendrum hellerianum A.D.Hawkes
- Epidendrum hemihenomenum Hágsater & Dodson
- Epidendrum hemiscleria Rchb.f.
- Epidendrum hemisclerioides (Kraenzl.) Hágsater & Dodson
- Epidendrum henschenii Barb.Rodr.
- Epidendrum heringeri Hágsater
- Epidendrum hernandoi (Szlach. & Kolan.) J.M.H.Shaw
- Epidendrum herrenhusanum Hágsater
- Epidendrum hesperium Hágsater & E.Santiago
- Epidendrum heterobracteatum Hágsater & H.Medina
- Epidendrum heterodoxum Rchb.f.
- Epidendrum heterothoneum (Rchb.f. & Warsz.) Hágsater & Dodson
- Epidendrum hexagonum Hágsater & Dodson
- Epidendrum hirtzipaniculatum Hágsater & E.Santiago
- Epidendrum hitchcockii Hágsater & Dodson
- Epidendrum holochilum (Schltr.) Mansf. ex Hágsater
- Epidendrum hololeucum Barb.Rodr.
- Epidendrum holstii Hágsater & Carnevali
- Epidendrum holtonii Hágsater & L.Sánchez
- Epidendrum hombersleyi Summerh.
- Epidendrum homeieri Hágsater & E.Santiago
- Epidendrum homoion Hágsater & Dodson
- Epidendrum hondurense Ames
- Epidendrum hookerianum Rchb.f.
- Epidendrum hopfianum Schltr.
- Epidendrum horichii Hágsater
- Epidendrum hornitense Hágsater & L.Sánchez
- Epidendrum huamantuparum Hágsater & E.Santiago
- Epidendrum huaytianum Hágsater
- Epidendrum hueycantenangense Hágsater & García-Cruz
- Epidendrum hugomedinae Hágsater & Dodson
- Epidendrum humeadorense Hágsater & Dodson
- Epidendrum humidicola Schltr.
- Epidendrum hunterianum Schltr.
- Epidendrum hurtadoi Hágsater, Uribe Vélez & De Arcos
- Epidendrum hutchisonii Hágsater
- Epidendrum hyalinilabrum Hágsater, Reina-Rodr. & Cisneros
- Epidendrum hygrohylephilum Hágsater & E.Santiago
- Epidendrum hymenodes Lindl.
- Epidendrum hypoporphyreum Hágsater, E.Santiago & E.Parra

== I ==
- Epidendrum iang-rondonii M.Bonilla, Hágsater & L.Sánchez
- Epidendrum ibaguense Kunth
- Epidendrum ibarrae R.González
- Epidendrum idroboi Hágsater
- Epidendrum igneosicola G.A.Romero, Carnevali & Hágsater
- Epidendrum igneum Hágsater
- Epidendrum iguagoi Hágsater & Dodson
- Epidendrum ilense Dodson
- Epidendrum ilinizae Hágsater & Dodson
- Epidendrum ilinizaincomptum Hágsater
- Epidendrum iltisorum Dodson
- Epidendrum imitans Schltr.
- Epidendrum imperator Hágsater
- Epidendrum imthurnii Ridl.
- Epidendrum inamoenum Kraenzl.
- Epidendrum × inauditum Zambrano & Hágsater
- Epidendrum incahuamanii Collantes & Hágsater
- Epidendrum incapachychilum Hágsater & E.Santiago
- Epidendrum incognitum Hágsater, E.Santiago & J.Duarte
- Epidendrum incomptoides Ames, F.T.Hubb. & C.Schweinf.
- Epidendrum incomptum Rchb.f.
- Epidendrum indanzense Hágsater & Dodson
- Epidendrum indecoratum Schltr.
- Epidendrum infaustum Rchb.f.
- Epidendrum infundibulum Hágsater & E.Santiago
- Epidendrum ingrabrachyphyllum Hágsater & E.Santiago
- Epidendrum ingramii Hágsater & García-Cruz
- Epidendrum inhibitiosum Karremans & Mel.Fernández
- Epidendrum inornatum Schltr.
- Epidendrum insectiferum Lindl.
- Epidendrum insignificans Hágsater & Dodson
- Epidendrum insolatum Barringer
- Epidendrum insulanum Schltr.
- Epidendrum integrinanum Hágsater
- Epidendrum intermixtum Ames & C.Schweinf.
- Epidendrum intertextum F.Lehm. & Kraenzl.
- Epidendrum involutum Hágsater & E.Santiago
- Epidendrum ionophyllum P.Ortiz
- Epidendrum ionostachyum Hágsater, E.Santiago & García-Revelo
- Epidendrum iridicolor Karremans
- Epidendrum isaucapitellatum Hágsater & E.Santiago
- Epidendrum isis Hágsater & Dodson
- Epidendrum isomerum Schltr.
- Epidendrum isthmi Schltr.
- Epidendrum isthmoides Hágsater & E.Santiago
- Epidendrum itacolomiense E.M.Pessoa & L.G.Pedrosa
- Epidendrum ivan-portillae Hágsater & H.Medina
- Epidendrum ixilum Hágsater, Archila & Chiron

== J ==
- Epidendrum jacarandichromum Hágsater, E.Santiago & Uribe Vélez
- Epidendrum jajense Rchb.f.
- Epidendrum jalcaense Chocce, Dalström, Hágsater & J.Arnaiz
- Epidendrum jamaicense Lindl.
- Epidendrum jamiesonis Rchb.f.
- "Epidendrum juaicaense Hágsater, L.Pina & J.Duarte
- Epidendrum jarae D.E.Benn. & Christenson
- Epidendrum jaramilloae Hágsater & Dodson
- Epidendrum jasminosmum Hágsater & Dodson
- Epidendrum jativae Dodson
- Epidendrum jatunsachanum Dodson & Hágsater
- Epidendrum jefeallenii Hágsater & García-Cruz
- Epidendrum jefestigma Hágsater & García-Cruz
- Epidendrum jejunum Rchb.f.
- Epidendrum jessupiorum Hágsater & Dodson
- Epidendrum jimburense Hágsater & Dodson
- Epidendrum jimenezii Hágsater
- Epidendrum joaquin-ortizii Hágsater, E.Santiago & Salas Guerr.
- Epidendrum johnstonii Ames
- Epidendrum jorge-warneri Karremans & Hágsater
- Epidendrum jose-alvarezii Hágsater, Gut.Peralta & Nauray
- Epidendrum josianae M.Frey & V.P.Castro
- Epidendrum juergensenii Rchb.f.

== K ==
- Epidendrum kabirii Hágsater & E.Santiago
- Epidendrum kalloneuron Kraenzl.
- Epidendrum kanehirae Hágsater
- Epidendrum kapuleri (Szlach. & Kolan.) J.M.H.Shaw
- Epidendrum karstenii Rchb.f.
- Epidendrum katarun-yariku Hágsater & Wrazidlo
- Epidendrum kautskyi Pabst
- Epidendrum kerichilum Hágsater
- Epidendrum kerryae Hágsater & L.Sánchez
- Epidendrum killipii Hágsater & L.Sánchez
- Epidendrum kirkbridei Hágsater & E.Santiago
- Epidendrum klotzscheanum Rchb.f.
- Epidendrum klugii Hágsater & L.Sánchez
- Epidendrum kockii Hágsater & Dodson
- Epidendrum kolanowskae Hágsater, O.Pérez & E.Santiago
- Epidendrum kosnipataense Hágsater, E.Santiago & J.Duarte
- Epidendrum krukoffii Hágsater, J.M.P.Cordeiro & Krahl
- Epidendrum kuelapense (Szlach. & Mytnik) J.M.H.Shaw
- Epidendrum kusibabii Szlach., Kulak, Rutk. & Marg.
- Epidendrum kymatochilum Hágsater & Dodson

== L ==
- Epidendrum labrychilum Hágsater, Edquén & E.Santiago
- Epidendrum laceratum C.Schweinf.
- Epidendrum lacertinum Lindl.
- Epidendrum laciniatum Zambrano & Hágsater
- Epidendrum laciniitropis Hágsater
- Epidendrum lacteum Dressler
- Epidendrum lacustre Lindl.
- Epidendrum laeve Lindl.
- Epidendrum lagenocolumna Hágsater & L.Sánchez
- Epidendrum lagenomorphum Hágsater & Dodson
- Epidendrum lagotis Rchb.f.
- Epidendrum lambeauanum De Wild.
- Epidendrum lamprochilum Hágsater
- Epidendrum lanceolatum Bradford ex Griseb.
- Epidendrum lancilabium Schltr.
- Epidendrum lanioides Schltr.
- Epidendrum lanipes Lindl.
- Epidendrum lankesteri Ames
- Epidendrum larae Dodson & R.Vásquez
- Epidendrum lasiostachyum Rodr.-Mart., Hágsater & E.Santiago
- Epidendrum laterale Rolfe
- Epidendrum laterinocturnum Hágsater
- Epidendrum lateritium Hágsater & Jenny
- Epidendrum latibracteum Kraenzl.
- Epidendrum latilabre Lindl.
- Epidendrum latisegmentum C.Schweinf.
- Epidendrum latorreorum Chocce, Hágsater & Dalström
- Epidendrum laucheanum Bonhof ex Rolfe
- Epidendrum laurelense Hágsater & Dodson
- Epidendrum lavendulum Hágsater
- Epidendrum lawessonii Hágsater & Dodson
- Epidendrum laxicaule D.E.Benn. & Christenson
- Epidendrum laxifoliatum Schltr.
- Epidendrum lechleri Rchb.f.
- Epidendrum leeanum (Rchb.f.) Hágsater
- Epidendrum lehmannii Rchb.f.
- Epidendrum leimebambense Hágsater
- Epidendrum leiomesomicron Hágsater & E.Santiago
- Epidendrum lembotylosum Hágsater & Dodson
- Epidendrum leonii D.E.Benn. & Christenson
- Epidendrum leonorae Hágsater, O.Pérez & E.Santiago
- Epidendrum leopardihamatum Hágsater & Est.Domínguez
- Epidendrum leptanthum Hágsater
- Epidendrum leptopetalum Zambrano & Hágsater
- Epidendrum leptophytum Hágsater
- Epidendrum lesteri Hágsater & Dodson
- Epidendrum leucochilum Link, Klotzsch & Otto
- Epidendrum leucolasium Hágsater & E.Santiago
- Epidendrum leucolistron Hágsater, F.Werner & E.Santiago
- Epidendrum leuconanum Hágsater & L.Valenz.
- Epidendrum leucosmoalpicola Hágsater & García-Llatas
- Epidendrum lezlieae R.Vásquez & Ibisch
- Epidendrum libiae Hágsater, García Lopera & Est.Domínguez
- Epidendrum lignosum Lex.
- Epidendrum liguliferum C.Schweinf.
- Epidendrum lilacinoides Hágsater & E.Santiago
- Epidendrum lilijae Foldats
- Epidendrum lima Lindl.
- Epidendrum lindae Hágsater & Dodson
- Epidendrum lindamazonicum Hágsater & G.Calat.
- Epidendrum lindbergii Rchb.f.
- Epidendrum linderi Hágsater & E.Santiago
- Epidendrum linearidiforme Hágsater & L.Sánchez
- Epidendrum lirion Hágsater & Dodson
- Epidendrum litense Hágsater & Dodson
- Epidendrum litteraense Hágsater, E.Santiago & Uribe Vélez
- Epidendrum littorale Hágsater & Dodson
- Epidendrum lizethae Hágsater, Rinc.-Useche & L.Sánchez
- Epidendrum llactapataense D.E.Benn. & Christenson
- Epidendrum llatasii Hágsater, A.G.Diaz & E.Santiago
- Epidendrum llaviucoense Hágsater & Dodson
- Epidendrum lloense (Lindl.) Hágsater & Dodson
- Epidendrum lockhartioides Schltr.
- Epidendrum loefgrenii Cogn.
- Epidendrum loejtnantii Hágsater & Dodson
- Epidendrum longibracteatum Hágsater
- Epidendrum longicaule (L.O.Williams) L.O.Williams
- Epidendrum longicolle Lindl.
- Epidendrum longipetalum A.Rich. & Galeotti
- Epidendrum longirepens (C.Schweinf.) C.Schweinf.
- Epidendrum lopezii Hágsater
- Epidendrum lophotropis Hágsater & Dodson
- Epidendrum lowilliamsii García-Cruz
- Epidendrum loxense F.Lehm. & Kraenzl.
- Epidendrum luceroae J.S.Moreno, Hágsater, E.Santiago & García-Revelo
- Epidendrum luckei I.Bock
- Epidendrum lueri Dodson & Hágsater
- Epidendrum lufinorum Ocupa & Hágsater
- Epidendrum luis-sanchezii Hágsater, E.Parra & O.Pérez
- Epidendrum luizae Krahl, Hágsater & Chiron
- Epidendrum lumbaquiense Hágsater & Dodson
- Epidendrum lunatus Hágsater, A.G.Diaz & Olórtegui
- Epidendrum luteostenophyton Hágsater, Edquén & E.Santiago
- Epidendrum lutescens Hágsater, E.Santiago & J.Duarte
- Epidendrum luteynii Hágsater & E.Santiago
- Epidendrum lutheri Hágsater

== M ==
- Epidendrum macarense Hágsater & L.Sánchez
- Epidendrum macasense Hágsater & Dodson
- Epidendrum macbridei C.Schweinf.
- Epidendrum macdougallii (Hágsater) Hágsater
- Epidendrum machinense M.F.Escal. & Rinc.-González
- Epidendrum macphersonii Hágsater & E.Santiago
- Epidendrum macrocarpum Rich.
- Epidendrum macroceras Schltr.
- Epidendrum macroclinium Hágsater
- Epidendrum macrocyphum Kraenzl.
- Epidendrum macrogastrium Kraenzl.
- Epidendrum macroilinizae Hágsater, Cisneros & J.Duarte
- Epidendrum macroophorum Hágsater & Dodson
- Epidendrum macrophysum Hágsater, O.Pérez & E.Santiago
- Epidendrum macropodum Rchb.f.
- Epidendrum macrum Dressler
- Epidendrum macuchiense Hágsater & E.Santiago
- Epidendrum maderoi Schltr.
- Epidendrum madsenii Hágsater & Dodson
- Epidendrum maduroi Hágsater & García-Cruz
- Epidendrum magalhaesii Schltr.
- Epidendrum magdalenense Porto & Brade
- Epidendrum magnibracteatum Ames
- Epidendrum magnibracteum Kraenzl.
- Epidendrum magnicallosum C.Schweinf.
- Epidendrum magnificum Schltr.
- Epidendrum magnisaxicola Hágsater, Edquén & E.Santiago
- Epidendrum mainauanum Hágsater & H.Medina
- Epidendrum maldonadoense Hágsater & Dodson
- Epidendrum malmoense Hágsater, C.L.Castro & Betancur
- Epidendrum mamapachae Hágsater, F.O.Espinosa & E.Santiago
- Epidendrum manarae Foldats
- Epidendrum mancum Lindl.
- Epidendrum maniespinosarum Hágsater & F.O.Espinosa
- Epidendrum manta-birostris Karremans
- Epidendrum mantinianum Rolfe
- Epidendrum mantiqueranum Porto & Brade
- Epidendrum mantis-religiosae Hágsater
- Epidendrum marcapatense Hágsater & Ric.Fernández
- Epidendrum marci-jimeneziorum Hágsater & R.Jiménez
- Epidendrum marciae Hágsater & E.Santiago
- Epidendrum marioi Zambrano & Hágsater
- Epidendrum marmoratum A.Rich. & Galeotti
- Epidendrum maroniense Hágsater & E.Santiago
- Epidendrum marsiorum R.Vásquez & Ibisch
- Epidendrum marsupiale F.Lehm. & Kraenzl.
- Epidendrum martianum Lindl.
- Epidendrum martinezii L.Sánchez & Carnevali
- Epidendrum massif-hottense Hágsater
- Epidendrum mathewsii Rchb.f.
- Epidendrum mathildae Sambin, Essers & Chiron
- Epidendrum matudae L.O.Williams
- Epidendrum mavrodactylon Hágsater, Edquén & E.Santiago
- Epidendrum maxthompsonianum Hágsater & Dalström
- Epidendrum medinae Dodson
- Epidendrum medusae (Rchb.f.) Pfitzer
- Epidendrum medusichilum Hágsater, E.Santiago & Gal.-Tar.
- Epidendrum megagastrium Lindl.
- Epidendrum megalemmum Carnevali & G.A.Romero
- Epidendrum megalobambusiforme Hágsater & Villaf.
- Epidendrum megaloclinium Hágsater & Dodson
- Epidendrum megalocoleum Hágsater
- Epidendrum megalopentadactylum Hágsater & Huayta
- Epidendrum megalophyllostachyum Hágsater, E.Santiago & Rodr.-Mart.
- Epidendrum megalospathum Rchb.f.
- Epidendrum melanogastropodium Hágsater & Dodson
- Epidendrum melanoporphyreum Hágsater
- Epidendrum melanotrichoides Hágsater & Dodson
- Epidendrum melanoxeros Hágsater & Dodson
- Epidendrum melinanthum Schltr.
- Epidendrum melistagoides Hágsater & L.Sánchez
- Epidendrum melistagum Hágsater
- Epidendrum meracryptanthum Hágsater & E.Santiago
- Epidendrum meridense Hágsater & C.J.Jerez
- Epidendrum mesocarpum Hágsater
- Epidendrum mesogastropodium Hágsater & Dodson
- Epidendrum mesomicron Lindl.
- Epidendrum microanoglossum Hágsater & Karremans
- Epidendrum microcapitellatum Hágsater, Medina Tr. & E.Santiago
- Epidendrum microcardium Schltr.
- Epidendrum microcarpum Hágsater & Dodson
- Epidendrum microcattleya (Kraenzl.) Schltr.
- Epidendrum microcattleyioides D.E.Benn. & Christenson
- Epidendrum microcephalum Hágsater & L.Sánchez
- Epidendrum microcharis Rchb.f.
- Epidendrum microdendron Rchb.f.
- Epidendrum microdiothoneum Hágsater & Dodson
- Epidendrum microglossoides Hágsater & Dodson
- Epidendrum microglossum Schltr.
- Epidendrum micromarciae Hágsater & E.Santiago
- Epidendrum micronocturnum Carnevali & G.A.Romero
- Epidendrum microphyllum Lindl.
- Epidendrum microporpax Hágsater
- Epidendrum microrigidiflorum Hágsater
- Epidendrum microsecundum Hágsater & J.Duarte
- Epidendrum microtigriphyllum Ocupa, Hágsater & E.Santiago
- Epidendrum microtum (Lindl.) Hágsater & L.Sánchez
- Epidendrum milenae Dodson & R.Vásquez
- Epidendrum millei Schltr.
- Epidendrum milpoense Hágsater & E.Santiago
- Epidendrum mimeticum Carnevali & G.A.Romero
- Epidendrum mimopsis Hágsater & Dodson
- Epidendrum minarum Hoehne & Schltr.
- Epidendrum miniatum Schltr.
- Epidendrum mininocturnum Dodson
- Epidendrum minutidentatum C.Schweinf.
- Epidendrum minutiflorum C.Schweinf.
- Epidendrum mirabile Ames & C.Schweinf.
- Epidendrum miradoranum Dodson & D.E.Benn.
- Epidendrum miriamiae Karremans
- Epidendrum misasii Hágsater
- Epidendrum miserrimum Rchb.f.
- Epidendrum miserum Lindl.
- Epidendrum mittelstaedtii Hágsater
- Epidendrum mixtoides Hágsater & Dodson
- Epidendrum mixtum Schltr.
- Epidendrum mocinoi Hágsater
- Epidendrum modestissimum F.Lehm. & Kraenzl.
- Epidendrum modestum Rchb.f. & Warsz.
- Epidendrum mojandae Schltr.
- Epidendrum molanoi Rinc.-González, M.F.Escal., E.Santiago & J.S.Moreno
- Epidendrum molaui Hágsater & Dodson
- Epidendrum molinae P.Ortiz & Hágsater
- Epidendrum molle Rchb.f.
- Epidendrum molleturense Hágsater & Dodson
- Epidendrum monophlebium Hágsater
- Epidendrum monteagudoi Hágsater & E.Santiago
- Epidendrum × monteverdense (Pupulin & Hágsater) Hágsater
- Epidendrum montiargentatum Hágsater, E.Santiago & Á.J.Pérez
- Epidendrum montigenum Ridl.
- Epidendrum montis-narae Pupulin & L.Sánchez
- Epidendrum montiscampanario Hágsater, Edquén & E.Santiago
- Epidendrum montischillaense Hágsater, E.Santiago & Zambrano
- Epidendrum montisillinicense Hágsater & Dodson
- Epidendrum montispichinchense Hágsater & Dodson
- Epidendrum montistoletanum Hágsater & E.Santiago
- Epidendrum montserratense Nir
- Epidendrum monzonense Kraenzl.
- Epidendrum mora-retanae Hágsater
- Epidendrum morae P.Ortiz, Hágsater & L.E.Álvarez
- Epidendrum moralesii Hágsater, N.Gut. & E.Santiago
- Epidendrum morganii Dodson & Garay
- Epidendrum morilloi Hágsater & E.Santiago
- Epidendrum morimotoi V.P.Castro & Marçal
- Epidendrum moritzii Rchb.f.
- Epidendrum mormontoyi Collantes & Hágsater
- Epidendrum morochoi Hágsater
- Epidendrum moronense Dodson & Hágsater
- Epidendrum morrisii Hágsater & L.Cerv.
- Epidendrum moscozoi Hágsater & E.Santiago
- Epidendrum motozintlense Hágsater & L.Sánchez
- Epidendrum munchiquense Hágsater, E.Santiago & García-Revelo
- Epidendrum muricatisepalum Hágsater
- Epidendrum muricatoides Hágsater & Dodson
- Epidendrum muscicola Schltr.
- Epidendrum musciferum Lindl.
- Epidendrum mutelianum Cogn.
- Epidendrum mutisii Hágsater
- Epidendrum myodes Rchb.f.
- Epidendrum myrianthum Lindl.
- Epidendrum myrmecophorum Barb.Rodr.
- Epidendrum mytigastropodium Hágsater & E.Santiago

== N ==
- Epidendrum nambijaense Hágsater & H.Medina
- Epidendrum nanegalense Hágsater & Dodson
- Epidendrum nanodentatum Hágsater & Dodson
- Epidendrum nanoecallosum Hágsater & E.Santiago
- Epidendrum nanosimplex Hágsater & Dodson
- Epidendrum nanum C.Schweinf.
- Epidendrum nasturtichilum Hágsater & E.Santiago
- Epidendrum natator Hágsater
- Epidendrum nativitatis Karremans
- Epidendrum naviculare Hágsater, M.E.Acuña & E.Santiago
- Epidendrum neglectum Schltr.
- Epidendrum negropautense Hágsater & H.Medina
- Epidendrum neillii Hágsater & E.Santiago
- Epidendrum nelsonii Hágsater
- Epidendrum nematopetalum Hágsater & Dodson
- Epidendrum neofuchsii J.M.H.Shaw
- Epidendrum neogaliciensis Hágsater & R.González
- Epidendrum neolehmannia Schltr.
- Epidendrum neoporpax Ames
- Epidendrum neoviridiflorum Hágsater
- Epidendrum nervosiflorum Ames & C.Schweinf.
- Epidendrum neudeckeri Dodson & Hágsater
- Epidendrum nevadense Hágsater & E.Santiago
- Epidendrum nicaraguense Scheeren ex Hágsater
- Epidendrum niebliense Hágsater & E.Santiago
- Epidendrum nigricans Schltr.
- Epidendrum nigrivinosum Hágsater, E.Santiago & Á.J.Pérez
- Epidendrum nitens Rchb.f.
- Epidendrum nitidum L.O.Williams
- Epidendrum niveocaligarium Hágsater
- Epidendrum niveum E.M.Pessoa & M.R.Miranda
- Epidendrum × nocteburneum Hágsater & L.Sánchez
- Epidendrum nocteva Hágsater & L.Sánchez
- Epidendrum nocturnum Jacq.
- Epidendrum nora-mesae Hágsater & O.Pérez
- Epidendrum norae Carnevali & G.A.Romero
- Epidendrum notabile Schltr.
- Epidendrum notostachyum Hágsater & E.Santiago
- Epidendrum nubium Rchb.f.
- Epidendrum nudosabanillense Hágsater
- Epidendrum nuriense Carnevali & Hágsater
- Epidendrum nutans Sw.
- Epidendrum nutantirhachis Ames & C.Schweinf.

== O ==
- Epidendrum oaxacanum Rolfe
- Epidendrum obergii A.D.Hawkes
- Epidendrum obliquifolium Ames, F.T.Hubb. & C.Schweinf.
- Epidendrum obliquum Schltr.
- Epidendrum oblongialpicola Hágsater & Dodson
- Epidendrum obovatipetalum Hágsater & Dodson
- Epidendrum occidentale (Christenson) Hágsater & E.Santiago
- Epidendrum ochoae Collantes & Hágsater
- Epidendrum ochricolor A.D.Hawkes
- Epidendrum ocotalense Hágsater & L.Sánchez
- Epidendrum octomerioides Schltr.
- Epidendrum odontantherum Hágsater & Dodson
- Epidendrum odontochilum Hágsater
- Epidendrum odontopetalum Hágsater
- Epidendrum odontospathum Rchb.f.
- Epidendrum odontostachyum Hágsater & E.Santiago
- Epidendrum oellgaardii Hágsater & Dodson
- Epidendrum oenochrochilum Hágsater, Ric.Fernández & E.Santiago
- Epidendrum oenochromum Hágsater & Dodson
- Epidendrum oerstedii Rchb.f.
- Epidendrum oldemanii Christenson
- Epidendrum oliganthum Schltr.
- Epidendrum oligophyllum F.Lehm. & Kraenzl.
- Epidendrum olmedoense Hágsater
- Epidendrum olorteguii Damian, Hágsater & Mitidieri
- Epidendrum ophidion Dodson & R.Vásquez
- Epidendrum ophiochilum Hágsater & Dodson
- Epidendrum opiranthizon Hágsater & Dodson
- Epidendrum oraion Hágsater
- Epidendrum orbicordichilum Hágsater & E.Santiago
- Epidendrum orbiculatum C.Schweinf.
- Epidendrum orchidiflorum Salzm. ex Lindl.
- Epidendrum oreogena Schltr.
- Epidendrum oreonastes Rchb.f.
- Epidendrum orgyale Lindl.
- Epidendrum orientale Hágsater & M.A.Díaz
- Epidendrum oripicoranense Hágsater & E.Santiago
- Epidendrum ornis Hágsater, Edquén, E.Santiago & E.Mondragón
- Epidendrum ornithoglossum Schltr.
- Epidendrum oroense Zambrano, E.Santiago & Hágsater
- Epidendrum orthocaule Schltr.
- Epidendrum orthoclinium Hágsater & Dodson
- Epidendrum orthodontum Hágsater & L.Sánchez
- Epidendrum orthophyllum Hágsater & Dodson
- Epidendrum orthopterum Hágsater & E.Santiago
- Epidendrum ortizii Hágsater & E.Santiago
- Epidendrum oscar-perezii Hágsater, E.Parra & E.Santiago
- Epidendrum otuzcense Hágsater & E.Santiago
- Epidendrum oxapampense Hágsater
- Epidendrum oxybatesii Hágsater & Dodson
- Epidendrum oxycalyx Hágsater & Dodson
- Epidendrum oxyglossum Schltr.
- Epidendrum oxynanodes Hágsater
- Epidendrum oxysepalum Hágsater & E.Santiago

== P ==
- Epidendrum pachacutequianum Hágsater & Collantes
- Epidendrum pachoi Hágsater & L.Sánchez
- Epidendrum pachyceras Hágsater & L.Sánchez
- Epidendrum pachychilum Kraenzl.
- Epidendrum pachyclinium Hágsater & E.Santiago
- Epidendrum pachycoleum Hágsater, O.Pérez & E.Santiago
- Epidendrum pachydiscum Hágsater
- Epidendrum pachyneuron Schltr.
- Epidendrum pachyphylloides Hágsater & E.Santiago
- Epidendrum pachyphyllum Schltr.
- Epidendrum pachyphyton Garay
- Epidendrum pachypodum Schltr.
- Epidendrum pachyrachis Ames
- Epidendrum pachystele Hágsater, Edquén, E.Santiago & Salas Guerr.
- Epidendrum pachytepalum Hágsater & E.Santiago
- Epidendrum pajitense C.Schweinf.
- Epidendrum palaciosii Hágsater & Dodson
- Epidendrum palalabrum Hágsater
- Epidendrum pallatangae Schltr.
- Epidendrum pallens Rchb.f.
- Epidendrum pallidiflorum Hook.
- Epidendrum palmae Kolan., Szlach. & Medina Tr.
- Epidendrum palmidium Hágsater
- Epidendrum pampatamboense Dodson & R.Vásquez
- Epidendrum panamense Schltr.
- Epidendrum panchrysum Rchb.f. & Warsz.
- Epidendrum panduratum Hágsater & Dodson
- Epidendrum panguiense Hágsater & H.Medina
- Epidendrum panicoides Schltr.
- Epidendrum paniculatum Ruiz & Pav.
- Epidendrum paniculolateribilobum Hágsater, Ric.Fernández & E.Santiago
- Epidendrum paniculorotundifolium Hágsater, Kolan. & E.Santiago
- Epidendrum paniculorugulosum Hágsater & E.Santiago
- Epidendrum paniculosum Barb.Rodr.
- Epidendrum paniculourubambense Hágsater & E.Santiago
- Epidendrum paniculovenezolanum Hágsater & E.Santiago
- Epidendrum pansamalae Schltr.
- Epidendrum panteonense Dodson & R.Vásquez
- Epidendrum papallactense Hágsater & Dodson
- Epidendrum papillivesiculatum Hágsater & E.Santiago
- Epidendrum paradisicola Hágsater & García-Cruz
- Epidendrum paraguastigma Hágsater & García-Cruz
- Epidendrum parahybunense Barb.Rodr.
- Epidendrum parallelopetalum Hágsater, A.G.Diaz & E.Santiago
- Epidendrum paranaense Barb.Rodr.
- Epidendrum paranthicum Rchb.f.
- Epidendrum pareciense J.M.P.Cordeiro, L.P.Felix & Hágsater
- Epidendrum parkinsonianum Hook.
- Epidendrum parra-sanchezii Hágsater, O.Pérez & L.Sánchez
- Epidendrum paruimense G.A.Romero & Carnevali
- Epidendrum parviexasperatum (Hágsater) Hágsater
- Epidendrum parviflorum Ruiz & Pav.
- Epidendrum parvilabre Lindl.
- Epidendrum pastoense Schltr.
- Epidendrum pastranae Hágsater
- Epidendrum patens Sw.
- Epidendrum patentifolium Fraga, A.P.Fontana & L.Kollmann
- Epidendrum paucifolium Schltr.
- Epidendrum pazii Hágsater
- Epidendrum pedale Schltr.
- Epidendrum pedicellare Schltr.
- Epidendrum pelletieri Sambin & Chiron
- Epidendrum pendens L.O.Williams
- Epidendrum penneystigma Hágsater & García-Cruz
- Epidendrum pentadactylum Rchb.f.
- Epidendrum pepeportillae Hágsater, H.Medina & Cisneros
- Epidendrum peperomia Rchb.f.
- Epidendrum peperomioides Schltr.
- Epidendrum peraltum Schltr.
- Epidendrum pergameneum Rchb.f.
- Epidendrum pergracile Schltr.
- Epidendrum perijaense Carnevali & G.A.Romero
- Epidendrum peristerium Hágsater & E.Santiago
- Epidendrum pernambucense Cogn.
- Epidendrum peruvianum A.D.Hawkes
- Epidendrum pessoae Hágsater & L.Sánchez
- Epidendrum pfahlii Hágsater & Cisneros
- Epidendrum philippii Rchb.f.
- Epidendrum philocremnum Hágsater & Dodson
- Epidendrum philowercklei Hágsater & E.Santiago
- Epidendrum phlebonocturnum Hágsater & R.Jiménez
- Epidendrum phragmites A.H.Heller & L.O.Williams
- Epidendrum phragmitoides Hágsater
- Epidendrum phtiarichilum Hágsater, E.Santiago & Tobar
- Epidendrum phyllocharis Rchb.f.
- Epidendrum physodes Rchb.f.
- Epidendrum physophorum Schltr.
- Epidendrum physopus Kraenzl.
- Epidendrum pichinchae Schltr.
- Epidendrum piconeblinaense Hágsater
- Epidendrum pilcuense Hágsater
- Epidendrum piliferum Rchb.f.
- Epidendrum × pinheiroi Hágsater
- Epidendrum pinniferum C.Schweinf.
- Epidendrum piperinum Lindl.
- Epidendrum pirrense Hágsater
- Epidendrum pitalense J.Linares & Hágsater
- Epidendrum pitanga Campacci
- Epidendrum pittieri Ames
- Epidendrum plagiophyllum Hágsater
- Epidendrum platychilum Schltr.
- Epidendrum platyclinium Hágsater & Dodson
- Epidendrum platyglossum Rchb.f.
- Epidendrum platynocturnum Hágsater & R.Jiménez
- Epidendrum platyoon Schltr.
- Epidendrum platyotis Rchb.f.
- Epidendrum platypetalonocturnum Hágsater & L.Sánchez
- Epidendrum platypetalum Hágsater
- Epidendrum platyphylloserpens Hágsater
- Epidendrum platyphyllostigma Hágsater & García-Cruz
- Epidendrum platypleuromegaloclinium Hágsater, Uribe Vélez & E.Santiago
- Epidendrum platystachyum Hágsater
- Epidendrum platystele Hágsater & E.Santiago
- Epidendrum platystigma Rchb.f.
- Epidendrum platystomoides Hágsater & L.Sánchez
- Epidendrum platystomum Hágsater & L.Sánchez
- Epidendrum platytropis Hágsater & E.Santiago
- Epidendrum pleiobracteatum Hágsater & E.Santiago
- Epidendrum pleurobotrys Schltr.
- Epidendrum pleurotallipnevma Hágsater, Edquén & E.Santiago
- Epidendrum pleurothalloides Hágsater
- Epidendrum plurifolionocturnum Hágsater & L.Sánchez
- Epidendrum pluriracemosum Hágsater & E.Santiago
- Epidendrum podocarpense Hágsater & E.Santiago
- Epidendrum podocarpophilum Schltr.
- Epidendrum podostylos Hágsater & Dodson
- Epidendrum poeppigii Hágsater
- Epidendrum pogonochilum Carnevali & G.A.Romero
- Epidendrum pollardii Hágsater
- Epidendrum polyanthogastrium Hágsater & Dodson
- Epidendrum polyanthostachyum Hágsater, E.Santiago & García-Ram.
- Epidendrum polyanthum Lindl.
- Epidendrum polychlamys Schltr.
- Epidendrum polychromum Hágsater
- Epidendrum polygonatum Lindl.
- Epidendrum polystachyoides Kraenzl.
- Epidendrum polystachyum Kunth
- Epidendrum polythallum Est.Domínguez, J.S.Moreno, Hágsater & E.Santiago
- Epidendrum pomacochense Hágsater
- Epidendrum pomecense Hágsater
- Epidendrum popayanense F.Lehm. & Kraenzl.
- Epidendrum porpax Rchb.f.
- Epidendrum porphyreodiscum Hágsater, D.Trujillo & E.Santiago
- Epidendrum porphyreonocturnum Hágsater & R.Jiménez
- Epidendrum porphyreum Lindl.
- Epidendrum porphyrostachyum Hágsater & E.Santiago
- Epidendrum porquerense F.Lehm. & Kraenzl.
- Epidendrum portillae Hágsater & Dodson
- Epidendrum portokalium Hágsater & Dodson
- Epidendrum portoricense Hágsater & Ackerman
- Epidendrum portotambillense Hágsater & E.Santiago
- Epidendrum posadarum Hágsater
- Epidendrum posticorevolutum Hágsater, Cisneros & Edquén
- Epidendrum powellii Schltr.
- Epidendrum pozoi Hágsater & Dodson
- Epidendrum praeteritum Hágsater
- Epidendrum praetervisum Rchb.f.
- Epidendrum prancei Hágsater & L.Sánchez
- Epidendrum prasinum Schltr.
- Epidendrum presbyteri-ludgeronis Gomes Ferreira
- Epidendrum prietoi Hágsater & Dodson
- Epidendrum pristes Rchb.f.
- Epidendrum probiflorum Schltr.
- Epidendrum probosantherum Hágsater
- Epidendrum proligerum Barb.Rodr.
- Epidendrum propinquum A.Rich. & Galeotti
- Epidendrum prostratum (Lindl.) Cogn.
- Epidendrum pseudapaganum D.E.Benn. & Christenson
- Epidendrum pseudavicula Kraenzl.
- Epidendrum pseudepidendrum Rchb.f.
- Epidendrum pseudoalbiflorum D.E.Benn. & Christenson
- Epidendrum pseudobarbeyanurn Pupulin & Karremans
- Epidendrum pseudocardioepichilum Becerra & Hágsater
- Epidendrum pseudocernuum Carnevali & I.Ramírez
- Epidendrum pseudodifforme Hoehne & Schltr.
- Epidendrum pseudoglobiflorum Hágsater & Dodson
- Epidendrum pseudogramineum D.E.Benn. & Christenson
- Epidendrum pseudokillipii Hágsater & L.Sánchez
- Epidendrum pseudolankesteri Carnevali & G.A.Romero
- Epidendrum pseudomagnisaxicola L.Valenz., E.Santiago & Hágsater
- Epidendrum pseudomancum Hágsater & L.Sánchez
- Epidendrum pseudonocturnum Hágsater & Dodson
- Epidendrum pseudopaniculatum Dodson
- Epidendrum pseudopolystachyum D.E.Benn. & Christenson
- Epidendrum pseudoramosum Schltr.
- Epidendrum pseudosarcoglottis Hágsater & Dodson
- Epidendrum pseudoschumannianum Fowlie
- Epidendrum pseudospathoides Hágsater & E.Santiago
- Epidendrum psilosepalum Hágsater & E.Santiago
- Epidendrum pterocaulum Hágsater & E.Santiago
- Epidendrum pterogastrium Hágsater
- Epidendrum pteroglottis Schltr.
- Epidendrum pterostele Hágsater & Dodson
- Epidendrum ptochicum Hágsater
- Epidendrum pubiflorum C.Schweinf.
- Epidendrum pucunoense Hágsater & Dodson
- Epidendrum pudicum Ames
- Epidendrum pulchrum (Schltr.) Hágsater & Dodson
- Epidendrum pumilum Rolfe
- Epidendrum punense Hágsater & Dodson
- Epidendrum puniceoluteum F.Pinheiro & F.Barros
- Epidendrum puracestachyum Hágsater & E.Santiago
- Epidendrum purdiei Hágsater & E.Santiago
- Epidendrum purpurascens Focke
- Epidendrum purpureocaule Essers & Sambin
- Epidendrum × purpureum Barb.Rodr.
- Epidendrum purum Lindl.
- Epidendrum pustulosum Rinc.-González, García-Revelo & Hágsater
- Epidendrum putidocardiophyllum Hágsater & Dodson
- Epidendrum putumayoense Hágsater & L.Sánchez
- Epidendrum puyoense Hágsater & Dodson

== Q ==
- Epidendrum quadrangulatum A.D.Hawkes
- Epidendrum quadratilobum Hágsater, E.Santiago & Edquén
- Epidendrum queirozianum Campacci & J.B.F.Silva
- Epidendrum quinquecallosum Schltr.
- Epidendrum quinquepartitum Schltr.
- Epidendrum quisayanum Schltr.
- Epidendrum quispei Hágsater & Collantes
- Epidendrum quitensium Rchb.f.

== R ==
- Epidendrum radicans Pav. ex Lindl.
- Epidendrum radioferens (Ames, F.T.Hubb. & C.Schweinf.) Hágsater
- Epidendrum rafael-lucasii Hágsater
- Epidendrum ramirez-santae Sauleda & Uribe Vélez
- Epidendrum ramiro-medinae Hágsater & L.Sánchez
- Epidendrum ramonianum Schltr.
- Epidendrum ramosissimum Ames & C.Schweinf.
- Epidendrum ramosum Jacq.
- Epidendrum rauhii Hágsater
- Epidendrum ravetianum Sambin, Chiron & Essers
- Epidendrum reclinatum Carnevali & I.Ramírez
- Epidendrum recurvatum Lindl.
- Epidendrum recurvitepalostachyum Hágsater & E.Santiago
- Epidendrum reflexilobum C.Schweinf.
- Epidendrum reflexitepalum Hágsater, H.Medina & Cisneros
- Epidendrum refractum Lindl.
- Epidendrum reniconfusum Hágsater, E.Santiago & Dodson
- Epidendrum renilabioides Hágsater & Dodson
- Epidendrum renilabium Schltr.
- Epidendrum × renipichinchae Hágsater & E.Santiago
- Epidendrum renzii Garay & Dunst.
- Epidendrum repaskyae Hágsater, E.Santiago & J.Duarte
- Epidendrum repens Cogn.
- Epidendrum resectum Rchb.f.
- Epidendrum restrepoanum A.D.Hawkes
- Epidendrum retrosepalum Hágsater, Ric.Fernández & E.Santiago
- Epidendrum revertianum (Stehlé) Hágsater
- Epidendrum revolutum Barb.Rodr.
- Epidendrum rhaibogyrum Hágsater & E.Santiago
- Epidendrum rhizomaniacum Rchb.f.
- Epidendrum rhodanthum Hágsater & Dodson
- Epidendrum rhodochilum (Schltr.) Hágsater & Dodson
- Epidendrum rhodoides Hágsater & Dodson
- Epidendrum rhodovandoides Hágsater
- Epidendrum rhombicapitellatum Hágsater & Dodson
- Epidendrum rhombimancum Hágsater & L.Sánchez
- Epidendrum rhombobrachyphyllum Hágsater & E.Santiago
- Epidendrum rhombochilum L.O.Williams
- Epidendrum rhomboscutellum Hágsater & E.Santiago
- Epidendrum rhopalostele Hágsater & Dodson
- Epidendrum rigidiflorum Schltr.
- Epidendrum rigidum Jacq.
- Epidendrum rimarachinii Hágsater
- Epidendrum riobambae Schltr.
- Epidendrum riofrioae Hágsater, F.Werner & E.Santiago
- Epidendrum riverae Hágsater
- Epidendrum rivulare Lindl.
- Epidendrum robinson-galindoi Hágsater, Uribe Vélez & E.Santiago
- Epidendrum robustum Cogn.
- Epidendrum rocalderianum P.Ortiz & Hágsater
- Epidendrum rocioae Hágsater & Vásquez
- Epidendrum rodrigoi Hágsater
- Epidendrum roezlii Hágsater
- Epidendrum rojasii Cogn.
- Epidendrum rolfeanum F.Lehm. & Kraenzl.
- Epidendrum romanii Hágsater & Dodson
- Epidendrum romero-castannedae Hágsater & L.Sánchez
- Epidendrum roncanum Dodson & R.Vásquez
- Epidendrum rondoniense L.C.Menezes
- Epidendrum rondosianum C.Schweinf.
- Epidendrum roseoscriptum Hágsater
- Epidendrum rosilloi Hágsater
- Epidendrum rossanae Karremans
- Epidendrum rostrigerum Rchb.f.
- Epidendrum rothii A.D.Hawkes
- Epidendrum rotundifolium Hágsater & Dodson
- Epidendrum rousseauae Schltr.
- Epidendrum rousseffiana Collantes & Hágsater
- Epidendrum rowleyi Withner & Pollard
- Epidendrum rudolfii Karremans
- Epidendrum rugosum Ames
- Epidendrum rugulosum Schltr.
- Epidendrum ruizianum Steud.
- Epidendrum ruizlarreanum D.E.Benn. & Christenson
- Epidendrum rupestre Lindl.
- Epidendrum rupicola Cogn.
- Epidendrum rusbyi Hágsater & L.Sánchez

== S ==
- Epidendrum saccatum Hágsater
- Epidendrum saccirhodochilum Hágsater & E.Santiago
- Epidendrum sagasteguii Hágsater & E.Santiago
- Epidendrum salpichlamys Hágsater & E.Santiago
- Epidendrum saltatrix Karremans
- Epidendrum samaipatense Dodson & R.Vásquez
- Epidendrum sanchezii E.M.Pessoa & L.P.Félix
- Epidendrum sanchoi Ames
- Epidendrum sanctae-martae Schltr.
- Epidendrum sanctae-rosae Hágsater, Sauleda, Uribe Vélez & E.Santiago
- Epidendrum sanderi A.D.Hawkes
- Epidendrum sandiorum Hágsater, Karremans & L.Sánchez
- Epidendrum sanfranciscoense Hágsater, E.Santiago & Medina Tr.
- Epidendrum sangayense Hágsater & Dodson
- Epidendrum santaclarense Ames
- Epidendrum santaelenae Karremans
- Epidendrum santiagense Hágsater & Dodson
- Epidendrum sarcochilum Linden & Rchb.f.
- Epidendrum sarcodes Lindl.
- Epidendrum sarcoglottis Schltr.
- Epidendrum sarcostachyum Hágsater, E.Santiago & Becerra
- Epidendrum sarcostalix Rchb.f. & Warsz.
- Epidendrum saxatile Lindl.
- Epidendrum saxicola Kraenzl.
- Epidendrum saximontanum Pabst
- Epidendrum scabrum Ruiz & Pav.
- Epidendrum scalpelligerum Rchb.f.
- Epidendrum scharfii Hágsater & Dodson
- Epidendrum schistochilum Schltr.
- Epidendrum schistostemum Hágsater, Laube & L.Sánchez
- Epidendrum schizoclinandrium D.E.Benn. & Christenson
- Epidendrum schlechterianum Ames
- Epidendrum schlimii Rchb.f.
- Epidendrum schmidtchenii Hágsater & E.Santiago
- Epidendrum schnitteri Schltr.
- Epidendrum schumannianum Schltr.
- Epidendrum schunkei D.E.Benn. & Christenson
- Epidendrum schweinfurthianum Correll
- Epidendrum scopulorum Rchb.f.
- Epidendrum sculptum Rchb.f.
- Epidendrum scutella Lindl.
- Epidendrum scytocladium Schltr.
- Epidendrum secundum Jacq.
- Epidendrum selaginella Schltr.
- Epidendrum semiteretifolium D.E.Benn. & Christenson
- Epidendrum septipartitum Hágsater, Dalström & Ruíz Pérez
- Epidendrum septumspinae D.E.Benn. & Christenson
- Epidendrum serpens Lindl.
- Epidendrum serrulatum Sw.
- Epidendrum serruliferum Schltr.
- Epidendrum sertorum Garay & Dunst.
- Epidendrum shigenobui Hágsater
- Epidendrum sholletiae Hágsater, L.Valenz. & J.Duarte
- Epidendrum sidereum Karremans
- Epidendrum sierrae-peladae Kraenzl.
- Epidendrum sigmodiothoneum Hágsater & E.Santiago
- Epidendrum sigmoideum Hágsater
- Epidendrum sigmostachyum Hágsater, E.Santiago & D.Trujillo
- Epidendrum sigsigense Hágsater & Dodson
- Epidendrum silvae Hágsater & V.P.Castro
- Epidendrum silvanum V.P.Castro & Chiron
- Epidendrum silverstonei Hágsater
- Epidendrum simulacrum Ames
- Epidendrum sinac Karremans
- Epidendrum singuliflorum Schltr.
- Epidendrum sinnamaryense Sambin & Chiron
- Epidendrum sinuosum Lindl.
- Epidendrum siphonosepaloides T.Hashim.
- Epidendrum siphonosepalum Garay & Dunst.
- Epidendrum sisgaense Hágsater
- Epidendrum sisnanense Hágsater & E.Santiago
- Epidendrum skutchii Ames, F.T.Hubb. & C.Schweinf.
- Epidendrum smaragdinum Lindl.
- Epidendrum smithii Schltr.
- Epidendrum sneidernii Hágsater & E.Santiago
- Epidendrum sobralioides Ames & Correll
- Epidendrum socorrense Rchb.f. & Warsz.
- Epidendrum sodiroi Schltr.
- Epidendrum solomonii Hágsater & L.Sánchez
- Epidendrum sonia-juaniorum Zambrano & Hágsater
- Epidendrum sonsonense Rinc.-González, E.Santiago & Hágsater
- Epidendrum sophronitis Lindl. & Rchb.f.
- Epidendrum sophronitoides F.Lehm. & Kraenzl.
- Epidendrum soratae Rchb.f.
- Epidendrum sotoanum Karremans & Hágsater
- Epidendrum spasmosum Hágsater & Dodson
- Epidendrum spathatum Schltr.
- Epidendrum × spathiporphyreum Hágsater & Dodson
- Epidendrum spathulipetalum Hágsater & Dressler
- Epidendrum sphaeranthum Schltr.
- Epidendrum sphaerostachyum Rchb.f.
- Epidendrum sphenostele Hágsater & E.Santiago
- Epidendrum spicatum Hook.f.
- Epidendrum spiculiferum Karremans & Bogarín
- Epidendrum spilotum Garay & Dunst.
- Epidendrum spinescens Lindl.
- Epidendrum splendens Schltr.
- Epidendrum spruceanum Lindl.
- Epidendrum stahlii Hágsater & E.Santiago
- Epidendrum stalkyi Carnevali & G.A.Romero
- Epidendrum stallforthianum Kraenzl.
- Epidendrum stamfordianum Bateman
- Epidendrum stangeanum Rchb.f.
- Epidendrum stanhopeanum Kraenzl.
- Epidendrum stellidifforme Hágsater & Dodson
- Epidendrum stenobractistachyum Hágsater & E.Santiago
- Epidendrum stenocalymmum Hágsater & G.Calat.
- Epidendrum stenopetaloides Kraenzl.
- Epidendrum stenophyllum Hágsater & Dodson
- Epidendrum stenophyton Schltr.
- Epidendrum stenoselaginella Hágsater & E.Santiago
- Epidendrum stenostachyum Hágsater & E.Santiago
- Epidendrum sterroanthum Schltr.
- Epidendrum sterrophyllum Schltr.
- Epidendrum stevensii Hágsater
- Epidendrum stevensonii Hágsater & Dodson
- Epidendrum steyermarkii A.D.Hawkes
- Epidendrum stictoglossum Hágsater & D.Trujillo
- Epidendrum stiliferum Dressler
- Epidendrum stolidium Hágsater
- Epidendrum storkii Ames
- Epidendrum strictiforme C.Schweinf.
- Epidendrum strictum Schltr.
- Epidendrum strobilicaule Hágsater & Benelli
- Epidendrum strobiliferum Rchb.f.
- Epidendrum strobiloides Garay & Dunst.
- Epidendrum suaveolens Ames
- Epidendrum suavis (Rchb.f. & Warsz.) Løjtnant
- Epidendrum subadnatum Rchb.f.
- Epidendrum subfloribundum Schltr.
- Epidendrum subliberhombicum Hágsater & E.Santiago
- Epidendrum subliberum C.Schweinf.
- Epidendrum sublobatum C.Schweinf. ex Garay & Dunst.
- Epidendrum subnutans Ames & C.Schweinf.
- Epidendrum suborbiculare Schltr.
- Epidendrum subpurum Rchb.f.
- Epidendrum subreniforme C.Schweinf.
- Epidendrum subumbellatum Hoffmanns.
- Epidendrum successivum Hágsater & F.E.L.Miranda
- Epidendrum succulentum Hágsater
- Epidendrum sucumbiense Hágsater & Dodson
- Epidendrum suinii Hágsater & Dodson
- Epidendrum sulcatum Ames
- Epidendrum sumacoense Hágsater & Dodson
- Epidendrum sumacostachyum Hágsater & E.Santiago
- Epidendrum sumapacense Hágsater & E.Santiago
- Epidendrum summerhayesii Hágsater
- Epidendrum superpositum Garay
- Epidendrum susannae Hágsater, O.Pérez & E.Parra
- Epidendrum suturatum Hágsater & Dressler
- Epidendrum swartzii (Rchb.f. ex Griseb.) Hágsater
- Epidendrum sympetalostele Hágsater & L.Sánchez
- Epidendrum sympodiale Schltr.
- Epidendrum synchronum Hágsater
- Epidendrum syringodes Schltr.
- Epidendrum syringothyrsus H.J.Veitch

== T ==
- Epidendrum tacanaense Hágsater, Soto Arenas & E.Santiago
- Epidendrum tacarcunense Hágsater
- Epidendrum tachirense Foldats
- Epidendrum taguatingense (Brieger & Bicalho) Hágsater, Meneguzzo & L.Sánchez
- Epidendrum talamancanum (J.T.Atwood) Mora-Ret. & García Castro
- Epidendrum tamaense Foldats
- Epidendrum tambillense Hágsater
- Epidendrum tandapianum Dodson & Hágsater
- Epidendrum tandapioides Hágsater
- Epidendrum tenax Rchb.f.
- Epidendrum tenue Lindl.
- Epidendrum tenuicaule F.Lehm. & Kraenzl.
- Epidendrum tenuispathum C.Schweinf.
- Epidendrum tenuisulcatum (Dressler) Hágsater
- Epidendrum tequendamae F.Lehm. & Kraenzl.
- Epidendrum tessmannii Mansf.
- Epidendrum tetartociclium Collantes & Hágsater
- Epidendrum tetraceros Rchb.f.
- Epidendrum tetracuniculatum Hágsater, Edquén, E.Santiago & Náquira
- Epidendrum tetragonioides Hágsater & Dodson
- Epidendrum tetralobum Hágsater & E.Santiago
- Epidendrum teuscherianum A.D.Hawkes
- Epidendrum thelephorum Hágsater & Dodson
- Epidendrum theodori Schltr.
- Epidendrum thermophilum Hágsater & Dodson
- Epidendrum thompsonii Hágsater & Dodson
- Epidendrum thurstoniorum Hágsater
- Epidendrum tigriphyllum Hágsater
- Epidendrum timbiquiense Hágsater & E.Santiago
- Epidendrum tingo-mariae Hágsater
- Epidendrum tipuloideum Lindl.
- Epidendrum tiwinzaense Hágsater & Dodson
- Epidendrum tobarii Hágsater & Dodson
- Epidendrum tolimense Lindl.
- Epidendrum tonduzii Lank.
- Epidendrum torquatum Lindl.
- Epidendrum torraense Hágsater & Silverst.
- Epidendrum tortipetalum Scheeren
- Epidendrum totoroense J.S.Moreno, Hágsater, E.Santiago & Erazo
- Epidendrum tovarense Rchb.f.
- Epidendrum trachychlaena Schltr.
- Epidendrum trachydipterum Hágsater, Nauray & E.Santiago
- Epidendrum trachypentatropis Hágsater & E.Santiago
- Epidendrum trachypus F.Lehm. & Kraenzl.
- Epidendrum trachysepalum Hágsater
- Epidendrum trachythece Schltr.
- Epidendrum transversellipticum Hágsater
- Epidendrum transversovatum Hágsater & Dodson
- Epidendrum trapeziinocturnum Bar.-Colm. & Hágsater
- Epidendrum trapezilabiatum Hágsater & E.Santiago
- Epidendrum trialatum Hágsater
- Epidendrum triangulabium Ames & C.Schweinf.
- Epidendrum trianthum Schltr.
- Epidendrum tricrure Rchb.f. & Warsz.
- Epidendrum tridactylum Lindl.
- Epidendrum tridens Poepp. & Endl.
- Epidendrum trifidum Schltr.
- Epidendrum triflorum Ruiz & Pav.
- Epidendrum trilobochilum Hágsater & Dodson
- Epidendrum triloboleptophytum Hágsater, Naranjo & A.E.Mend.
- Epidendrum triodon Hágsater & Dodson
- Epidendrum tripetaloides Hágsater & E.Santiago
- Epidendrum tritropianthum Hágsater & E.Santiago
- Epidendrum tropidioides Garay
- Epidendrum tropinectarium Hágsater & E.Santiago
- Epidendrum troxalis Luer
- Epidendrum trullatigeminiflorum Hágsater, E.Santiago & D.Trujillo
- Epidendrum trullatum Hágsater, L.Valenz. & E.Santiago
- Epidendrum trullichilum Hágsater & Dodson
- Epidendrum trulliforme Garay & Dunst.
- Epidendrum tulcanense Hágsater & Dodson
- Epidendrum tumuc-humaciense (Veyret) Carnevali & G.A.Romero
- Epidendrum tundaycirrhatum Hágsater & Tobar
- Epidendrum tundaymense Hágsater, E.Santiago & Tobar
- Epidendrum tungurahuae (Szlach. & Mytnik) J.M.H.Shaw
- Epidendrum turialvae Rchb.f.
- Epidendrum tuxtlense Hágsater, García-Cruz & L.Sánchez
- Epidendrum tziscaoense Hágsater

== U ==
- Epidendrum ulcumanoae Hágsater, G.Gerlach & L.Valenz.
- Epidendrum ulei Schltr.
- Epidendrum uleinanodes Hágsater
- Epidendrum umbelliferum J.F.Gmel.
- Epidendrum unchogense Ocupa & E.Santiago
- Epidendrum uncinatum D.E.Benn. & Christenson
- Epidendrum unguiculatum (C.Schweinf.) Garay & Dunst.
- Epidendrum unicallosum Hágsater & E.Santiago
- Epidendrum unifoliatum Schltr.
- Epidendrum upanodifforme Hágsater & Dodson
- Epidendrum urbanianum Cogn.
- Epidendrum uribei A.D.Hawkes
- Epidendrum uribeianum J.M.H.Shaw
- Epidendrum urichianum Carnevali, Foldats & I.Ramírez
- Epidendrum urraoense Hágsater
- Epidendrum urubambae Hágsater
- Epidendrum usurpator Karremans
- Epidendrum utcuyacuense Hágsater
- Epidendrum utyumii Karremans

== V ==
- Epidendrum valcinii Sambin, Essers & Chiron
- Epidendrum vale-ramiroi L.Valenz., E.Santiago & Hágsater
- Epidendrum valenteanum Campacci & Locatelli
- Epidendrum valenzuelae Hágsater & E.Santiago
- Epidendrum vallis-silentii M.Díaz & Karremans
- Epidendrum vallisoletanum Hágsater & E.Santiago
- Epidendrum vandifolium Lindl.
- Epidendrum vareschii Foldats
- Epidendrum vargasii Christenson & Nauray
- Epidendrum vasquezii Hágsater & L.Sánchez
- Epidendrum vegae Chocce & Hágsater
- Epidendrum veltenianum Campacci
- Epidendrum venceremos Hágsater, E.Santiago & Edquén
- Epidendrum ventricosum Lindl.
- Epidendrum veraguasense Hágsater
- Epidendrum vernixium Rchb.f. & Warsz.
- Epidendrum veroreveloi Hágsater & Dodson
- Epidendrum veroscriptum Hágsater
- Epidendrum verrucosum Sw.
- Epidendrum vesicatum Lindl.
- Epidendrum vesicicaule L.O.Williams
- Epidendrum vesicinanum Hágsater & L.Valenz.
- Epidendrum vexillium Hágsater
- Epidendrum vidal-senegei Hágsater
- Epidendrum vieirae Hágsater
- Epidendrum vigiaense I.Bock
- Epidendrum vigosi Hágsater & E.Santiago
- Epidendrum villahermosaense Sierra-Ariza & Hágsater
- Epidendrum villanuevae Rinc.-González, O.Melo, Hágsater & E.Santiago
- Epidendrum villegastigma Hágsater & García-Cruz
- Epidendrum villenae Hágsater & E.Santiago
- Epidendrum villotae Hágsater & Dodson
- Epidendrum vincentinum Lindl.
- Epidendrum vinosum Schltr.
- Epidendrum violascens Ridl.
- Epidendrum violetense Hágsater & Dodson
- Epidendrum viride Ruiz & Pav.
- Epidendrum viridibrunneum Rchb.f.
- Epidendrum viridiochraceum Zambrano, Hágsater & Solano
- Epidendrum viridipurpureum Hook.
- Epidendrum viridium Zambrano, Hágsater & Solano
- Epidendrum viviparum Lindl.
- Epidendrum volubile Ruiz & Pav.
- Epidendrum volutum Lindl. & Paxton
- Epidendrum vulcanicola A.H.Heller
- Epidendrum vulcanicum Schltr.
- Epidendrum vulgoamparoanum Hágsater & L.Sánchez

== W ==
- Epidendrum waiandtii V.P.Castro
- Epidendrum wallisii Rchb.f.
- Epidendrum warrasii Pabst
- Epidendrum warszewiczii Rchb.f.
- Epidendrum wayqechaense Hágsater, E.Santiago & J.Duarte
- Epidendrum weberbauerianum Kraenzl.
- Epidendrum weerakitianum Hágsater, O.Pérez & E.Santiago
- Epidendrum weigendii Hágsater & Cisneros
- Epidendrum welsii-windischii Pabst
- Epidendrum wendtii Hágsater & Salazar
- Epidendrum wercklei Schltr.
- Epidendrum werffii Dodson & Hágsater
- Epidendrum werneri Schltr.
- Epidendrum whittenii Hágsater & Dodson
- Epidendrum wieslawii (Szlach. & Mytnik) J.M.H.Shaw
- Epidendrum wigginsii Hágsater & Dodson
- Epidendrum williamsii Dodson
- Epidendrum witherspooniorum Hágsater & Dressler
- Epidendrum wolfii Hágsater & E.Santiago
- Epidendrum woytkowskianum A.D.Hawkes
- Epidendrum wrightii Lindl.
- Epidendrum wurdackii Hágsater, E.Santiago & Salas Guerr.

== X ==
- Epidendrum xanthinum Lindl.
- Epidendrum xanthoianthinum Hágsater
- Epidendrum xantholeucum Rchb.f.
- Epidendrum xelidonourum Hágsater & H.Medina
- Epidendrum xelidorimarachinii Hágsater & E.Santiago
- Epidendrum xerophyticum Hágsater & E.Santiago
- Epidendrum xylostachyum Lindl.
- Epidendrum xytriophorum Rchb.f. & Warsz.

== Y ==
- Epidendrum yacuriense Hágsater & H.Medina
- Epidendrum yambalense Hágsater & Dodson
- Epidendrum yambrasbambense Hágsater
- Epidendrum yanachagaense Hágsater
- Epidendrum yanatilense Damian & Hágsater
- Epidendrum yanesharum M.E.Acuña, Chocce & Hágsater
- Epidendrum yaracuyense Carnevali & G.A.Romero
- Epidendrum yarumalense Hágsater & E.Santiago
- Epidendrum yasgolgaense Hágsater, Edquén, Salas Guerr. & E.Santiago
- Epidendrum yohanii Sambin & Chiron
- Epidendrum yojoaense Hágsater & L.Sánchez
- Epidendrum youngii Hágsater & E.Santiago
- Epidendrum ypsilum Hágsater & E.Santiago
- Epidendrum yumboense Hágsater, O.Pérez & E.Santiago
- Epidendrum yungasense Rolfe ex Rusby

== Z ==
- Epidendrum zamorense Hágsater & Dodson
- Epidendrum zanonii Dod
- Epidendrum zappii Pabst
- Epidendrum zarumense Hágsater & Dodson
- Epidendrum zipaquiranum Schltr.
- Epidendrum zongoincomptum Hágsater & E.Santiago
- Epidendrum zosterifolium F.Lehm. & Kraenzl.
- Epidendrum zunigae Hágsater, Karremans & Bogarín
