= Epidendrum pseudodifforme =

Scientific classification
- Kingdom: Plantae
- Clade: Tracheophytes
- Clade: Angiosperms
- Clade: Monocots
- Order: Asparagales
- Family: Orchidaceae
- Subfamily: Epidendroideae
- Genus: Epidendrum
- Species: E. pseudodifforme

Binomial name
- Epidendrum pseudodifforme Hoehne & Schltr. (1925)

Synonyms
- Epidendrum campaccii Hágsater & L.Sánchez (1993); Epidendrum thiagoi Hágsater & L.Sánchez (2010)

Species of orchid

Epidendrum pseudodifforme Hoehne & Schltr. (1925) is an epiphytic orchid, native to Brazil.

It should not be confused with Epidendrum pseudodifforme Hoehne & Schltr. (1926), an illegitimate name, which is a synonym for Epidendrum subumbellatum.
