= Epidendrum stenophyton =

Scientific classification
- Kingdom: Plantae
- Clade: Tracheophytes
- Clade: Angiosperms
- Clade: Monocots
- Order: Asparagales
- Family: Orchidaceae
- Subfamily: Epidendroideae
- Genus: Epidendrum
- Species: E. stenophyton

Binomial name
- Epidendrum stenophyton Schltr.

Synonyms
- Epidendrum frigidum var. stenophyton (Schltr.) C.Schweinf

Species of orchid

Epidendrum stenophyton is an Epidendrum orchid native to Bolivia, Ecuador, Peru and Venezuela.

== Description ==
Epidendrum stenophyton is notable for inhabiting the high altitude tropical cloud forest (3–4 km high) near the tree line, sometimes on trees and sometimes terrestrially. The round stem, no more than 4 mm in diameter, grows from a half to a meter tall. The stem is covered by foliaceous sheathes of the distichous leaves. The leathery leaves, up to 60 mm long by 8 mm wide, are ovate-oblong, obtuse at the end, and curve backward at the edges. The erect racemose inflorescence arises from the apex of the stem, without any spathe at the base. The flowers are pale rose, green, or yellow. The rigid sepals and petals do not open widely, but surround the cordate lip which is adnate to the column to its apex and has an entire margin.
