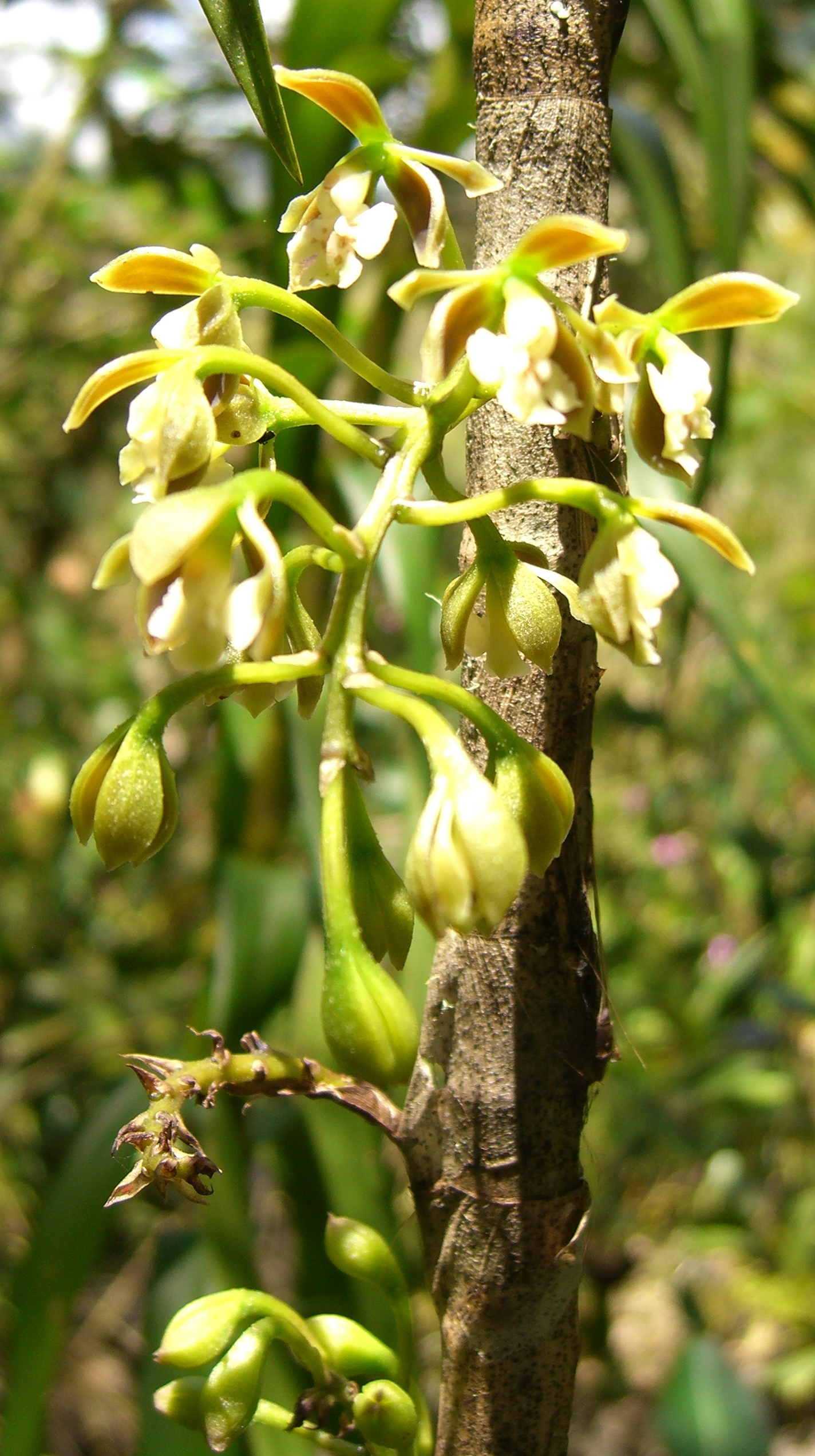

Scientific classification
- Kingdom: Plantae
- Clade: Tracheophytes
- Clade: Angiosperms
- Clade: Monocots
- Order: Asparagales
- Family: Orchidaceae
- Subfamily: Epidendroideae
- Tribe: Epidendreae
- Subtribe: Laeliinae
- Genus: Epidendrum
- Species: E. bambusiforme

Binomial name
- Epidendrum bambusiforme Kraenzl.

= Epidendrum bambusiforme =

Species of orchid

Epidendrum bambusiforme is a species of orchid in the genus Epidendrum native to Peru.
