= Epidendrum alsum =

Scientific classification
- Kingdom: Plantae
- Clade: Tracheophytes
- Clade: Angiosperms
- Clade: Monocots
- Order: Asparagales
- Family: Orchidaceae
- Subfamily: Epidendroideae
- Tribe: Epidendreae
- Subtribe: Laeliinae
- Genus: Epidendrum
- Species: E. alsum

Binomial name
- Epidendrum alsum Ridl.

Species of flowering plant

Epidendrum alsum is a species of flowering plant in the family Orchidaceae, native to south-east Venezuela and Guyana. It was first described by Henry Nicholas Ridley in 1886.
