= Epidendrum parahybunense =

Scientific classification
- Kingdom: Plantae
- Clade: Tracheophytes
- Clade: Angiosperms
- Clade: Monocots
- Order: Asparagales
- Family: Orchidaceae
- Subfamily: Epidendroideae
- Tribe: Epidendreae
- Subtribe: Laeliinae
- Genus: Epidendrum
- Species: E. parahybunense

Binomial name
- Epidendrum parahybunense Barb.Rodr.

Species of orchid

Epidendrum parahybunense is a species of orchid of the genus Epidendrum. This is an epiphytic orchid occurring in Brazil.
