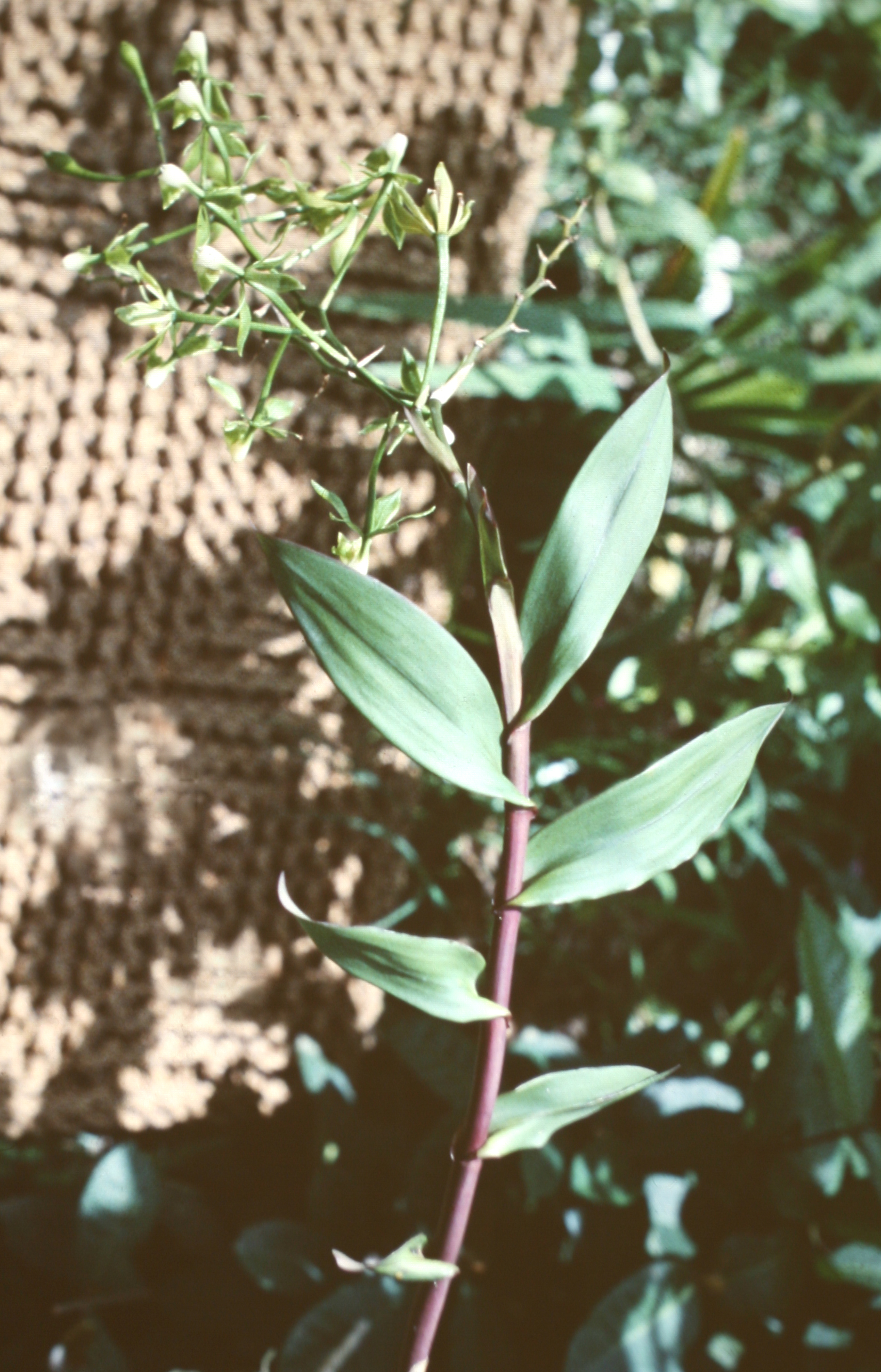

Scientific classification
- Kingdom: Plantae
- Clade: Tracheophytes
- Clade: Angiosperms
- Clade: Monocots
- Order: Asparagales
- Family: Orchidaceae
- Subfamily: Epidendroideae
- Genus: Epidendrum
- Species: E. unguiculatum

Binomial name
- Epidendrum unguiculatum (C. Schweinf.) Garay & Dunst. (1976)

Synonyms
- Epidendrum paniculatum var. unguiculatum C. Schweinf. (1943) (Basionym)

= Epidendrum unguiculatum =

Species of orchid

Epidendrum unguiculatum is a species of orchid.

Media related to Epidendrum unguiculatum at Wikimedia Commons
