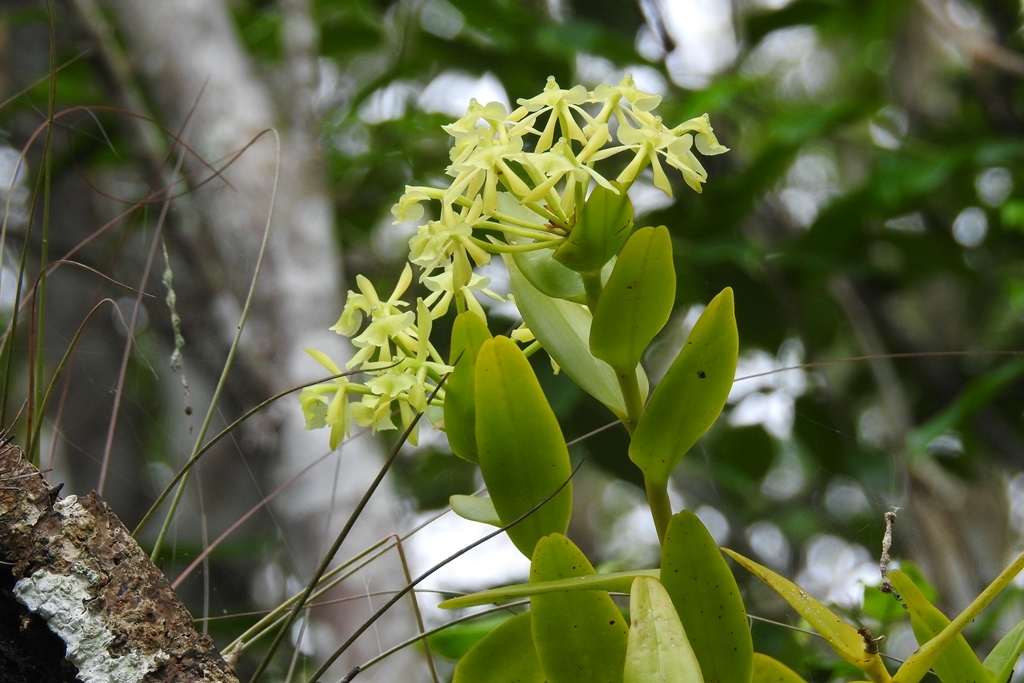

Scientific classification
- Kingdom: Plantae
- Clade: Tracheophytes
- Clade: Angiosperms
- Clade: Monocots
- Order: Asparagales
- Family: Orchidaceae
- Subfamily: Epidendroideae
- Tribe: Epidendreae
- Subtribe: Laeliinae
- Genus: Epidendrum
- Species: E. chlorocorymbos

Binomial name
- Epidendrum chlorocorymbos Schltr.

= Epidendrum chlorocorymbos =

Species of plant

Epidendrum chlorocorymbos is a species of flowering plant in the family Orchidaceae, native from central Mexico through Central America to Colombia. It was first described by Rudolf Schlechter in 1922.

== Distribution ==
Epidendrum chlorocorymbos is native to Colombia, Costa Rica, Guatemala, Honduras, Mexico, Nicaragua and Panama.
