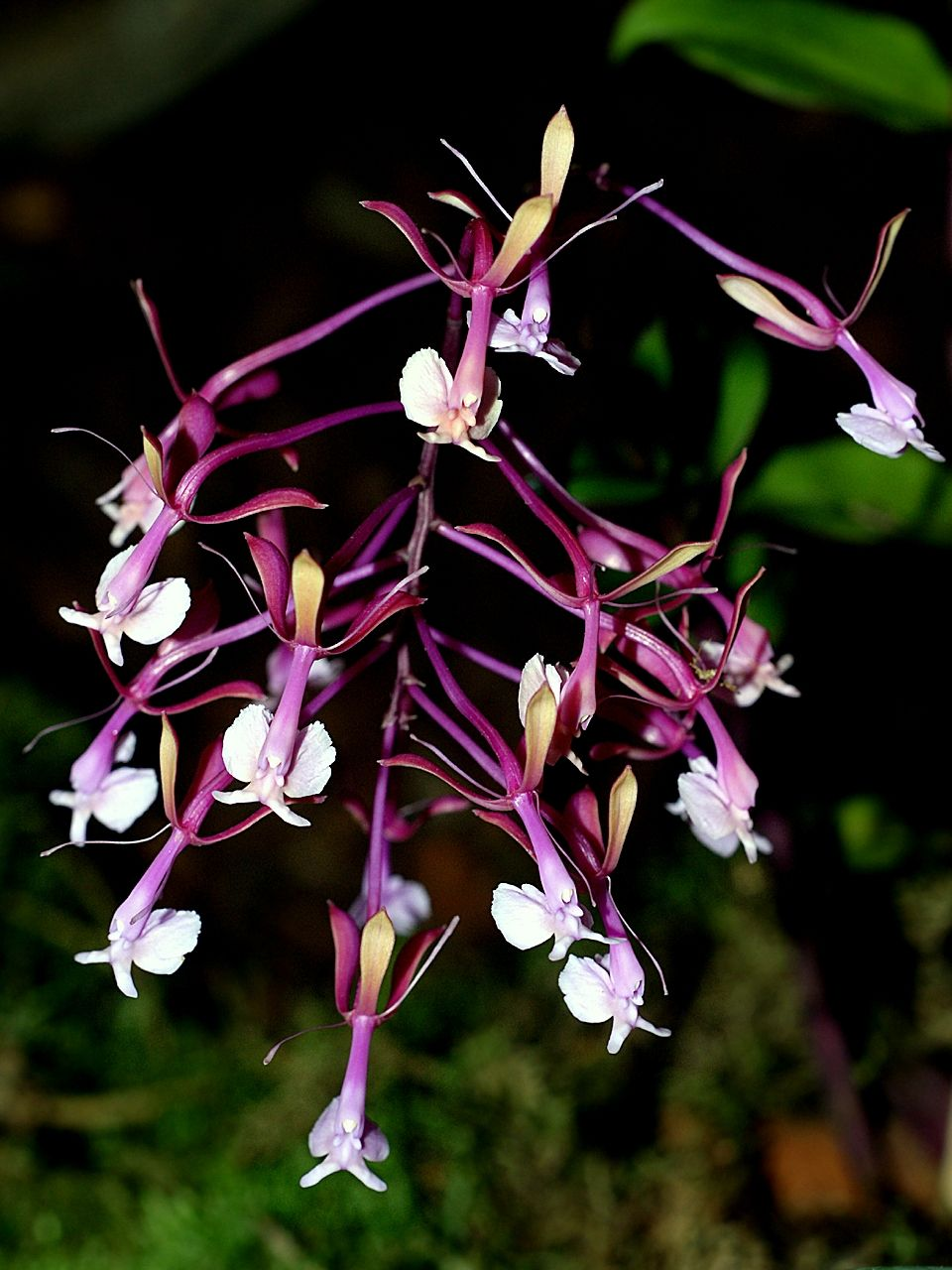

Scientific classification
- Kingdom: Plantae
- Clade: Tracheophytes
- Clade: Angiosperms
- Clade: Monocots
- Order: Asparagales
- Family: Orchidaceae
- Subfamily: Epidendroideae
- Tribe: Epidendreae
- Subtribe: Laeliinae
- Genus: Epidendrum
- Species: E. capricornu

Binomial name
- Epidendrum capricornu Kraenzl.

= Epidendrum capricornu =

Goat-horned epidendrum

Species of orchid

Epidendrum capricornu is a species of orchid in the genus Epidendrum native to southern Ecuador and north Peru. It is known as the goat-horned epidendrum.
