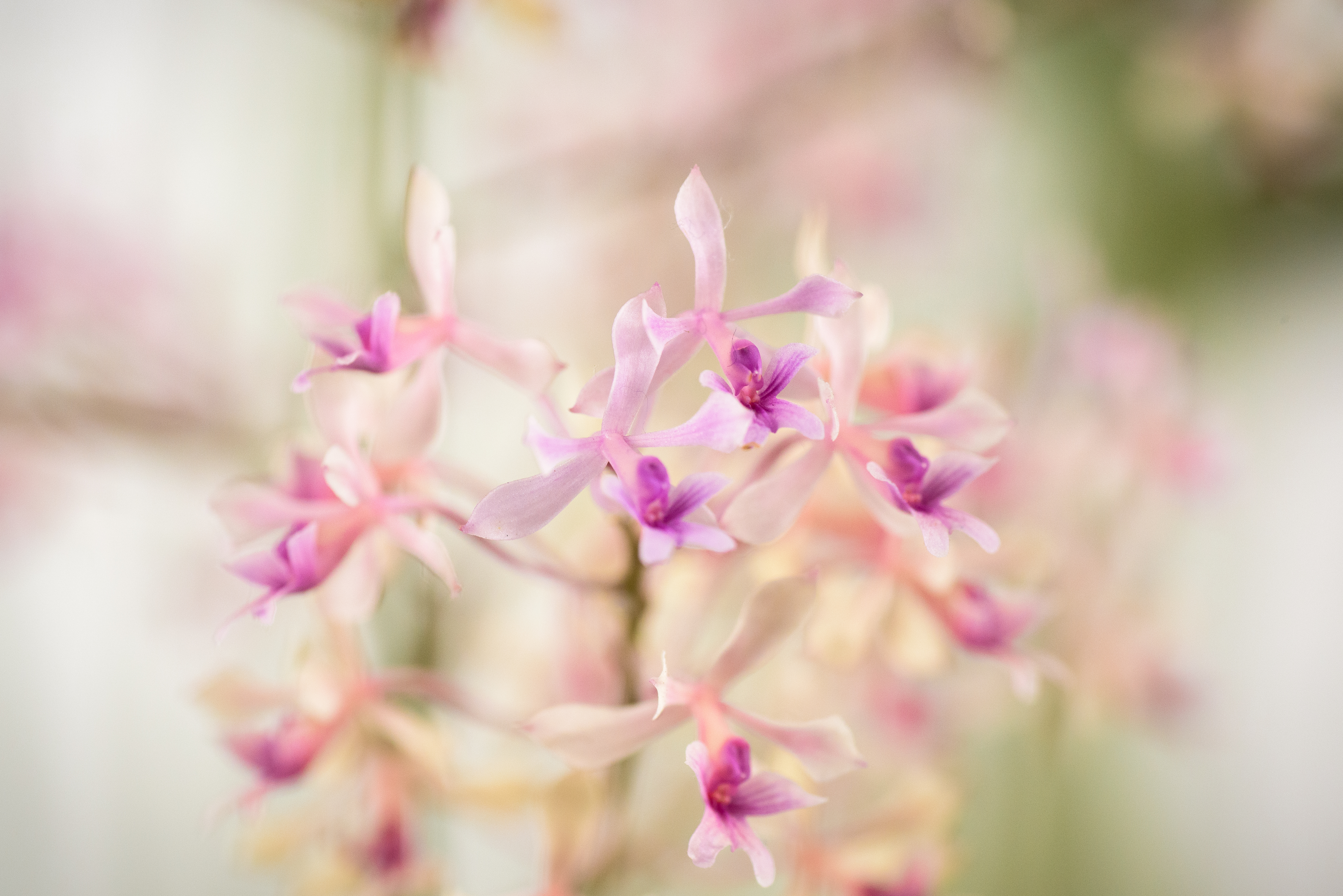

Scientific classification
- Kingdom: Plantae
- Clade: Tracheophytes
- Clade: Angiosperms
- Clade: Monocots
- Order: Asparagales
- Family: Orchidaceae
- Subfamily: Epidendroideae
- Tribe: Epidendreae
- Subtribe: Laeliinae
- Genus: Epidendrum
- Species: E. rondoniense

Binomial name
- Epidendrum rondoniense L.C.Menezes

= Epidendrum rondoniense =

Species of orchid

Epidendrum rondoniense is an epiphytic species of orchid of the genus Epidendrum, occurring in Brazil.
