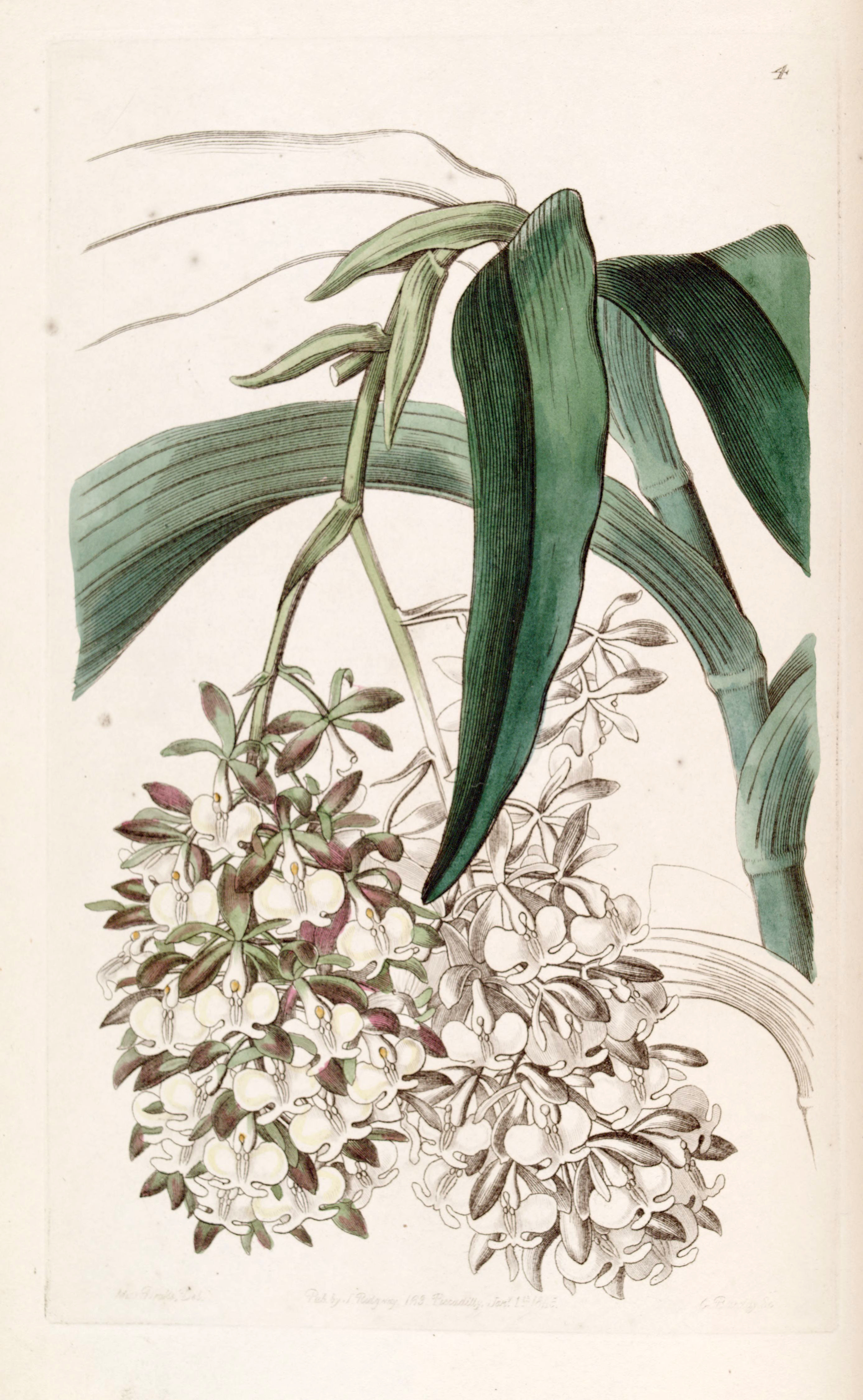

Scientific classification
- Kingdom: Plantae
- Clade: Tracheophytes
- Clade: Angiosperms
- Clade: Monocots
- Order: Asparagales
- Family: Orchidaceae
- Subfamily: Epidendroideae
- Genus: Epidendrum
- Species: E. dipus

Binomial name
- Epidendrum dipus Lindl.

Synonyms
- Epidendrum nutans var. dipus (Lindl.) Lindl.

= Epidendrum dipus =

Species of orchid

Epidendrum dipus is a species of orchid in the genus Epidendrum.
