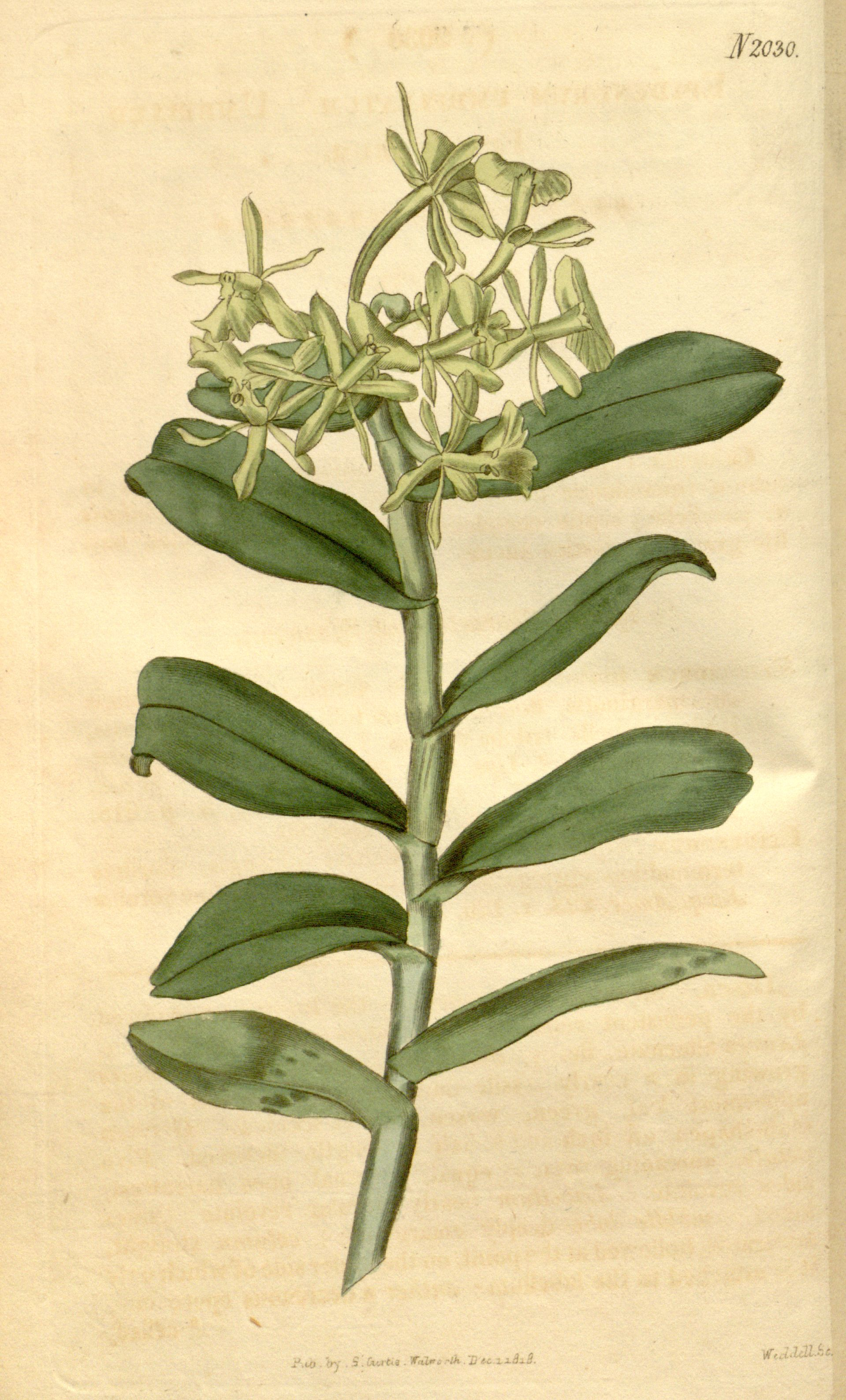

Scientific classification
- Kingdom: Plantae
- Clade: Tracheophytes
- Clade: Angiosperms
- Clade: Monocots
- Order: Asparagales
- Family: Orchidaceae
- Subfamily: Epidendroideae
- Genus: Epidendrum
- Species: E. umbelliferum

Binomial name
- Epidendrum umbelliferum J.F.Gmel.

Synonyms
- Epidendrum caribiorum Ackerman & Acev.-Rodr.; Epidendrum umbellatum Sw., nom. illeg.

= Epidendrum umbelliferum =

Umbrella epidendrum

Species of orchid

Epidendrum umbelliferum is a species of orchid, native to the Caribbean. It is known as the umbrella epidendrum.
