= Epidendrum juaicaense =

Scientific classification
- Kingdom: Plantae
- Clade: Embryophytes
- Clade: Tracheophytes
- Clade: Spermatophytes
- Clade: Angiosperms
- Clade: Monocots
- Order: Asparagales
- Family: Orchidaceae
- Subfamily: Epidendroideae
- Genus: Epidendrum
- Species: E. juaicaense

Binomial name
- Epidendrum juaicaense Hágsater, L.Pina & J.Duarte

Species of flowering plant

Epidendrum juaicaense is a species of orchid in the family Orchidaceae. It was first described from the Juaica region of Colombia, where it grows in montane habitats. The plant's status has been considered threatened, which has led to calls for conservation of both the plant and the larger Andean ecosystem.

== Description ==
It belongs to the large genus Epidendrum, which is widely distributed across the Americas. It is different from other species by its floral arrangement and vegetative attributes.
