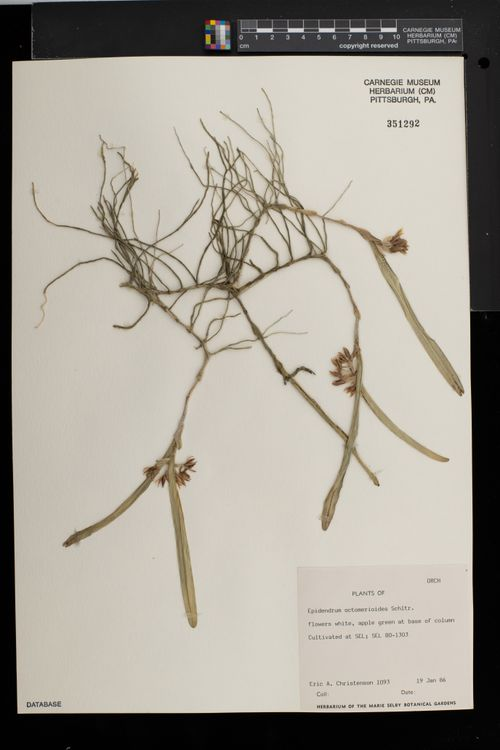

Scientific classification
- Kingdom: Plantae
- Clade: Tracheophytes
- Clade: Angiosperms
- Clade: Monocots
- Order: Asparagales
- Family: Orchidaceae
- Subfamily: Epidendroideae
- Genus: Epidendrum
- Species: E. octomerioides

Binomial name
- Epidendrum octomerioides Schltr.

= Epidendrum octomerioides =

Species of plant

Epidendrum octomerioides is an orchid in the genus Epidendrum ranging from Central America to NW. Colombia.

== Description ==
This species is an orchid with clustered white flowers, with four petals towards the top and a longer petal at the top a vanilla blossom like middle and a slightly off white twice indented bottom petal. the leaves are slender and green and have a trailing habit.

== Habitat ==
This species grows in trees in association to moss.
