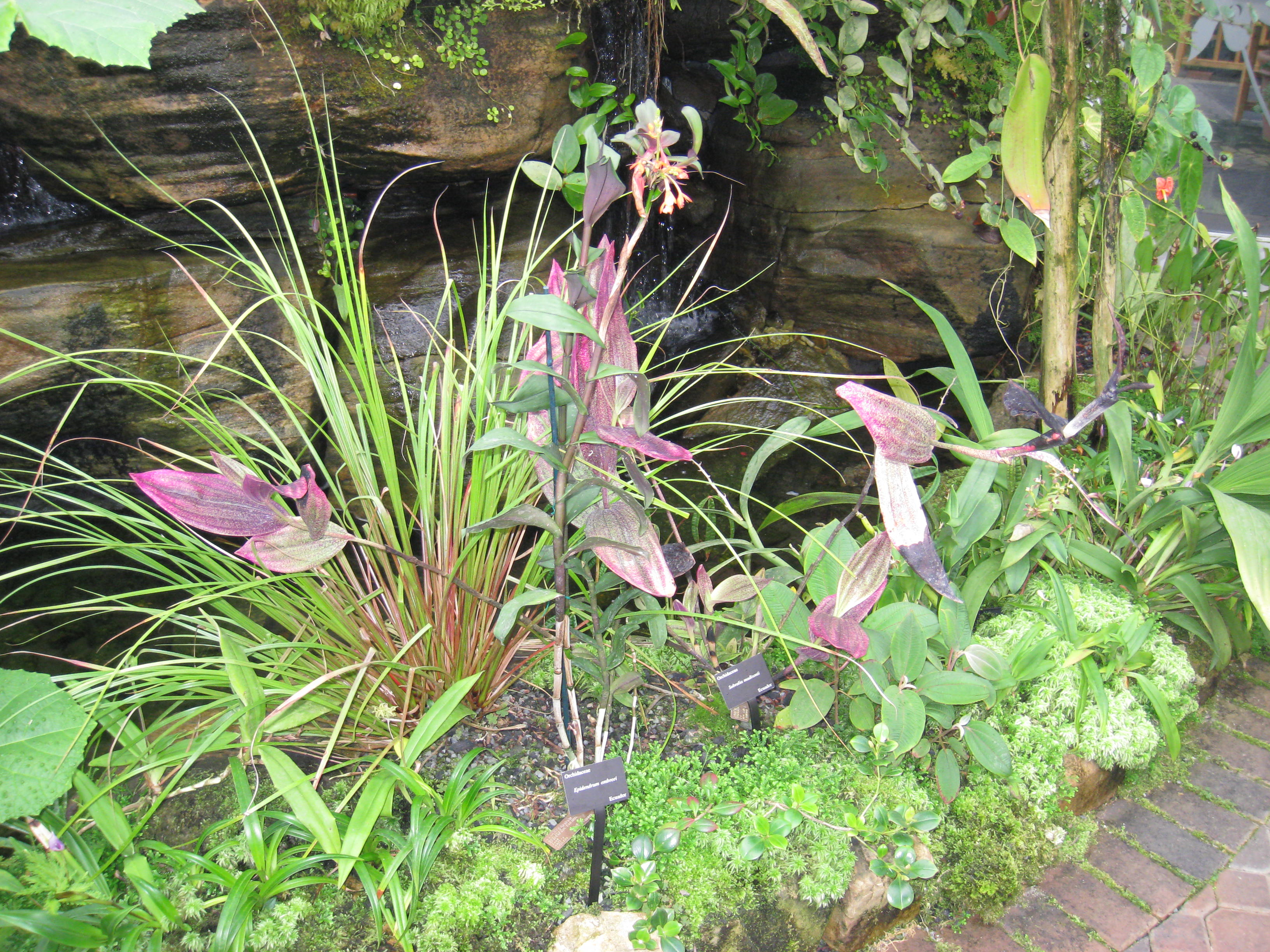
- At the Atlanta Botanical Garden

Scientific classification
- Kingdom: Plantae
- Clade: Tracheophytes
- Clade: Angiosperms
- Clade: Monocots
- Order: Asparagales
- Family: Orchidaceae
- Subfamily: Epidendroideae
- Genus: Epidendrum
- Species: E. spathatum

Binomial name
- Epidendrum spathatum Schltr.

Synonyms
- Epidendrum embreei Dodson

= Epidendrum spathatum =

Species of orchid

Epidendrum spathatum, synonym Epidendrum embreei, is a species of orchid in the genus Epidendrum.
