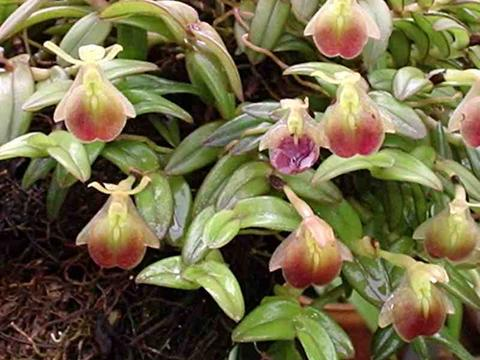

Scientific classification
- Kingdom: Plantae
- Clade: Tracheophytes
- Clade: Angiosperms
- Clade: Monocots
- Order: Asparagales
- Family: Orchidaceae
- Subfamily: Epidendroideae
- Genus: Epidendrum
- Subgenus: Epidendrum subg. Spathium
- Species: E. peperomia

Binomial name
- Epidendrum peperomia Rchb.f. (1854)

Synonyms
- Epidendrum porpax Rchb. f. (1855); Epidendrum lambeauanum De Wild. (1904); Epidendrum gnomus Schltr. (1921); Epidendrum porphyrophyllum Schltr. (1922); Nanodes porpax (Rchb. f.) Brieger (1960); Neolehmannia porpax (Rchb. f.) Garay & Dunst. (1976); Neolehmannia peperomia (Rchb. f.) Garay & Dunst. (1976)

= Epidendrum peperomia =

Peperomia-like epidendrum

Species of orchid

Epidendrum peperomia, the peperomia-like epidendrum, is a species of orchid in the genus Epidendrum.
