= Epidendrum minarum =

Scientific classification
- Kingdom: Plantae
- Clade: Tracheophytes
- Clade: Angiosperms
- Clade: Monocots
- Order: Asparagales
- Family: Orchidaceae
- Subfamily: Epidendroideae
- Tribe: Epidendreae
- Subtribe: Laeliinae
- Genus: Epidendrum
- Species: E. minarum

Binomial name
- Epidendrum minarum Hoehne & Schltr.

Species of orchid

Epidendrum minarum is a species of orchid of the genus Epidendrum. This is an epiphytic orchid occurring in Minas Gerais, Brazil.
