= Epidendrum chlorinum =

Scientific classification
- Kingdom: Plantae
- Clade: Tracheophytes
- Clade: Angiosperms
- Clade: Monocots
- Order: Asparagales
- Family: Orchidaceae
- Subfamily: Epidendroideae
- Tribe: Epidendreae
- Subtribe: Laeliinae
- Genus: Epidendrum
- Species: E. chlorinum

Binomial name
- Epidendrum chlorinum Barb.Rodr.

Synonyms
- E. chloranthum Barb.Rodr., nom. illeg.

Species of orchid

Epidendrum chlorinium is a terrestrial species of reed-stemmed Epidendrum found in mountainous regions of the states of Minas Gerais, São Paulo, and Espiritu Santo, Brazil, at altitudes of 1–1.5 km.

The terete stems grow as tall as 45 cm. The lower ~20 cm are covered with the thin, dry bases of old leaves. The dark green leaves grow to 12 cm long and 1.5 cm wide. The apical inflorescence grows up to 5 cm long, bearing 7 to 12 3-cm fragrant, translucent, lime-green flowers. The heart-shaped lip has two tiny white-green calli at its base. In its native habitat, it flowers from November until March.
