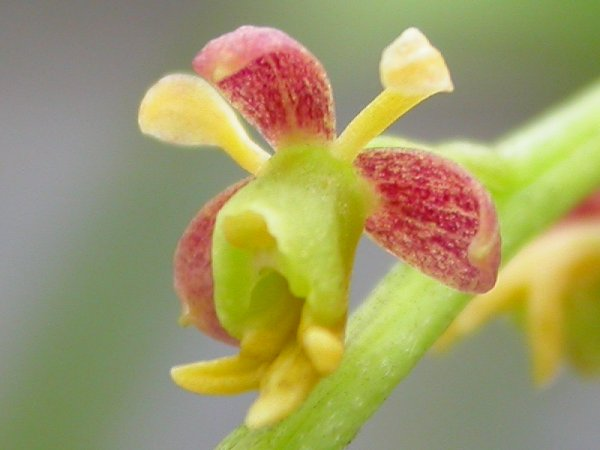

Scientific classification
- Kingdom: Plantae
- Clade: Embryophytes
- Clade: Tracheophytes
- Clade: Spermatophytes
- Clade: Angiosperms
- Clade: Monocots
- Order: Asparagales
- Family: Orchidaceae
- Subfamily: Epidendroideae
- Tribe: Epidendreae
- Subtribe: Laeliinae
- Genus: Epidendrum
- Species: E. tridactylum

Binomial name
- Epidendrum tridactylum Lindl.

Synonyms
- Amblostoma cernuum Scheidw.; Amblostoma densum Rchb.f.; Amblostoma densum Rchb.f.; Amblostoma dusenii Kraenzl.; Amblostoma tridactylum (Lindl.) Rchb.f. (homotypic synonym); Epidendrum amblostoma Rchb.f.; Epidendrum citrinum Barb.Rodr., nom. illeg.; Epidendrum tridactylum var. pallidum Knowles & Westc.

= Epidendrum tridactylum =

Species of plant

Epidendrum tridactylum is an epiphytic species of orchid of the genus Epidendrum, occurring in Ecuador, Peru, and Brazil
