= Epidendrum subumbellatum =

Scientific classification
- Kingdom: Plantae
- Clade: Tracheophytes
- Clade: Angiosperms
- Clade: Monocots
- Order: Asparagales
- Family: Orchidaceae
- Subfamily: Epidendroideae
- Genus: Epidendrum
- Species: E. subumbellatum

Binomial name
- Epidendrum subumbellatum Hoffmanns.

Synonyms
- Epidendrum panegyricum Hágsater & L.Sánchez; Epidendrum pseudodifforme Hoehne & Schltr. (1926), nom. illeg.

Species of plant

Epidendrum subumbellatum is a species of flowering plant in the family Orchidaceae, native from south Florida through Mexico and Central America to tropical South America. It was first described by Johann Centurius Hoffmannsegg in 1842.
