= Epidendrum verrucosum =

Scientific classification
- Kingdom: Plantae
- Clade: Tracheophytes
- Clade: Angiosperms
- Clade: Monocots
- Order: Asparagales
- Family: Orchidaceae
- Subfamily: Epidendroideae
- Genus: Epidendrum
- Subgenus: Epidendrum subg. Epidendrum
- Section: Epidendrum sect. Planifolia
- Subsection: Epidendrum subsect. Paniculata
- Species: E. verrucosum

Binomial name
- Epidendrum verrucosum Rchb.f. (1856)

Synonyms
- Amphiglottis verrucosa (Sw.) Acuña (1939); Oerstedella verrucosa (Sw.) Hágsater (1981); Oerstedella hansenii (C.D.Adams) Nir (2000)

Species of orchid

Epidendrum verrucosum is a species of Epidendrum orchid that was described by Schwartz in 1806. In 1861, Reichenbach placed it in subsection Euepidendrum Planifolia Paniculata of the genus Epidendrum.

== Homonymy ==
In 1844, Lindley published a description of a very different orchid, Encyclia adenocaula (Lex.) Schltr. (1918), under the name Epidendrum verrucosum, making Epidendrum verrucosum Lindl. (1844) an illegitimate name, and a synonym for Encyclia adenocaula.
