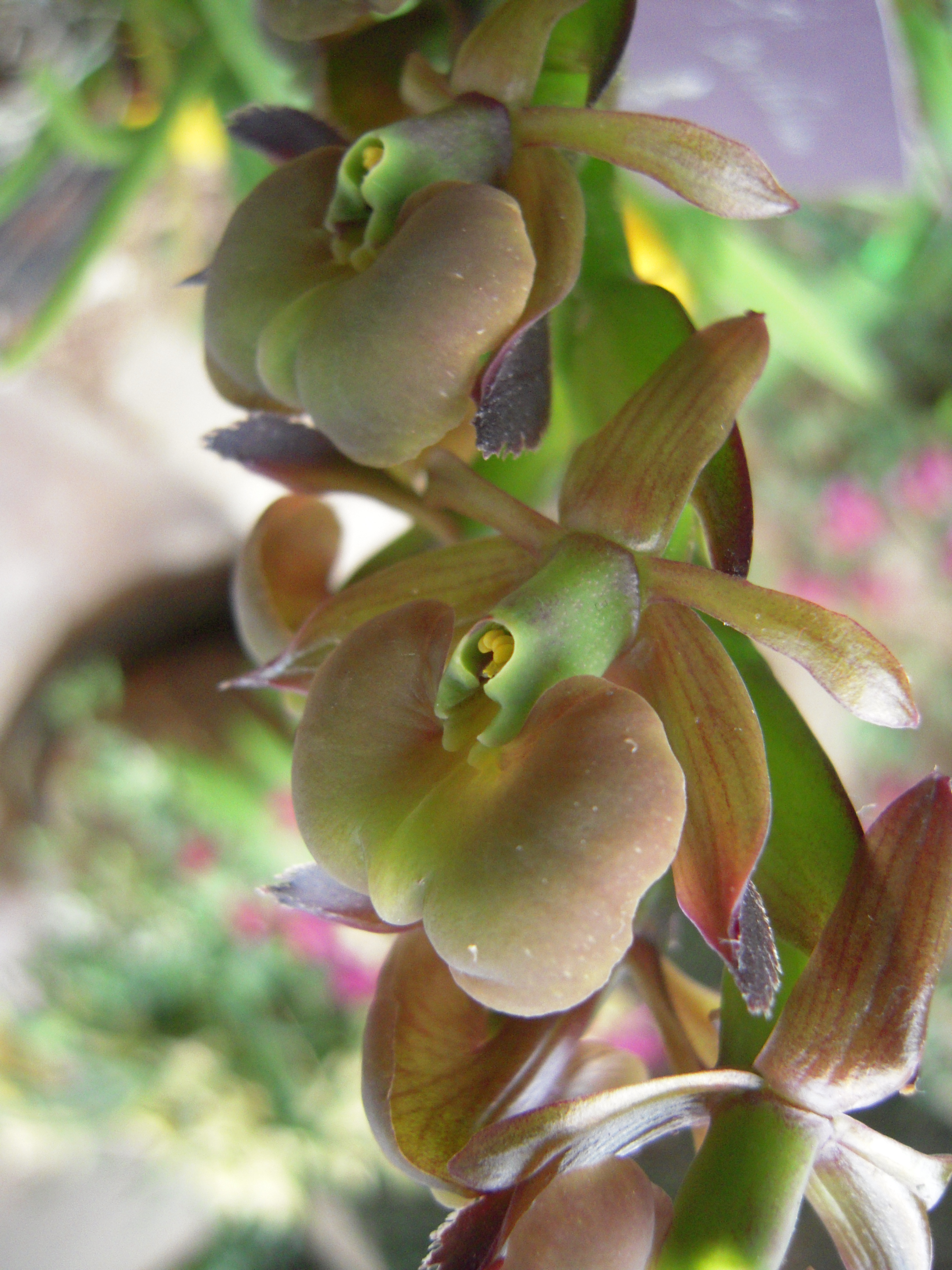

Scientific classification
- Kingdom: Plantae
- Clade: Tracheophytes
- Clade: Angiosperms
- Clade: Monocots
- Order: Asparagales
- Family: Orchidaceae
- Subfamily: Epidendroideae
- Genus: Epidendrum
- Subgenus: Epidendrum subg. Epidendrum
- Section: Epidendrum sect. Planifolia
- Subsection: Epidendrum subsect. Spathacea
- Species: E. coriifolium

Binomial name
- Epidendrum coriifolium Lindl.

Synonyms
- Epidendrum fuscopurpureum Schltr. Epidendrum subviolascens Schltr.

= Epidendrum coriifolium =

Species of orchid

Epidendrum coriifolium is a sympodial orchid which grows both terrestrially and epiphytically at altitudes of 1.4—1.7 km in dense forests in Brazil, Ecuador, Mexico, Central America, and Venezuela.

== Description ==
E. coriifolium impressed early taxonomists by being glazed over with a shining exudation. A member of E. subg. Epidendrum, this species has stems that do not swell into pseudobulbs, close imbricating sheathes covering the stems from the base to the last regular leaf, terminal inflorescences which emerge from the last regular leaf without being covered by any sheath or spathe, and a lip which is adnate to the column to its apex. The 2-5 distichous, leathery to fleshy leaves are concave and carinate, to 3 dm long by a half dm wide. The inflorescence, up to 3 dm. long, bears large, distichous, leathery foliar bracts that are longer than the ovaries. The fleshy flowers are variable in color — cream to green to purple-brown or mahogany, often showing purple nerves on the sepals and brownish blushes around the margins of the green lip. The 1–3 cm long sepals are lanceolate, the dorsal oblong or elliptic, the laterals obliquely ovate, broader than the dorsal, and bearing a toothed keel on the back. The linear petals are slightly shorter than the sepals. The cordate to reniform lip has an elevated callosity down the middle, which extends into a blunt apicule in the retuse end of the lip.

Lindley compared E. coriifolium to E. rigidum Jacq (1760) not Lodd. (1829), noting that E. coriifolium flowers are 3—4 times bigger, and the leaves are longer and narrower (reported in Reichenbach, 1861).

== Homonymy ==
Epidendrum allochronum Hágsater (1993) was originally described by Schlechter in 1922 as the variety purpurascens of Epidendrum coriifolium.
