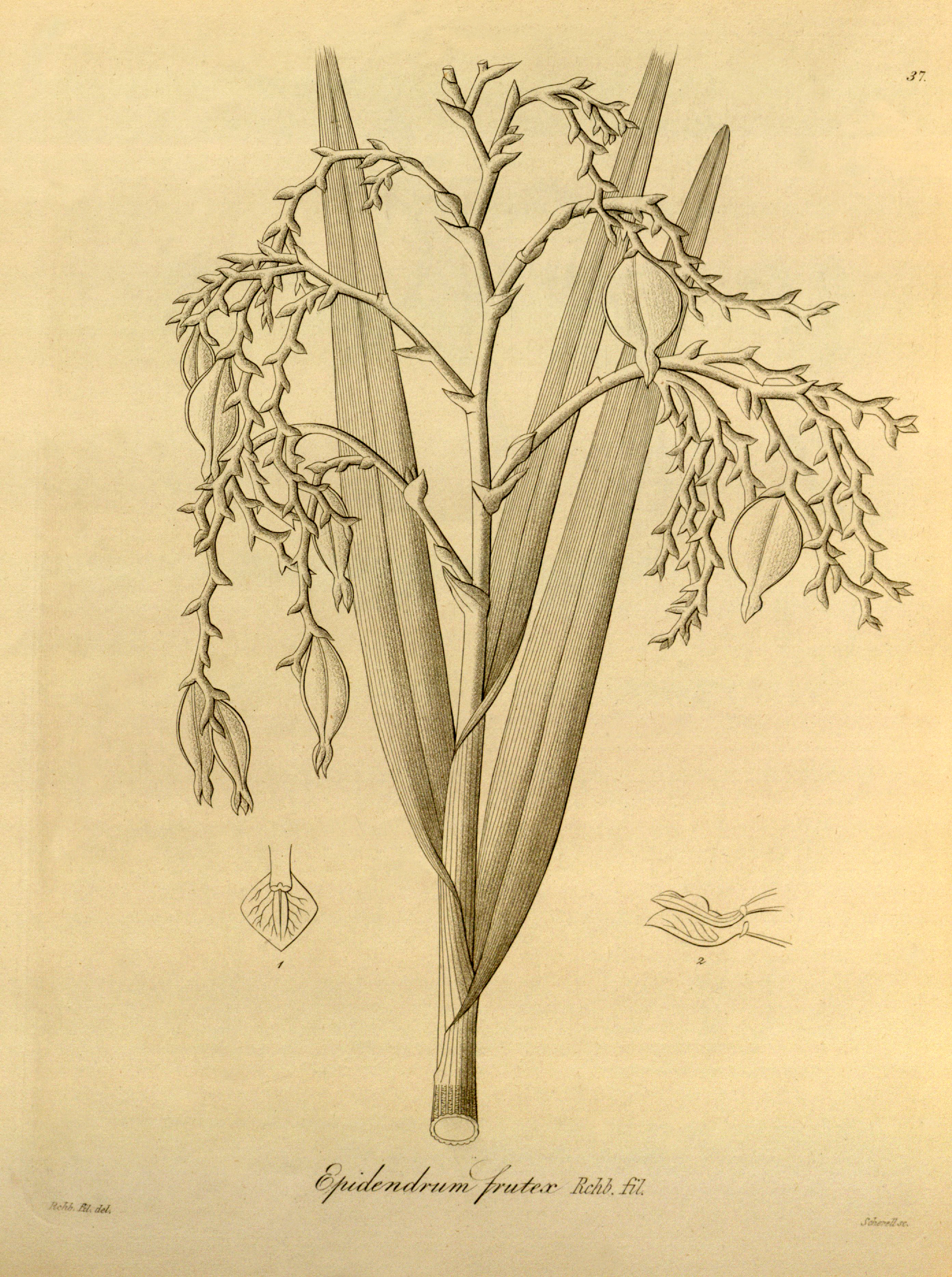

Scientific classification
- Kingdom: Plantae
- Clade: Tracheophytes
- Clade: Angiosperms
- Clade: Monocots
- Order: Asparagales
- Family: Orchidaceae
- Subfamily: Epidendroideae
- Genus: Epidendrum
- Subgenus: Epidendrum subg. Epidendrum
- Section: Epidendrum sect. Planifolia
- Subsection: Epidendrum subsect. Paniculata
- Species: E. frutex

Binomial name
- Epidendrum frutex Rchb.f. (1855)

= Epidendrum frutex =

Species of plant

Epidendrum frutex is a high-altitude species of reed-stemmed Epidendrum orchid native to Colombia, Ecuador, Peru, and Venezuela.

== Description ==
E. frutex Rchb.f. (1855) is closely related to E. frigidum Lind. (1855), growing terrestrially in "open sphagnum uplands". The tall sympodial plants grow from 3/4 to 5 m tall. As is typical of the subgenus E. subg. Epidendrum, the stems are covered from the base with distichous, tubular, leaf-bearing sheaths. The narrow leathery leaves of E. frutex can grow more than 2 dm long. The terminal inflorescence is a distichous (not secund) compound panicle bearing numerous small, fleshy yellow to green to brown flowers. The triangular sepals are no longer than 6 mm. The linear petals are slightly shorter than the sepals. The lip is adnate to the column to its apex, heart-shaped where it diverges from the column, broader than it is long, and not divided into lobes. A linear keel runs down the center of the lip.

This large Epidendrum is notable for producing seed capsules that are more than ten times the size of the flowers.

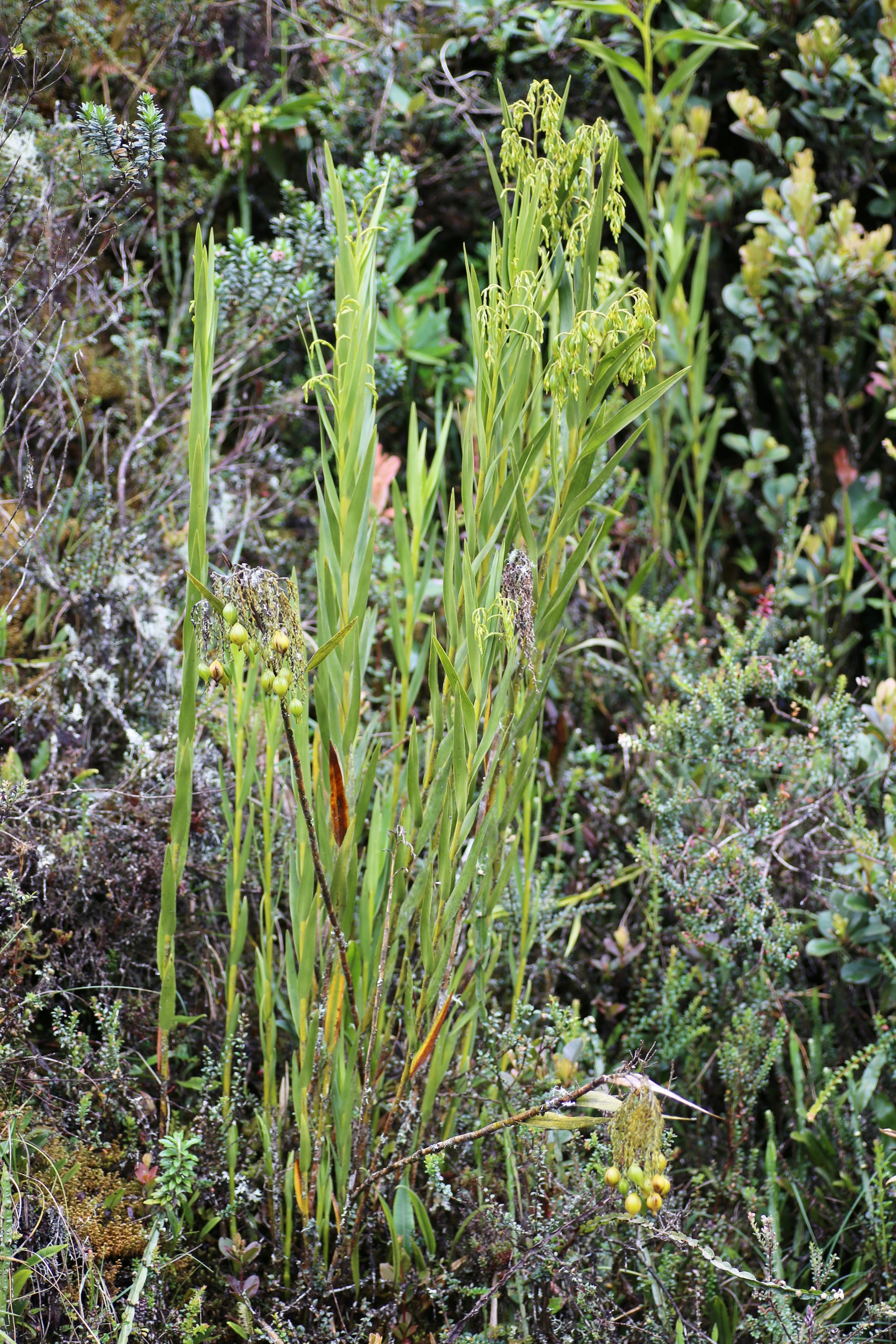
Epidendrum frutex — in habitat

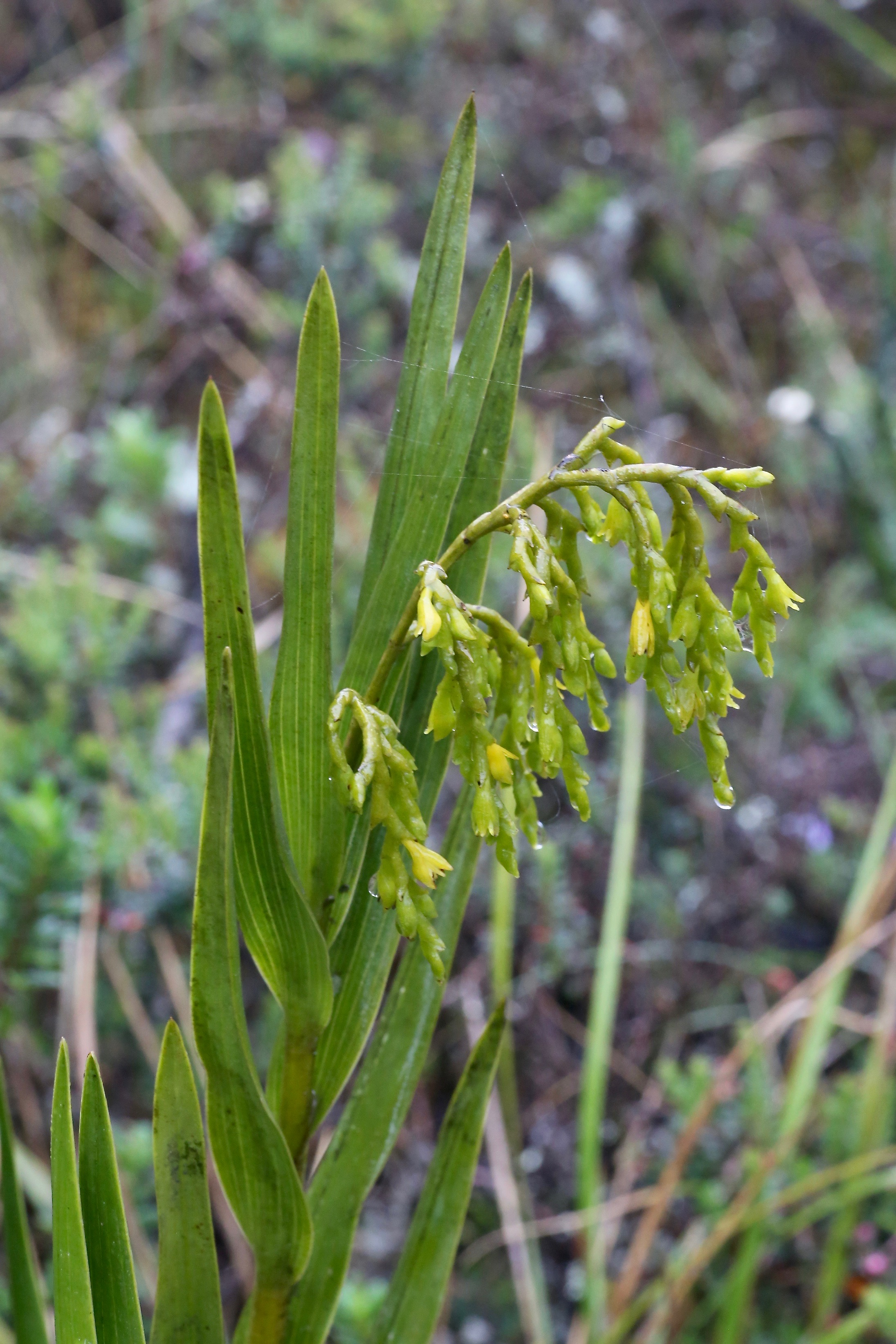
E. frutex — inflorescence

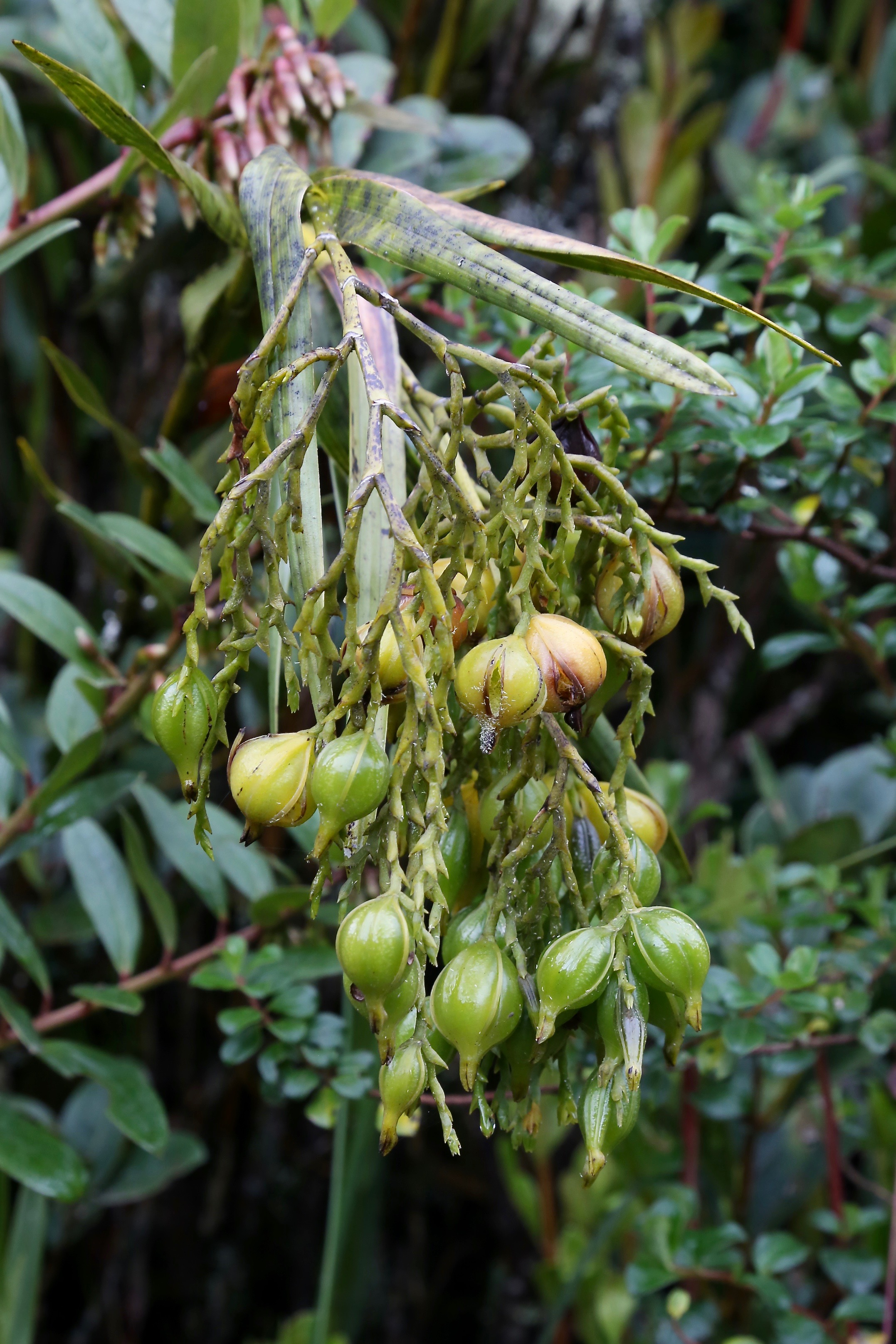
E. frutex — infruitescence
