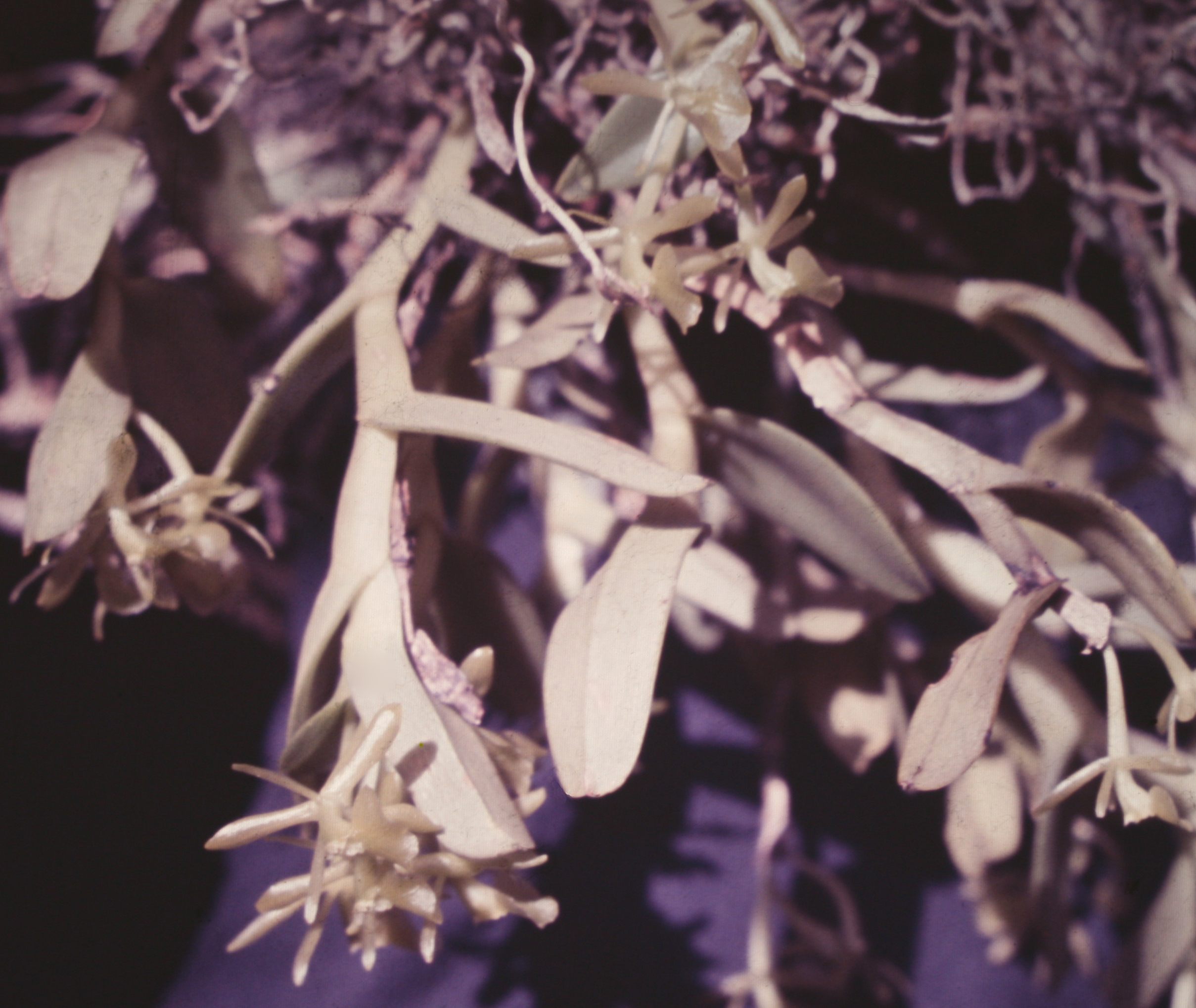

Scientific classification
- Kingdom: Plantae
- Clade: Tracheophytes
- Clade: Angiosperms
- Clade: Monocots
- Order: Asparagales
- Family: Orchidaceae
- Subfamily: Epidendroideae
- Genus: Epidendrum
- Subgenus: Epidendrum subg. Epidendrum
- Section: Epidendrum sect. Planifolia
- Subsection: Epidendrum subsect. Umbellata
- Species: E. difforme

Binomial name
- Epidendrum difforme Jacq. (1760)

Synonyms
- Epidendrum radiatum Hoffmanns. (1842); Epidendrum virens Hoffmanns. (1842); Epidendrum arachnoideum Barb.Rodr. (1877); Auliza difformis (Jacq.) Small (1913); Amphiglottis difformis (Jacq.) Britton (1924); Neolehmannia difformis (Jacq.) Pabst (1978)

= Epidendrum difforme =

Species of orchid

Epidendrum difforme (the "Differently Formed Epidendrum") is a species of orchid in the genus Epidendrum. In 1861, Müller classified this species in the subsection Umbellata of the section Planifolia of subgenus Euepidendrum Lindl. of the genus Epidendrum.

The diploid chromosome number of E. difforme has been determined both as 2n = 40 and as 2n = 39.
