= Epidendrum latilabre =

Scientific classification
- Kingdom: Plantae
- Clade: Tracheophytes
- Clade: Angiosperms
- Clade: Monocots
- Order: Asparagales
- Family: Orchidaceae
- Subfamily: Epidendroideae
- Genus: Epidendrum
- Subgenus: Epidendrum subg. Epidendrum
- Section: Epidendrum sect. Planifolia
- Subsection: Epidendrum subsect. Umbellata
- Species: E. latilabre

Binomial name
- Epidendrum latilabre Lindl., 1841

Species of plant

Epidendrum latilabre is a species of orchid of the genus Epidendrum which occurs naturally in French Guiana, Peru and Brazil. The diploid chromosome number of E. latilabre has been determined as 2n = 40.
