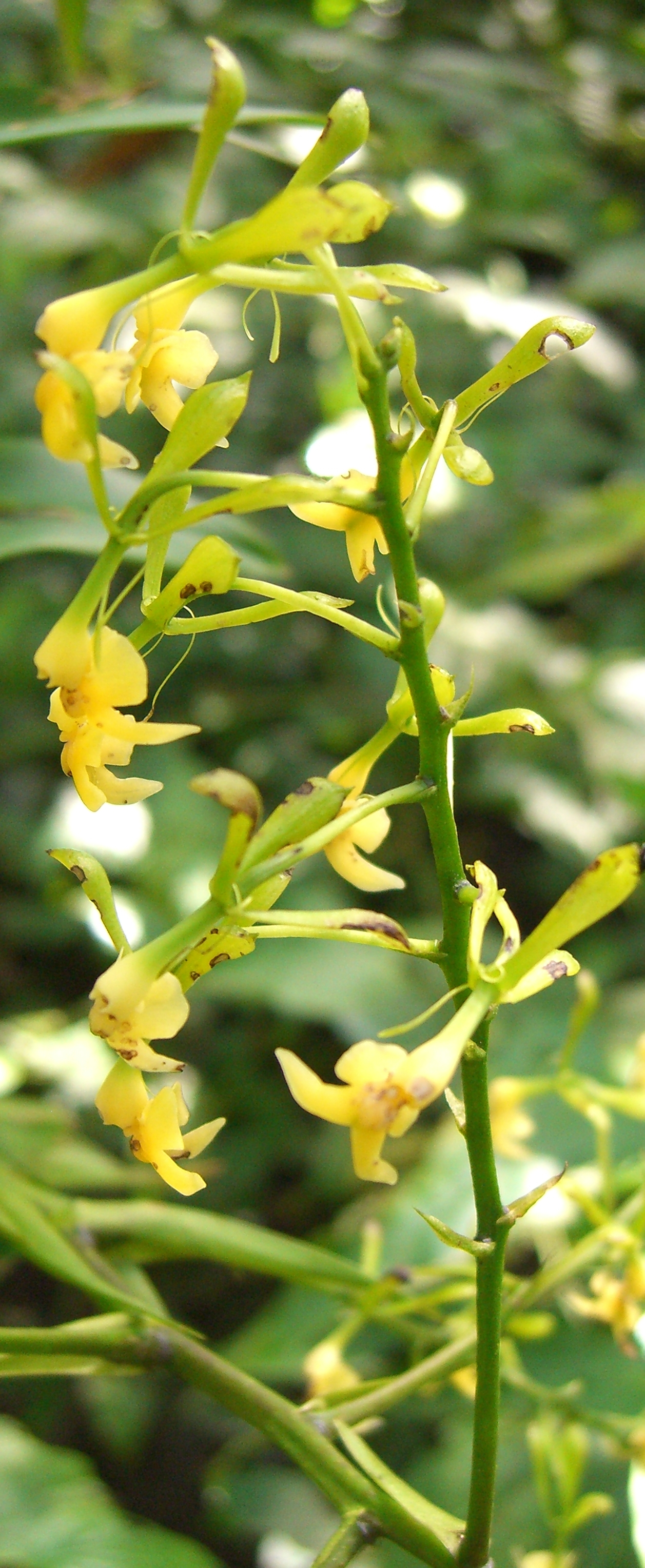

Scientific classification
- Kingdom: Plantae
- Clade: Tracheophytes
- Clade: Angiosperms
- Clade: Monocots
- Order: Asparagales
- Family: Orchidaceae
- Subfamily: Epidendroideae
- Genus: Epidendrum
- Subgenus: Epidendrum subg. Epidendrum
- Section: Epidendrum sect. Planifolia
- Subsection: Epidendrum subsect. Paniculata
- Species: E. paniculatum

Binomial name
- Epidendrum paniculatum Ruiz & Pav.

Synonyms
- Epidendrum brachythyrsus Kraenzl. (1911); Epidendrum cryptoglossum Pabst (1976; Epidendrum falsiloquum Rchb.f. (1885); Epidendrum fastigiatum Lindl. (1853) nom. illeg.; Epidendrum floribundum Kunth (1816); Epidendrum floribundum var. convexum Lindl. (1853); Epidendrum frons-bovis Kraenzl. (1905); Epidendrum laeve Lindl. (1844); Epidendrum ornatum Lem. (1848); Epidendrum paniculatum var. cuspidatum Lindl. (1853); Epidendrum paniculatum var. longicrure Lindl. (1853); Epidendrum reflexum Ames & C. Schweinf. (1925); Epidendrum syringiiflorum Rchb.f. & Warsz. (1854)

= Epidendrum paniculatum =

Species of orchid

Epidendrum paniculatum (gloss: paniculate upon a tree) is a species of orchid in the genus Epidendrum.

== Taxonomy ==
Reichenbach determined that E. fastigiatum Lindl. 1853, E. floribundum Kunth 1816, and E. paniculatum Ruiz & Pav. (1798), including E. cuspidatum Lindl. (1853), E. laevi Lindl. (1844), and E. longicrure Lindl. (1853) were three separate species. Because E. fastigiatum Lindl. 1853 and E. paniculatum Ruiz & Pav. (1798) had the lower part of the inflorescences covered in imbricate sheathes, Reichenbach placed them in the section Amphiglotium Polycladia. Because E. floribundum Kunth 1816 had no imbricate sheaths on the lower part of the inflorescence, Reichenbach placed it in the subsection Euepidendrum Planifolia Paniculata.

According to the World Checklist of Selected Plant Families published by Kew, E. fastigiatum Lindl. 1853 and E. floribundum Kunth 1816 are both synonyms for Epidendrum paniculatum Ruiz & Pav. (1798).

In 1984, the diploid chromosome number of an individual identified as E. floribundum Kunth was determined as 2n = 40.
