= Epidendrum piperinum =

Scientific classification
- Kingdom: Plantae
- Clade: Tracheophytes
- Clade: Angiosperms
- Clade: Monocots
- Order: Asparagales
- Family: Orchidaceae
- Subfamily: Epidendroideae
- Genus: Epidendrum
- Subgenus: Epidendrum subg. Epidendrum
- Section: Epidendrum sect. Planifolia
- Subsection: Epidendrum subsect. Umbellata
- Species: E. piperinum

Binomial name
- Epidendrum piperinum Lindl.

Species of plant

Epidendrum piperinum is a small succulent epiphytic orchid native to the tropical Cloud forest of Colombia, Ecuador (including Carchi and Pichincha), and Peru, at altitudes close to 3 km. Reichenbach noted that the plant resembled a Peperomia.

== Description ==
The branched reed-like stems of E. piperinum are covered from the base to apex with imbricating sheaths; on the upper stem, these sheaths terminate in alternate oblong succulent leaves. The very short peduncle is not covered by any sheath or spathe where it emerges from the apex of the stem, and terminates in one small green flower at a time. The 3 mm long filiform petals stand erect alongside the much broader (1 mm) acute-ended 5 mm long dorsal sepal. The keeled ovate-lanceolate lateral sepals diverge narrowly and grow partially under the thick, heart-shaped lip.
