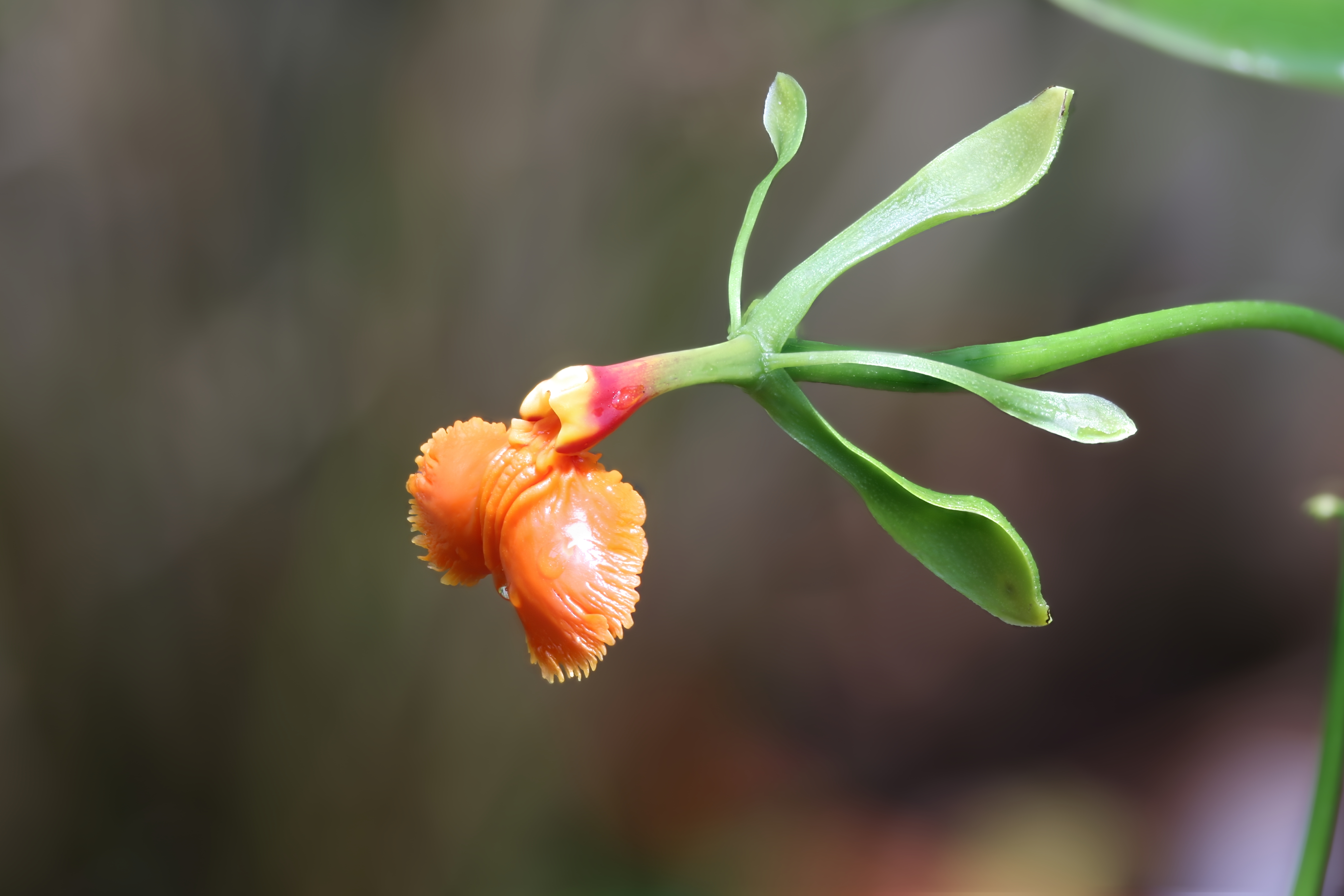

Scientific classification
- Kingdom: Plantae
- Clade: Tracheophytes
- Clade: Angiosperms
- Clade: Monocots
- Order: Asparagales
- Family: Orchidaceae
- Subfamily: Epidendroideae
- Genus: Epidendrum
- Subgenus: Epidendrum subg. Epidendrum
- Section: Epidendrum sect. Planifolia
- Subsection: Epidendrum subsect. Paniculata
- Species: E. pseudepidendrum

Binomial name
- Epidendrum pseudepidendrum Rchb.f. (1856)

Synonyms
- Pseudepidendrum spectabile Rchb.f. (1852)

= Epidendrum pseudepidendrum =

Species of orchid

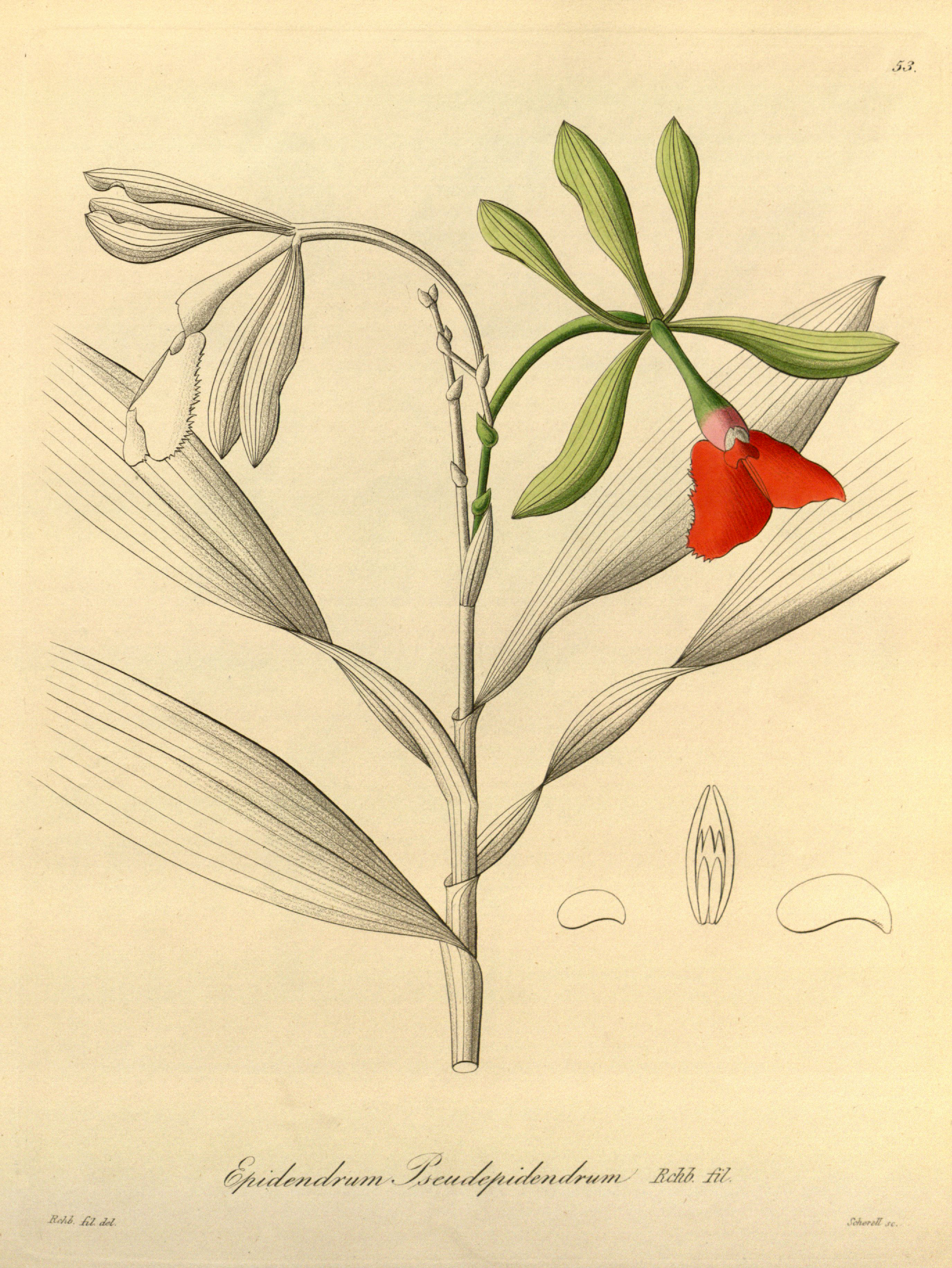
Botanical illustration of Epidendrum pseudepidendrum.

Epidendrum pseudepidendrum (the "False Epidendrum Epidendrum") is a species of orchid native to Costa Rica and Panama. The upright canes, which can reach 5 ft., bear paniculate inflorescences which can re-bloom for several years. According to Reichenbach, the strange name is the result of first being named Pseudepidendrum spectabile, before being moved to Epidendrum.

The species E. xanthoianthinum Hágsater (1993) was first described as a gold variety of this species, with the name E. pseudepidendrum var. auratum Rchb.f. (1885).

== Images ==
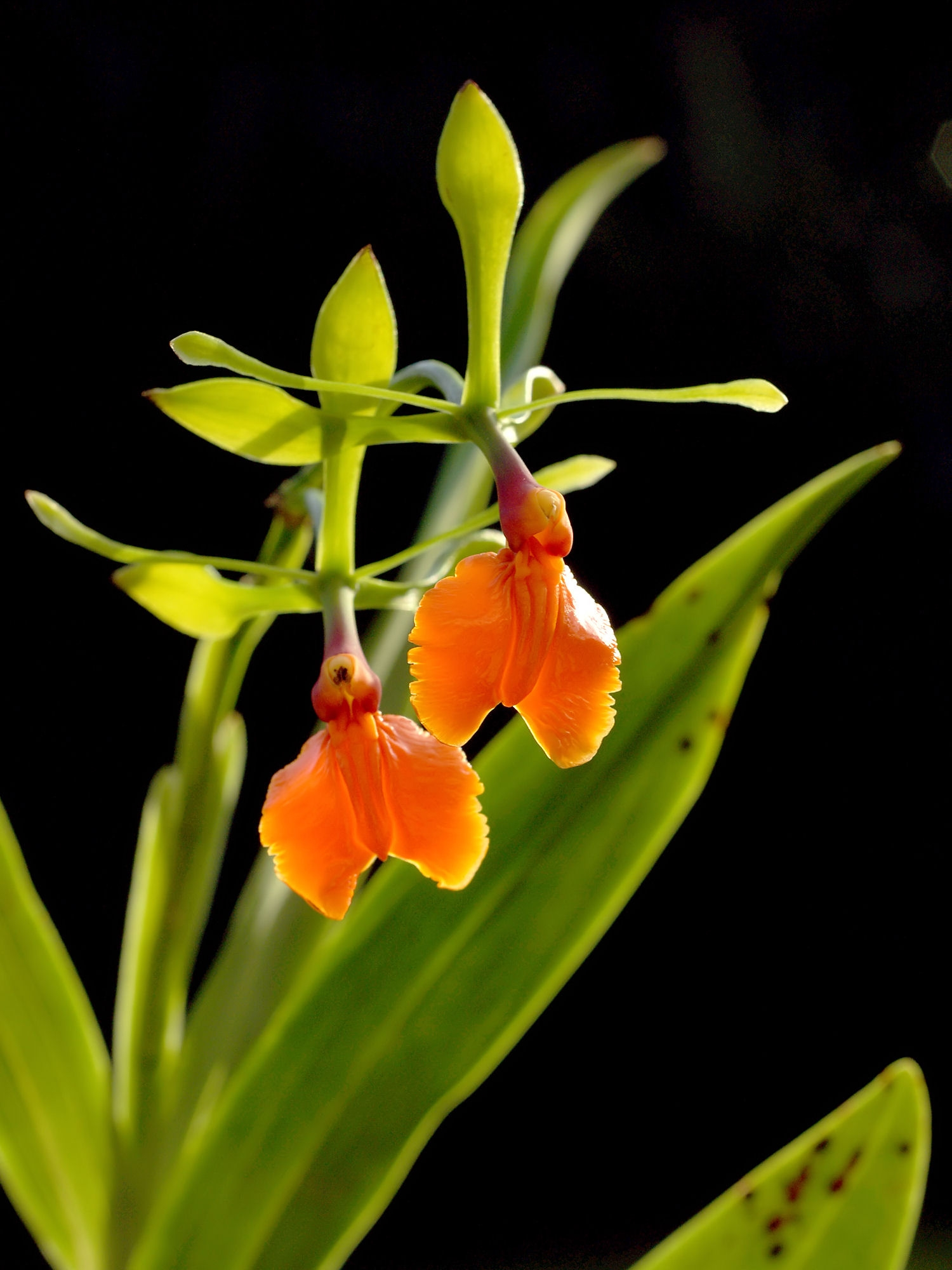

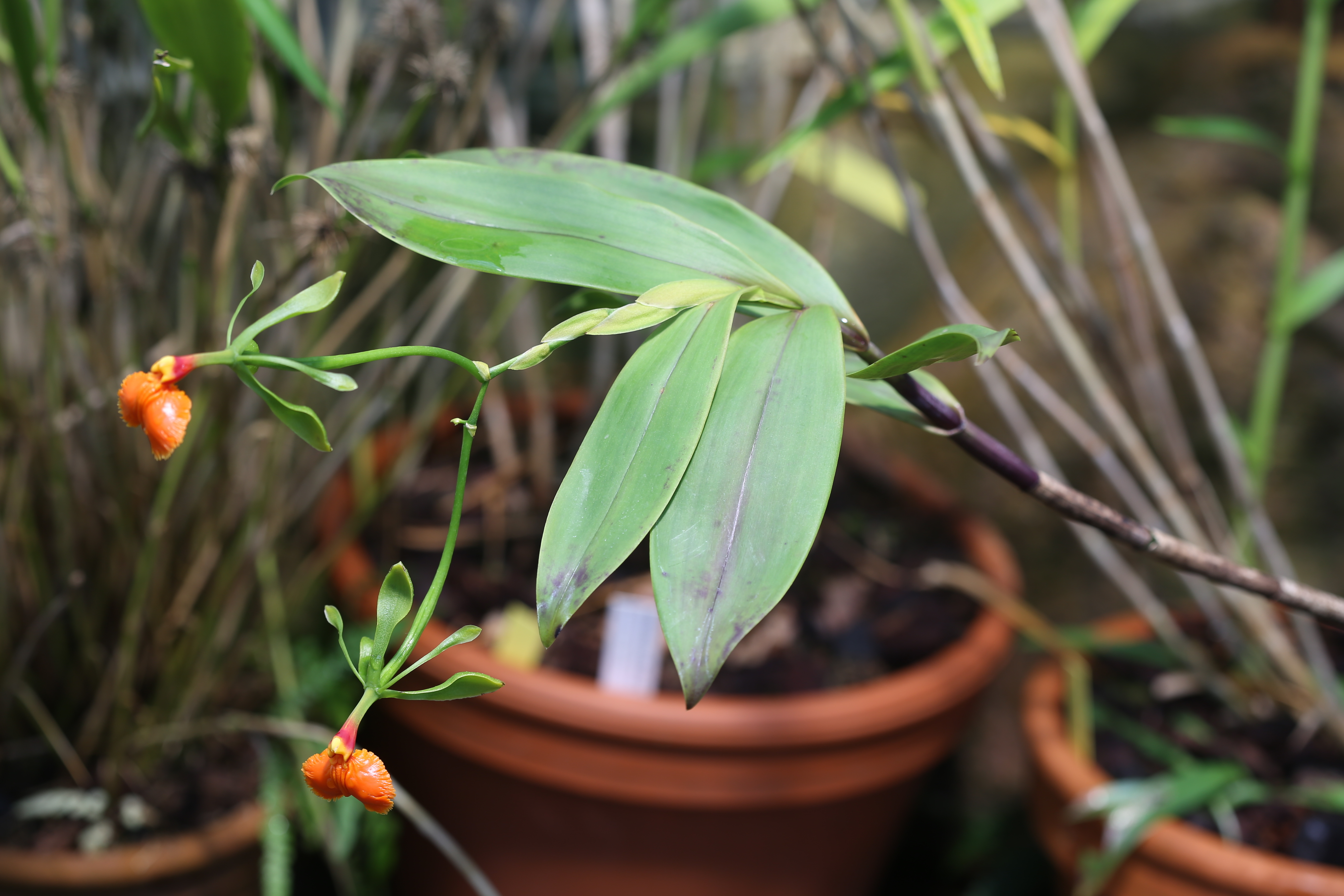

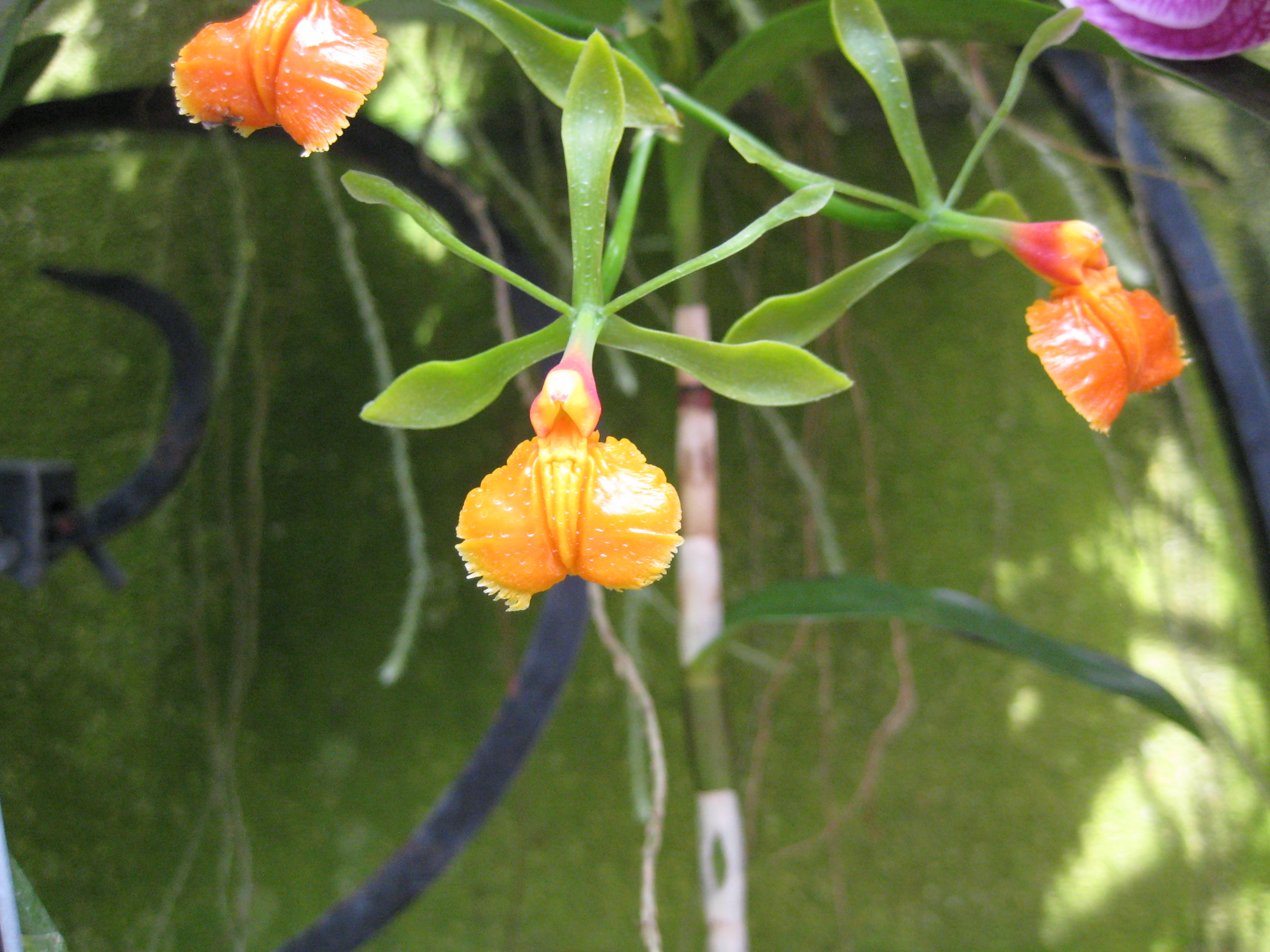

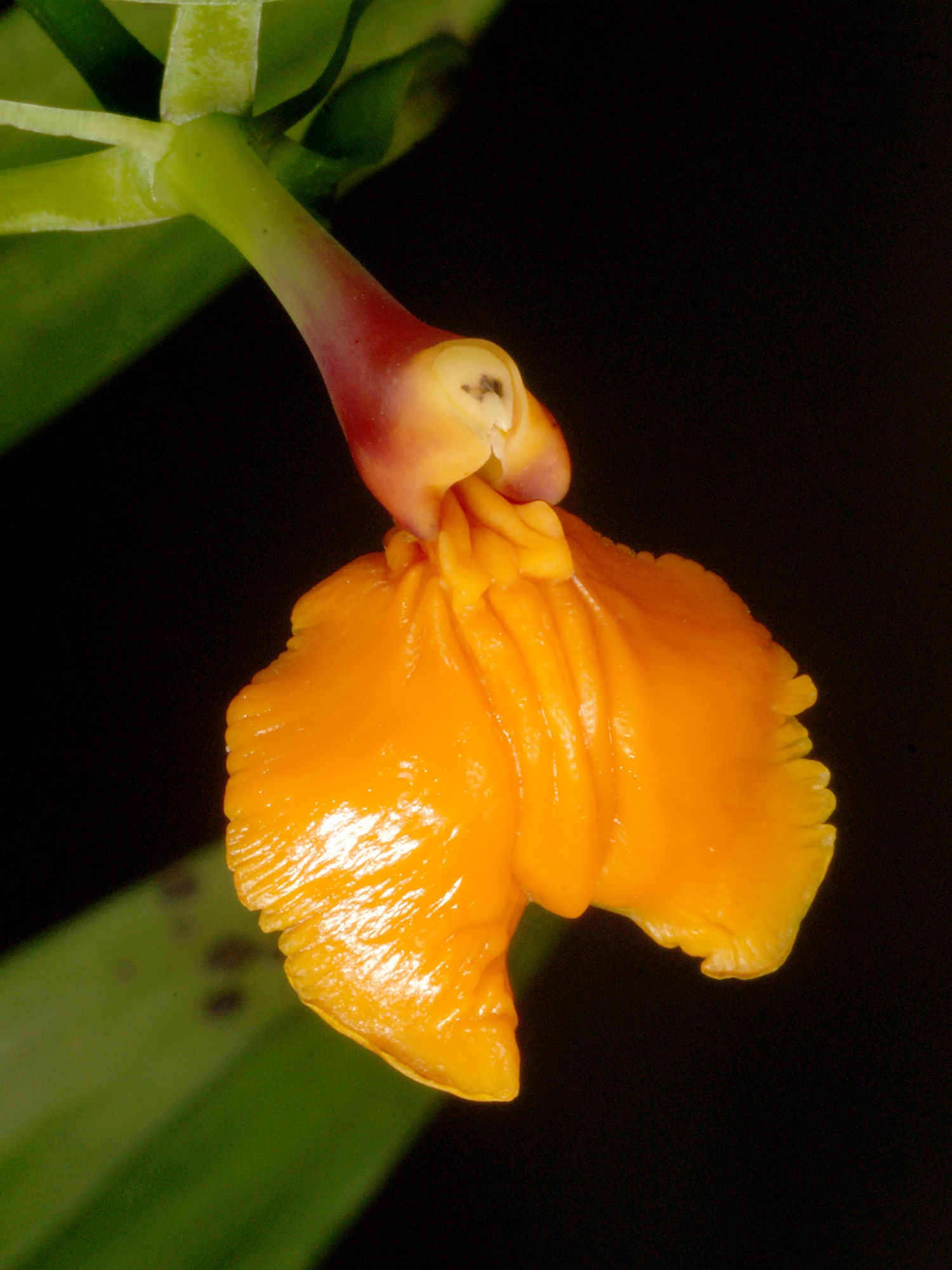

== References and external links ==
Media related to Epidendrum pseudepidendrum at Wikimedia Commons

- H. G. Reichenbach "ORCHIDES" in Dr. Carl Müller, Walpers Annales Botanices Systematicae 6(1861)414, Berlin.
