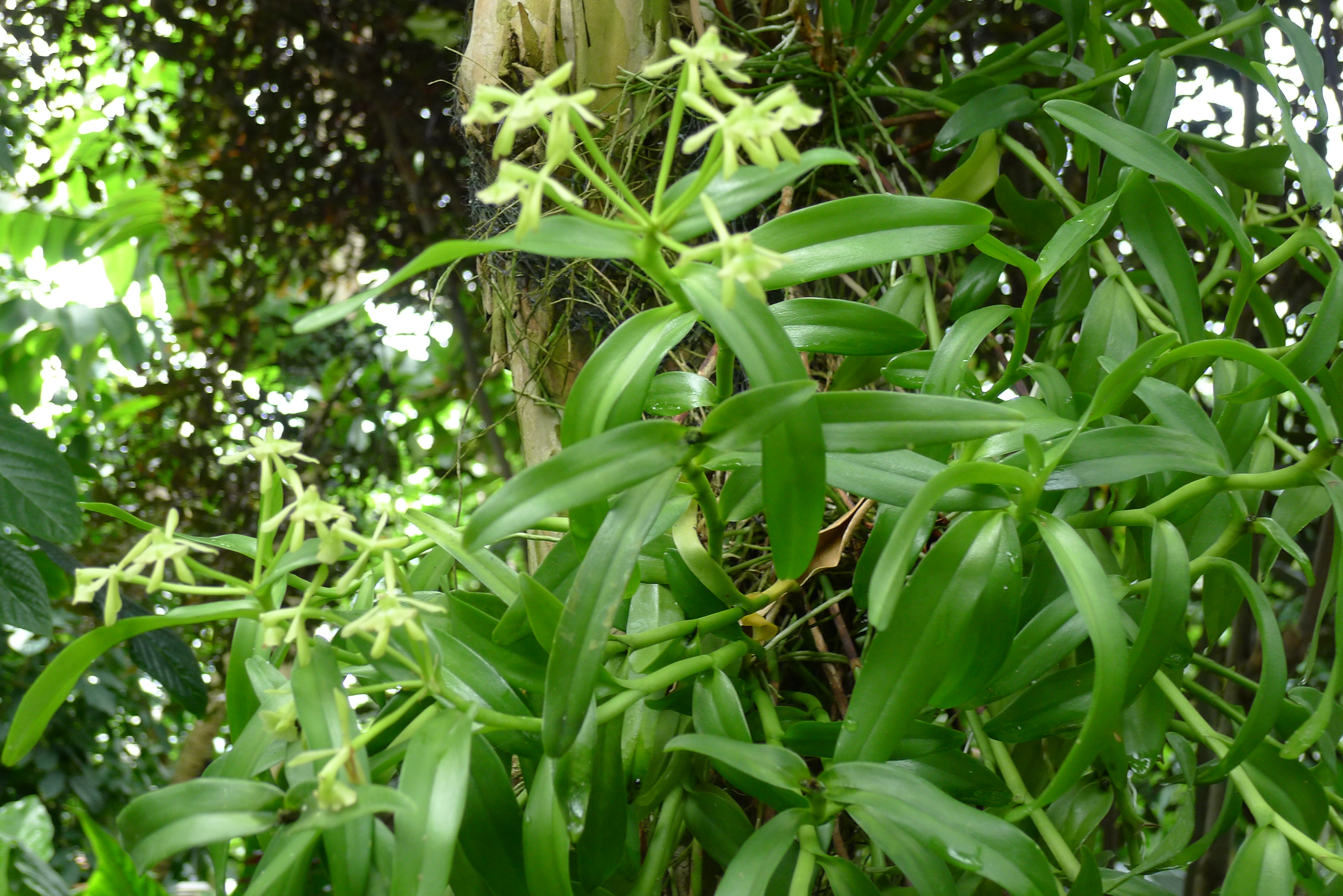

Scientific classification
- Kingdom: Plantae
- Clade: Tracheophytes
- Clade: Angiosperms
- Clade: Monocots
- Order: Asparagales
- Family: Orchidaceae
- Subfamily: Epidendroideae
- Genus: Epidendrum
- Subgenus: Epidendrum subg. Epidendrum
- Section: Epidendrum sect. Planifolia
- Subsection: Epidendrum subsect. Spathacea
- Species: E. rigidum

Binomial name
- Epidendrum rigidum Jacq.

Synonyms
- Epidendrum pium Rchb.f. & Warm. Epidendrum cardiophorum Schltr. Spathiger rigidus (Jacq.) Small

= Epidendrum rigidum =

Species of orchid

Epidendrum rigidum is an epiphytic reed-stemmed Epidendrum orchid common throughout the Neotropical lowlands, below 600 m (2,000 ft). (The Flora of North America recognizes a distinct species, E. cardiophorum Schltr., which replaces E. rigidum in Mexico and Central America; Kew lists E. cardiophorum Schltr. as a synonym for E. rigidum.)

== Description ==
E. rigidum has been placed in the subgenus E. subg Epidendrum Lindl. (1841) because its sympodial stems do not thicken to form pseudobulbs, its stems are covered by the basal sheaths of its distichous leaves, and its peduncle emerges from the apical leaf without being covered by any bract or sheath. The basal parts of the stems unite to form a creeping rhizome; the upper parts grow to 20 cm (7.9 in) long and can assume erect, horizontal, or hanging postures. The lathery ovate-oblong obtuse leaves are 3–8 cm (1.2–3.1 in) long and apically bilobed. As with other members of E. subsect. Spathacea Rchb.f. 1861, the racemose inflorescence bears enlarged spathaceous floral bracts. The green, non-resupinate, fleshy flowers are partially covered by the large, dolabriform bracts. The ovate obtuse sepals are 5 mm (0.20 in) long, with the lateral sepals larger than the dorsal sepal. The linear petals are also 5 mm (0.20 in) long. As with other members of the genus Epidendrum, the lip is adnate to the column to its apex. The lip is heart-shaped where it diverges from the column, ovate, and obtuse at the apex.

The diploid chromosome number of E. rigidum has been determined as 2n = 40.

== Homonymy ==
- Epidendrum rigidum Lodd. 1829 nom. illeg. is a synonym for E. ramosum Jacq. 1760
- Epidendrum rigidum var. angustisegmentum L.O.Williams 1946 is a synonym for E. angustisegmentum (L.O.Williams) Hágsater 1999
