= Epidendrum tridens =

Scientific classification
- Kingdom: Plantae
- Clade: Tracheophytes
- Clade: Angiosperms
- Clade: Monocots
- Order: Asparagales
- Family: Orchidaceae
- Subfamily: Epidendroideae
- Genus: Epidendrum
- Subsection: Epidendrum subsect. Umbellata
- Species: E. tridens

Binomial name
- Epidendrum tridens Poepp. & Endl.

Synonyms
- Epidendrum nocturnum var. latifolium Lindl. (1837); Epidendrum carpophorum Barb.Rodr. (1882); Epidendrum nocturnum var. tridens (Poepp. & Endl.) Cogn. (1898); Epidendrum tunguraguae Schltr. (1921); Epidendrum nocturna var. latifolia (Lindl.) Acuña (1938); Epidendrum latifolium (Lindl.) Garay & H.R.Sweet (1972); Epidendrum tridens var. briegeri Bock (1913); Epidendrum nocturnum var. tumuc-humaciense Veyret (1983); Epidendrum tumuc-humaciense (Veyret) Carnevali & G.A.Romero (1996)

Species of orchid

Epidendrum tridens ("the three-toothed Epidendrum") is a terrestrial orchid closely allied to E. nocturnum, of which it has often been considered a variety or synonym. For example, Reichenbach 1861 lists Epidendrum tridens (Poepp. & Endl.) Cogn. (1898) as a synonym of Epidendrum nocturnum and Epidendrum nocturnum var. latifolium Lindl. (1837) as a distinguishable variety of Epidendrum nocturnum.

== Description ==
Epidendrum tridens belongs to the subgenus E. subg. Epidendrum Lindl. (1842), and as such, displays a sympodial growth habit featuring reed-like stems covered by distichous tubular sheathes, leaf-bearing above, and produces an apical inflorescence which has neither sheath nor spathe at its base. The stems grow approximately 30 cm tall. The length of the leaves is less than twice the width (hence the varietal name "latifolia"), up to 12 cm long and 8 cm wide. The pedicellate ovary of the solitary flower is 6–10 cm long. The narrow pointed sepals and petals are lightly colored, described variously as white, yellow, and green, with a tinge of crimson, and approximately 7 cm long. The deeply trilobate lip is adnate to the column to its apex and bears a small yellow callus just past the column apex. The central lobe of the lip is linear-lanceolate, nearly 3 cm long by less than 3 mm wide. The lateral lobes of the lip, as illustrated by Dodson & Vásquez 1989, are roughly triangular, connected to the central lobe at one point. The IOSPE photo shows them as semi-ovate wings completely connected to the central lobe.

E. tridens is distributed widely in the Neotropics.
