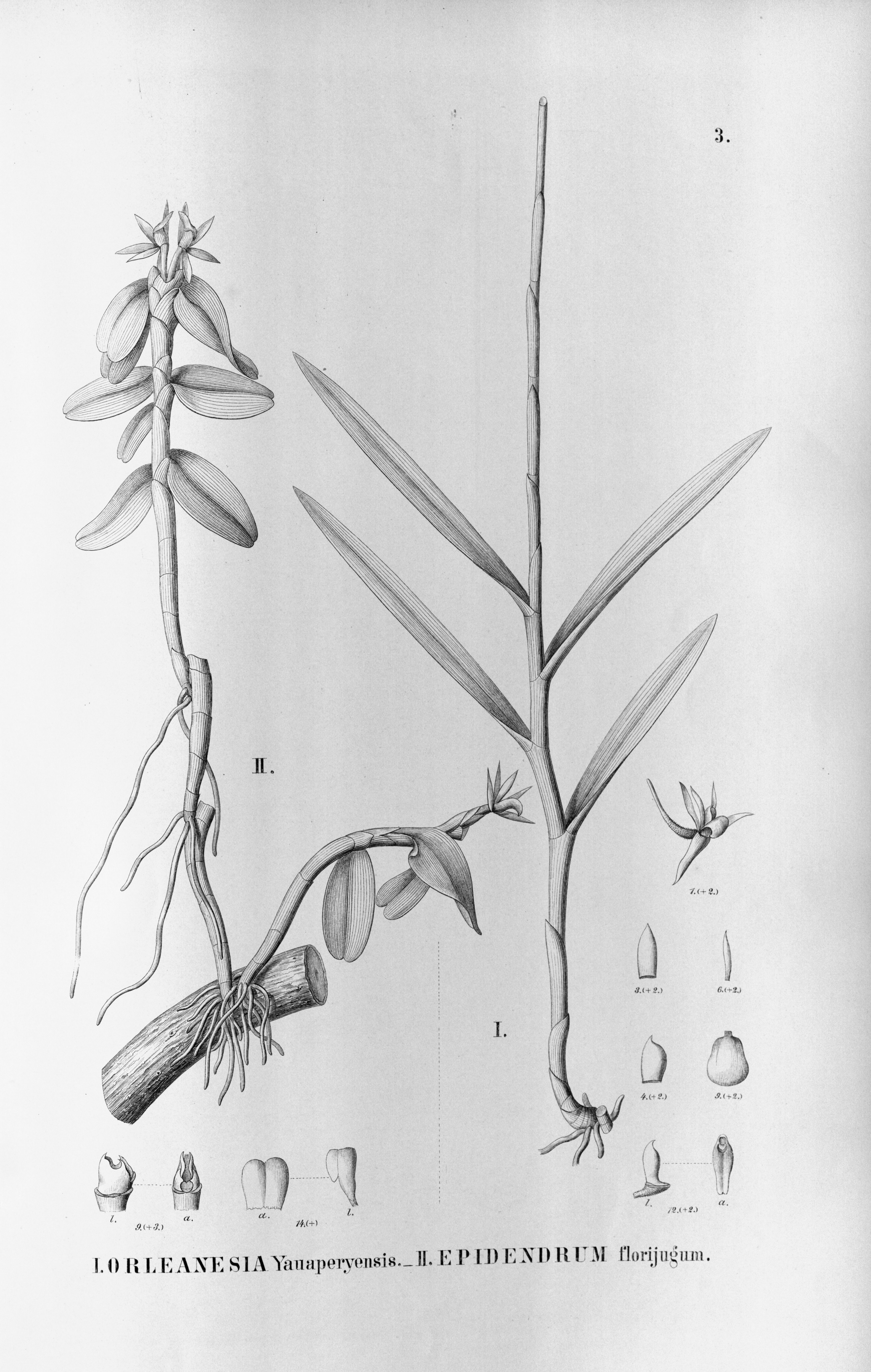
- Epidendrum sculptum as E. florijugum

Scientific classification
- Kingdom: Plantae
- Clade: Tracheophytes
- Clade: Angiosperms
- Clade: Monocots
- Order: Asparagales
- Family: Orchidaceae
- Subfamily: Epidendroideae
- Genus: Epidendrum
- Subgenus: Epidendrum subg. Epidendrum
- Section: Epidendrum sect. Planifolia
- Subsection: Epidendrum subsect. Umbellata
- Species: E. sculptum

Binomial name
- Epidendrum sculptum Rchb.f.

Synonyms
- Epidendrum florijugum Barb.Rodr.; Epidendrum colonense Ames

= Epidendrum sculptum =

Species of orchid

Epidendrum sculptum is a sympodial, epiphytic reed-stemmed orchid native to the Neotropics from Chiapas Mexico to Brazil, at altitudes ranging from near sea level to 0.5 km.

== Description ==
Epidendrum sculptum has hanging cane-like stems, covered in imbricating sheaths. On the part of the stem away from the roots, these sheaths bear alternate, oblong leaves, up to 5 cm long, which are two-lobed at the distal end. The inflorescence is so short that the three flowers appear to be sessile on the apex of the stem. According to Dodson & Dodson, 1989, the non-resupinate flowers are "surrounded at the base by 2, enlarged sheaths." Nevertheless, Reichenbach, who published the original description of the species, placed it in the subgenus "Epidendrum" (now spelled E. subg. Epidendrum), stating that the peduncle emerges from the apex of the stem without any covering sheath or spathe. The small (1 cm long) almost cartilage-like light green flowers open only partially. The sepals are narrowly ovate, the petals narrowly elliptical. The carnose trilobate lip is united to the column to its apex, and bears a keel down the middle from the apex of the column to the midpoint of the lip. The sides of the lip curl upward.
