= Epidendrum lanipes =

Scientific classification
- Kingdom: Plantae
- Clade: Tracheophytes
- Clade: Angiosperms
- Clade: Monocots
- Order: Asparagales
- Family: Orchidaceae
- Subfamily: Epidendroideae
- Genus: Epidendrum
- Subgenus: Epidendrum subg. Epidendrum
- Section: Epidendrum sect. Planifolia
- Subsection: Epidendrum subsect. Paniculata
- Species: E. lanipes

Binomial name
- Epidendrum lanipes Lindl. (1853)

Species of plant

Epidendrum lanipes is an epiphytic sympodial orchid with spindle-shaped stems native to the montane tropical rainforest of Bolivia, Colombia, Ecuador, and Peru at altitudes ranging from 0.8 to 1.4 km.

== Description ==
E. lanipes has been placed in E. subg. Epidendrum because of its rather slender, multifoliate, only slightly swollen stems, and because the terminal inflorescence has neither sheath nor spathe at its base. The flat leaves are variable: sword-shaped, tongue-shaped, narrowly elliptical, or oblong-lanceolate; they may or not be noticeably bilobed at the end. The 20 cm long paniculate inflorescence bears relatively widely separated branches, each a densely flowered 10 cm raceme. The white flower has a wooly ovary, linear-oblong sepals, slightly longer mucronate lateral sepals, filiform to linear-oblanceolate petals, and a citrus-like scent. The strongly trilobate lip is adnate to the column to its apex. The lateral lobes are semi-ovate and acute, the central lobe is contracted in the middle, with three rounded points at the end. The callus is also trilobate.

The diploid chromosome number of E. lanipes has been determined as 2n = 40.
