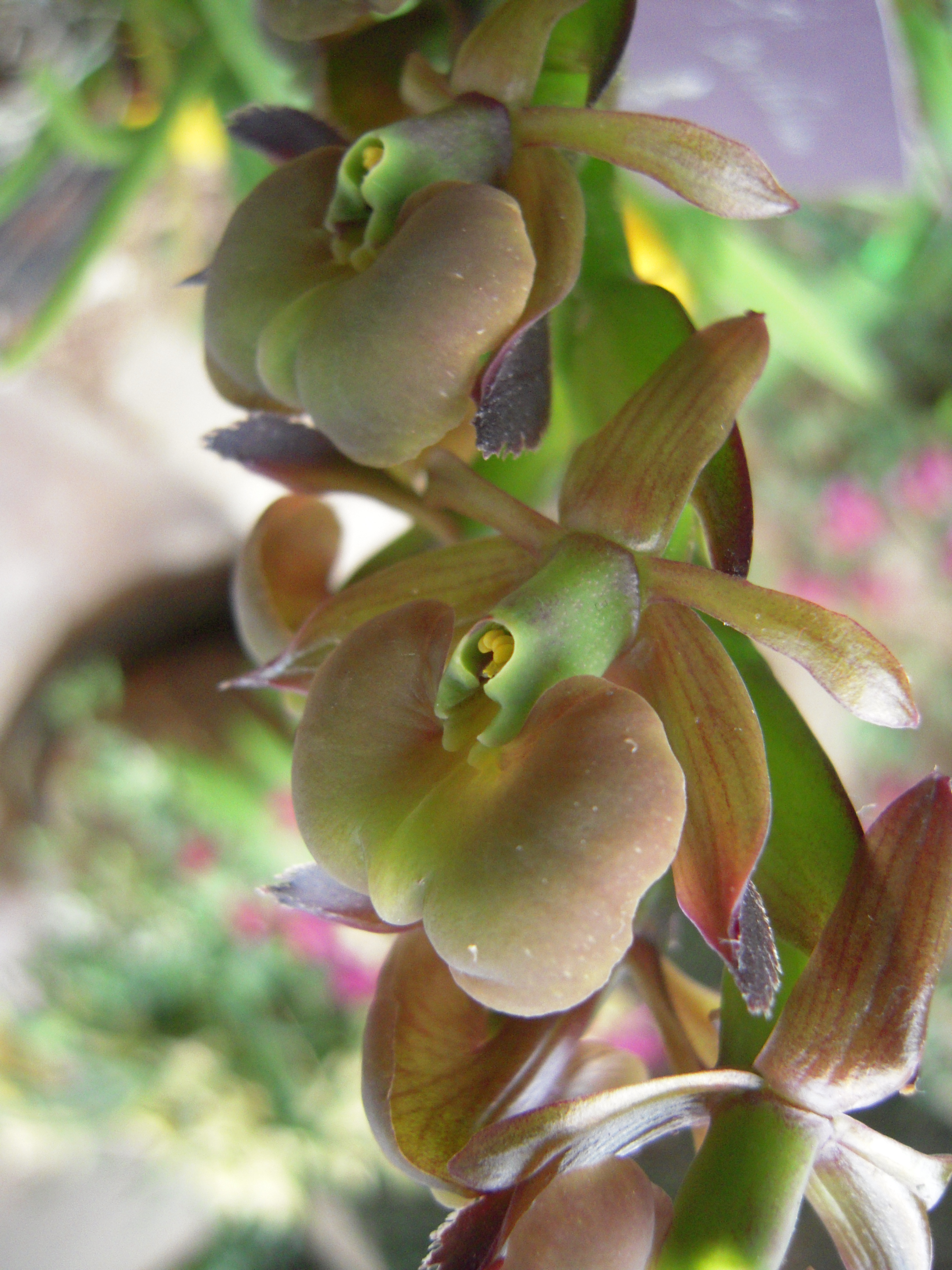
- Epidendrum coriifolium

Scientific classification
- Kingdom: Plantae
- Clade: Tracheophytes
- Clade: Angiosperms
- Clade: Monocots
- Order: Asparagales
- Family: Orchidaceae
- Subfamily: Epidendroideae
- Genus: Epidendrum
- Subgenus: Epidendrum subg. Epidendrum
- Section: Epidendrum sect. Planifolia
- Subsection: Epidendrum subsect. Spathacea; Rchb.f.

= Epidendrum subsect. Spathacea =

Group of orchids

Epidendrum subsect. Spathacea Rchb.f. is a subsection of the section E. sect. Planifolia Rchb.f. 1861 of the subgenus E. subg. Epidendrum Lindl. 1841 of the genus Epidendrum Lindl. of the Orchidaceae. Like the other subsections of E. sect. Planifolia, the species of E. subsect. Spathacea are characterized by a sympodial growth habit without pseudobulbs, a lack of any spathes or sheathes covering the base of the racemose inflorescence, and by flat (not round) leaves. The species categorized in Spathacea differ from the members of the other subsections by having large floral bracts, which make the inflorescence resemble a strobilus. Reichenbach originally placed eight species in this subsection (page numbers refer to Reichenbach 1861):

- E. bifarium Sw.(1799) on page 401
- E. bangii Rolfe(1907) on page 401 as E. macrostachyum Lindl. (1845) nom. illeg.
- E. coriifolium Lindl.(1851) on page 400
- E. paranaense Barb.Rodr.(1882) on page 401 as E. imbricatum Lindl.(1831) nom. illeg.
- E. ramosum Jacq. (1760) on page 399
- E. rigidum Jacq.( 1760) on page 400
- E. strobiliferum Rchb.f.(1859) on pages 399-400
- E. xylostachyum Lindl.(1845) on page 400
