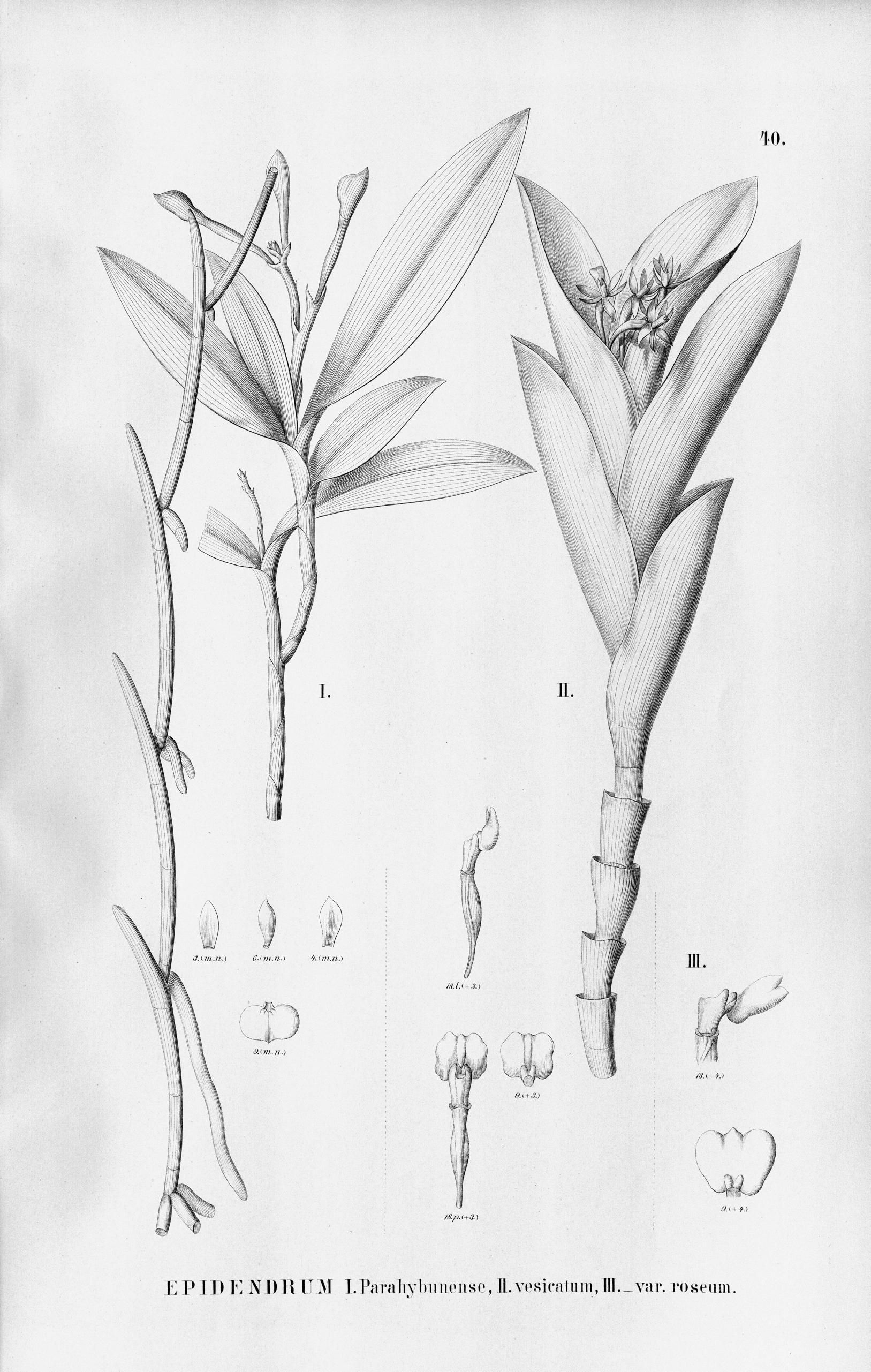
- I Epidendrum parahybunense, II E. vesicatum, III E. vesicatum

Scientific classification
- Kingdom: Plantae
- Clade: Tracheophytes
- Clade: Angiosperms
- Clade: Monocots
- Order: Asparagales
- Family: Orchidaceae
- Subfamily: Epidendroideae
- Genus: Epidendrum
- Subgenus: Epidendrum subg. Epidendrum
- Section: Epidendrum sect. Equitantia
- Species: E. vesicatum

Binomial name
- Epidendrum vesicatum Lindl., 1838

= Epidendrum vesicatum =

Species of orchid

Epidendrum vesicatum is an epiphytic species of orchid of the genus Epidendrum, occurring in Brazil.
