= Epidendrum subsect. Paniculata =

Scientific classification
- Kingdom: Plantae
- Clade: Tracheophytes
- Clade: Angiosperms
- Clade: Monocots
- Order: Asparagales
- Family: Orchidaceae
- Subfamily: Epidendroideae
- Subtribe: Laeliinae
- Genus: Epidendrum

Group of orchids

Epidendrum subsect. Paniculata Rchb.f. 1861 is a subsection of section E. sect. Planifolia of subgenus E. subgen. Epidendrum of the genus Epidendrum of the Orchidaceae (orchid family). Plants of E. subsect. Paniculata differ from the other subsections of E. sect. Planifolia by producing paniculate inflorescences. In 1861, Reichenbach recognized eighteen species in this subsection. From this group, Kew recognizes seventeen species (Page numbers are from Reichenbach):

- E. agathosmicum Rchb.f. (1850) (p. 413)
- E. aquaticum Lindl. (1843) (p. 411)
- E. dendrobioides Thunb. (1818) as E. durum Lindl. (1841) (p. 412) and E. carnosumLindl. (1842) (p. 412)
- E. densiflorum Hook. (1840) as E. floribundum var lilacinum Lindl. (1853) (p. 413)
- E. diffusum Sw. (p. 410)
- E. ferrugineum Ruiz & Pav. (1798) as E. naucrates Rchb.f. (1854) (pp. 412–413)
- E. frigidum Linden ex Lindl. (1845) (p. 411)
- E. frutex Rchb.f. (1855) (pp. 411–412)
- E. lanipes Lindl. (1853) (p. 413)
- E. paniculatum Ruiz & Pav. (1798) as E. floribundumHumb. & Kunth (1816) (pp. 413–414)
- E. parviflorum Ruiz & Pav. (1798) as E. gramineum Lindl. (1831) (p. 410)
- E. pseudepidendrum (p. 414) Rchb.f.(1856) (p. 414)
- E. purum Lindl. (1844)(p. 412)
- E. recurvatum Lindl. (1845) (p, 410)
- E. subpurum Rchb.f. (p. 413)
- E. verrucosum Sw. (1806) (p. 414)
- E. vincentinum Lindl. (1841)(p. 411)

Additionally, E. pseudepidendrum var. auratum Rchb.f. (1885) has been raised to a species as E. xanthoianthinum Hagsater(1993).
