= Epidendrum frigidum =

Scientific classification
- Kingdom: Plantae
- Clade: Tracheophytes
- Clade: Angiosperms
- Clade: Monocots
- Order: Asparagales
- Family: Orchidaceae
- Subfamily: Epidendroideae
- Genus: Epidendrum
- Subgenus: Epidendrum subg. Epidendrum
- Section: Epidendrum sect. Planifolia
- Subsection: Epidendrum subsect. Paniculata
- Species: E. frigidum

Binomial name
- Epidendrum frigidum Linden ex Lindl.

Synonyms
- Epidendrum macrodonax Schltr.

Species of orchid

Epidendrum frigidum is a reed-stemmed Epidendrum orchid from the high-altitude tropics in Bolivia, Colombia, Ecuador, Peru, and Venezuela.

== Description ==
Epidendrum frigidum is notable for inhabiting the high altitude tropical cloud forest (3–4 km high) near the tree line, sometimes on trees and sometimes terrestrially "on damp rocks a short distance from eternal snow." The round stem grows from a half to a meter tall. Like other members of Epidendrum subgenus Euepidendrum Lindl., the stem is covered by foliaceous sheathes of the distichous leaves. The leathery leaves are ovate-oblong, obtuse at the end, and curve backward at the edges. The erect paniculate inflorescence with drooping branches arises from the apex of the stem, without any spathe at the base. The flowers are pale rose or green. The rigid sepals and petals do not open widely, but surround the cordate lip which is adnate to the column to its apex and has an entire margin.
