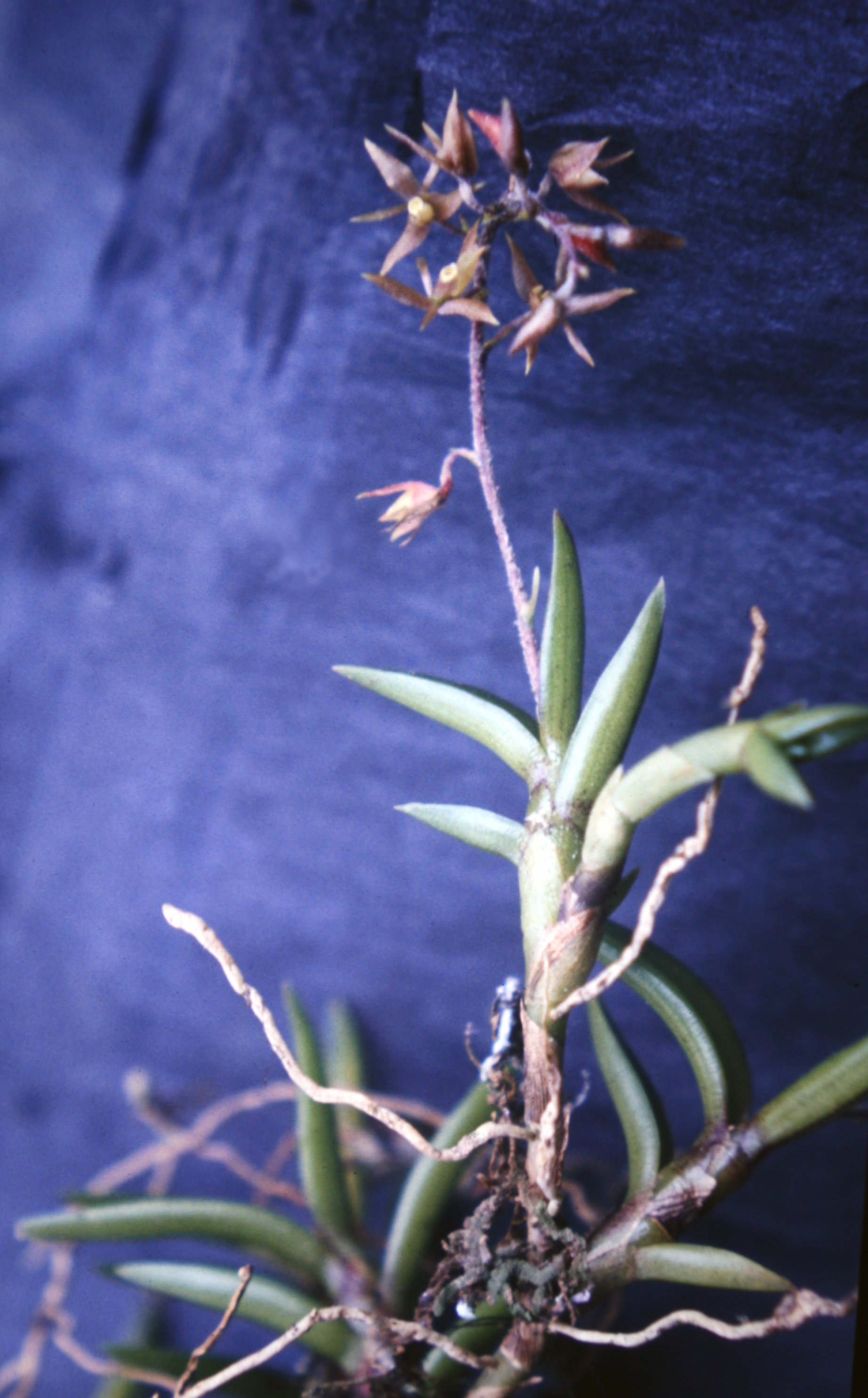

Scientific classification
- Kingdom: Plantae
- Clade: Tracheophytes
- Clade: Angiosperms
- Clade: Monocots
- Order: Asparagales
- Family: Orchidaceae
- Subfamily: Epidendroideae
- Genus: Epidendrum
- Subgenus: Epidendrum subg. Epidendrum
- Section: Epidendrum sect. Sarcophylla
- Species: E. microphyllum

Binomial name
- Epidendrum microphyllum Rich. (1792)

Synonyms
- Epidendrum sarcophyllum Focke (1851); Lanium microphyllum (Lindl.) Benth. (1881); Lanium colombianum Schltr. (1920); Lanium peruvianum Schltr. (1921); Lanium microphyllum subsp. colombianum (Schltr.) Brieger (1977)

= Epidendrum microphyllum =

Species of plant

Epidendrum microphyllum is a species of tropical orchid in the genus Epidendrum with non-resupinate flowers.

== Description ==
E. microphyllum grows epiphytically at low altitudes in the tropical rain forests of northern Brazil, Colombia, Ecuador (including a site in Napo at 180 m), French Guiana, Guyana, Peru, Suriname, and Venezuela. The small sympodial plant bears rather widely separated (3–5 cm) short, erect stems covered with imbricating sheathes, most of which bear the thick, narrow, alternate leaves. The small (1 cm across) woolly green flowers (sometimes with purple pigment as well) are born on a woolly, apical raceme. The dorsal sepal bends backward, nearly parallel to the ovary, unlike the spreading lateral sepals. The petals are linear to narrowly elliptic, and bend backward to a lesser degree than the dorsal sepal. The lateral margins of the pointed lip partially encircle the apex of the column.

== Systematics ==
In 1861, Reichenbach classified this orchid as the only species in the section Sarcophylla Rchb.f. of subgenus Euepidendrum Lindl. of the genus Epidendrum. According to the Vienna code, the proper names for these subdivisions of the genus Epidendrum are E. sect. Sarcophylla and E. subg. Epidendrum.
