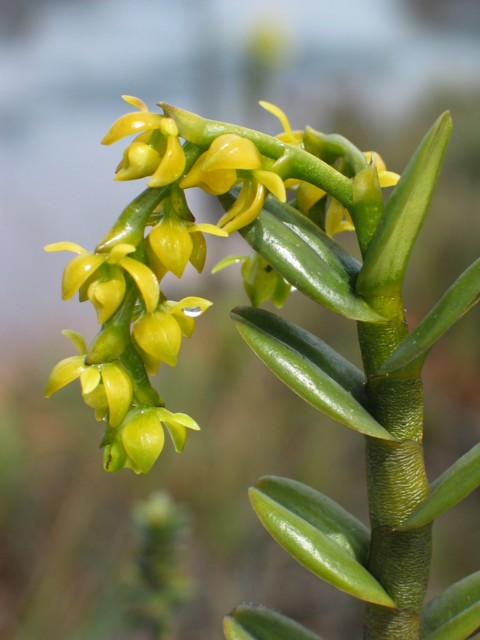

Scientific classification
- Kingdom: Plantae
- Clade: Tracheophytes
- Clade: Angiosperms
- Clade: Monocots
- Order: Asparagales
- Family: Orchidaceae
- Subfamily: Epidendroideae
- Genus: Epidendrum
- Subgenus: Epidendrum subg. Epidendrum
- Section: Epidendrum sect. Planifolia
- Subsection: Epidendrum subsect. Paniculata
- Species: E. dendrobioides

Binomial name
- Epidendrum dendrobioides Thunb.

Synonyms
- Epidendrum aquaticum Lindl.; Epidendrum carnosum var. nutans Cogn.; Epidendrum durum var. parviflorum Lindl.

= Epidendrum dendrobioides =

Species of orchid

Epidendrum dendrobioides is a species of orchid in the genus Epidendrum.

The name means that this Epidendrum (Greek for "upon a tree") resembles a Dendrobium (Greek for "tree grower"). This sympodial "tree grower" grows terrestrially in central Brazil, at altitudes of 600–900 m. Its stem can grow to 0.4 m tall. The coriaceous leaves are sessile, arising from clasping sheathes which cover the stem. The congested paniculate inflorescence arises from the apex of the stem and bears small, fleshy yellow flowers.
