= Epidendrum durum =

Scientific classification
- Kingdom: Plantae
- Clade: Tracheophytes
- Clade: Angiosperms
- Clade: Monocots
- Order: Asparagales
- Family: Orchidaceae
- Subfamily: Epidendroideae
- Tribe: Epidendreae
- Subtribe: Laeliinae
- Genus: Epidendrum
- Species: E. durum

Binomial name
- Epidendrum durum Lindl.

Synonyms
- Epidendrum carnosum Lindl.

Species of plant

Epidendrum durum is a species of flowering plant in the family Orchidaceae, native to north Brazil, Colombia, Guyana and Venezuela. It was first described by John Lindley in 1841.

Epidendrum durum var. parviflorum is a synonym of Epidendrum dendrobioides.
