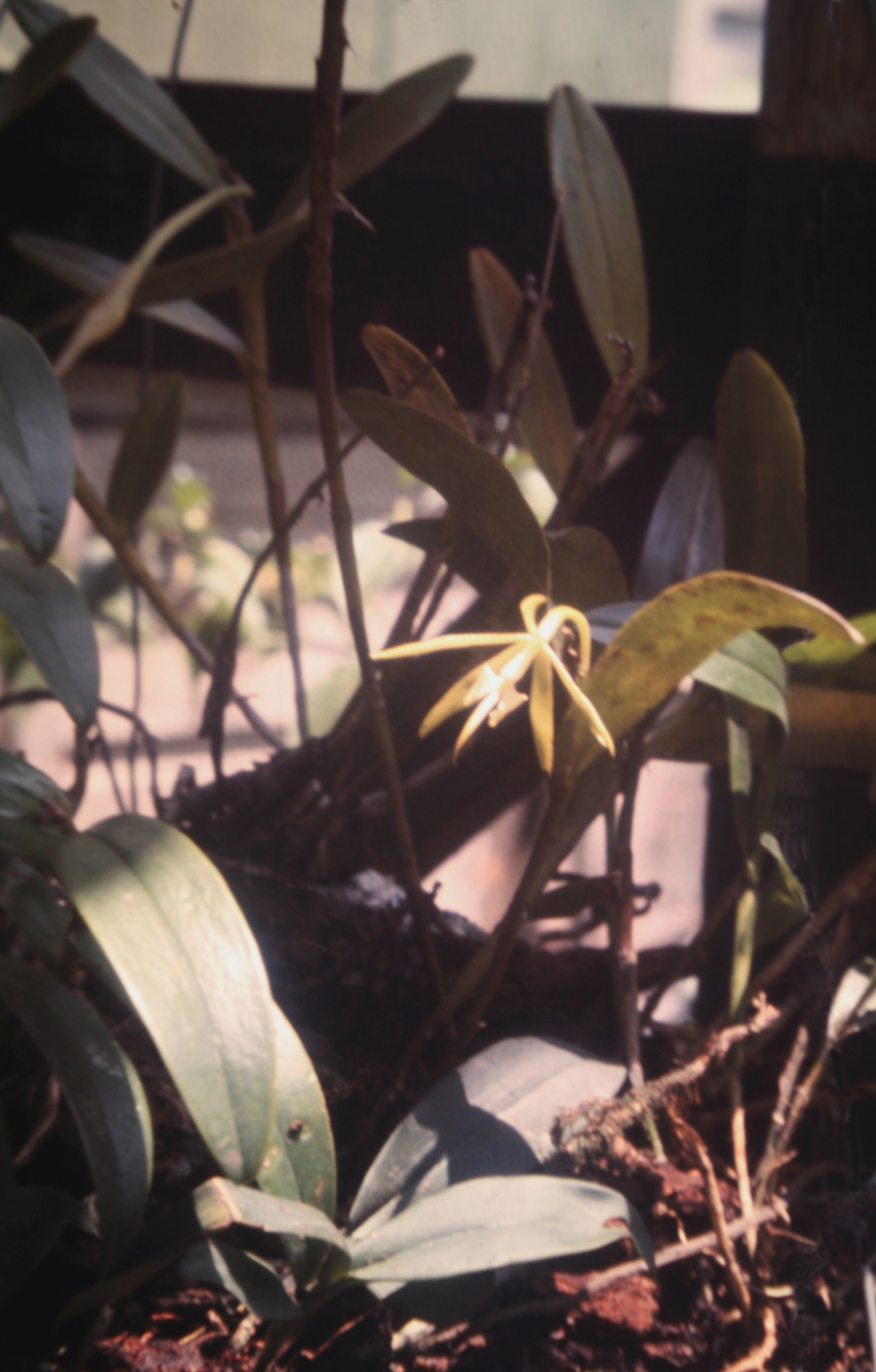
- Epidendrum nocturnum

Scientific classification
- Kingdom: Plantae
- Clade: Tracheophytes
- Clade: Angiosperms
- Clade: Monocots
- Order: Asparagales
- Family: Orchidaceae
- Subfamily: Epidendroideae
- Genus: Epidendrum
- Subgenus: Epidendrum subg. Epidendrum
- Section: Epidendrum sect. Planifolia
- Subsection: Epidendrum subsect. Umbellata; Rchb.f.

= Epidendrum subsect. Umbellata =

Group of orchids

Epidendrum subsect. Umbellata Rchb.f. (1861) is a subsection of section E. sect. Planifolia Rchb.f. (1861) of subgenus E. subg. Epidendrum Lindl. (1841) of the genus Epidendrum of the Orchidaceae (orchid family). Plants of E. subsect. Umbellata differ from the other subsections of E. sect. Planifolia by producing inflorescences which are umbel-like. In 1861, Reichenbach recognized ten species in this subsection. Of these, nine are recognized with the same names by Kew (page numbers refer to Reichenbach):

Image	Name	Distribution	Elevation (m)	Page No.
	E. piperinum Lindl. (1845)	Colombia (Cauca) and northern Ecuador	2,650–3,200 metres (8,690–10,500 ft)	p. 401
	E. difforme Jacq.(1760)	Leeward and Windward Islands, Trinidad	1,500 metres (4,900 ft)	pp. 402–403
	E. lacertinum Lindl.(1841)	Guatemala and Mexico (Chiapas)	1,500–2,900 metres (4,900–9,500 ft)	pp. 403–404
	E. latilabre Lindl.(1841)	Brazil, French Guiana, Peru and Bolivia	350–1,830 metres (1,150–6,000 ft)	p. 403
	E. longicolle Lindl. (1838)	Venezuela, Guyana, Trinidad, northern Brazil, Ecuador and Peru	50–1,000 metres (160–3,280 ft)	p. 404
	E. nocturnum Jacq. (1760)	Florida, Bahamas, Puerto Rico, Windward Islands, Leewards Islands, Haiti, Dominican Republic, Cuba, Jamaica, Cayman Islands, Trinidad & Tobago, Mexico, Guatemala, Belize, El Salvador, Honduras, Nicaragua, Costa Rica, Panama, Colombia, Venezuela, Guyana, Fr Guiana, Surinam, Brazil, Peru and Bolivia	100–2,000 metres (330–6,560 ft)	p. 404, the type species of the genus Epidendrum
	E. sculptum Rchb.f. (1854)	Mexico, Belize, Guatemala, Honduras, Nicaragua, Costa Rica, Panama, Colombia, Venezuela, Fr Guiana, Guyana, Surinam and Brazil	300–400 metres (980–1,310 ft)	p. 401
	E. tetraceros Rchb.f. (1852)	Costa Rica	1,800–2,400 metres (5,900–7,900 ft)	p. 403
	E. tolimense Lindl. (1845)	Costa Rica, Colombia and southern Ecuador	2,450–3,400 metres (8,040–11,150 ft)	p. 402

The tenth species listed by Reichenbach, E. ensatum, is identified by Kew as a synonym of E. anceps Jacq. (1763), which was classified by Reichenbach (p. 385) in the subsection E. subsect. Integra of E. sect. Schistochila of E. subg. Amphiglottium.

The diagnosis and name of this subsection were published on page 397 of Reichenbach, 1861, as

Folia plana, bracteis depauperatis. floribus umbellatis . . . . . . . . . . C. Planifolia umbellata.
