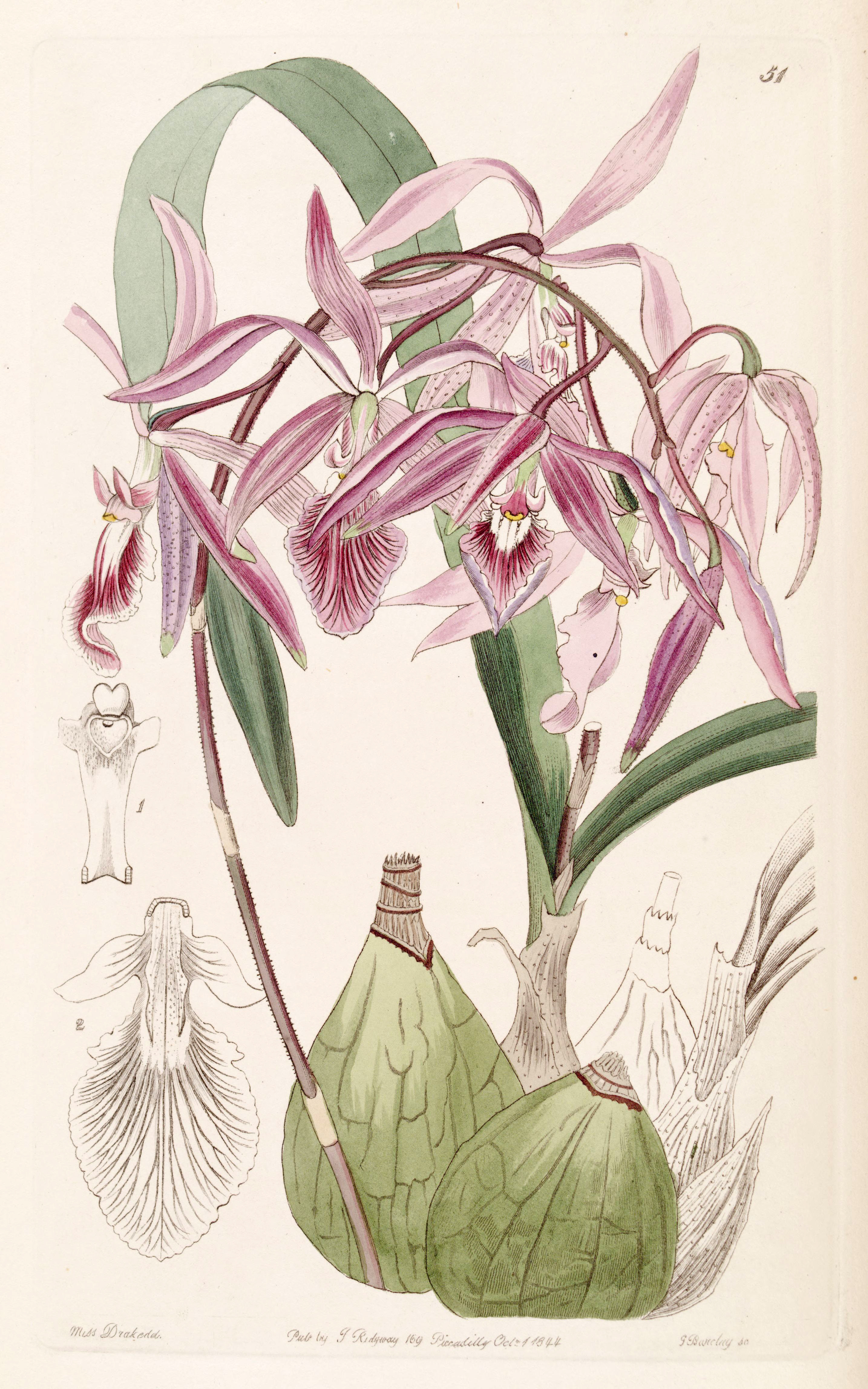

Scientific classification
- Kingdom: Plantae
- Clade: Tracheophytes
- Clade: Angiosperms
- Clade: Monocots
- Order: Asparagales
- Family: Orchidaceae
- Subfamily: Epidendroideae
- Genus: Encyclia
- Species: E. adenocaula

Binomial name
- Encyclia adenocaula (Lex.) Schltr.

Synonyms
- Encyclia nemoralis (Lindl.) Schltr.; Epidendrum adenocaulon Lex. (basionym); Epidendrum nemorale Lindl.; Epidendrum nemorale var. majus R.Warner; Epidendrum verrucosum Lindl.

= Encyclia adenocaula =

Species of orchid

Encyclia adenocaula is a species of epiphytic orchid of light purple flowers, native to forests in Mexico.

== Description ==
The orchid species is a small to medium-sized, cool growing, epiphytic species, with clustered, ovoid to subconical pseudobulbs carrying 2 to 3, towards the apex, strap-shaped to linear, acute or obtuse apically, gradually narrowing below into the base leaves. It blooms in the summer on an apical, to a 3 foot+ [90 cm+] long, paniculate, many flowered inflorescence that has a warty rachis, pedicel and ovary, as well as long-lasting, fragrant flowers.

The flowers are rosy-pink to magenta, star-shaped flowers with narrow petals. The long pointed lip has dark pink markings and an interesting winged column.

== Distribution and habitat ==
Encyclia adenocaula grows in dry forests of oak and or pine at altitudes of 1000 to 2000 meters in the western Durango, Sinaloa, Jalisco, Michoacan, Guerrero and Mexico states of Mexico.

== Gallery ==
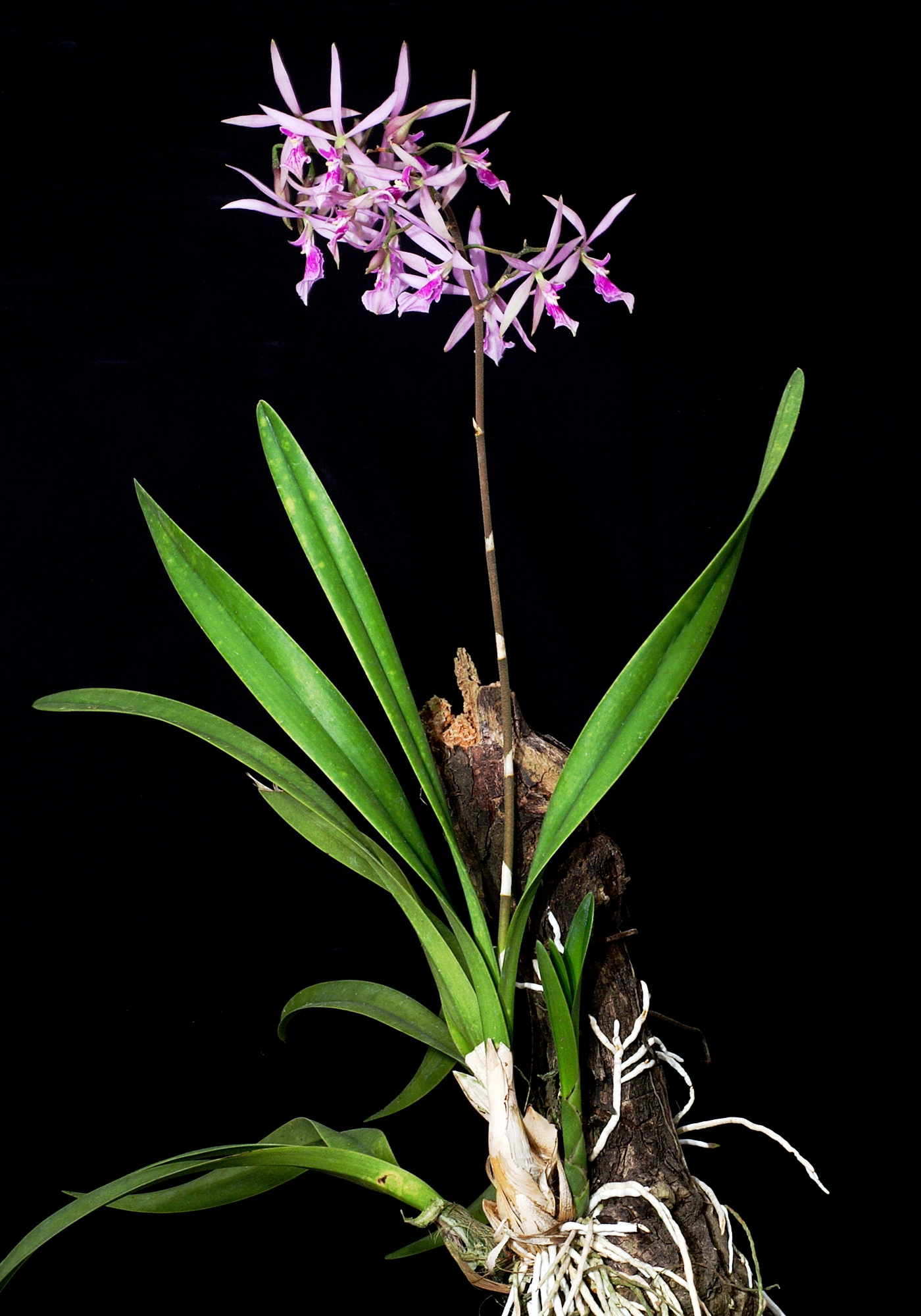
Encyclia adenocaula plant

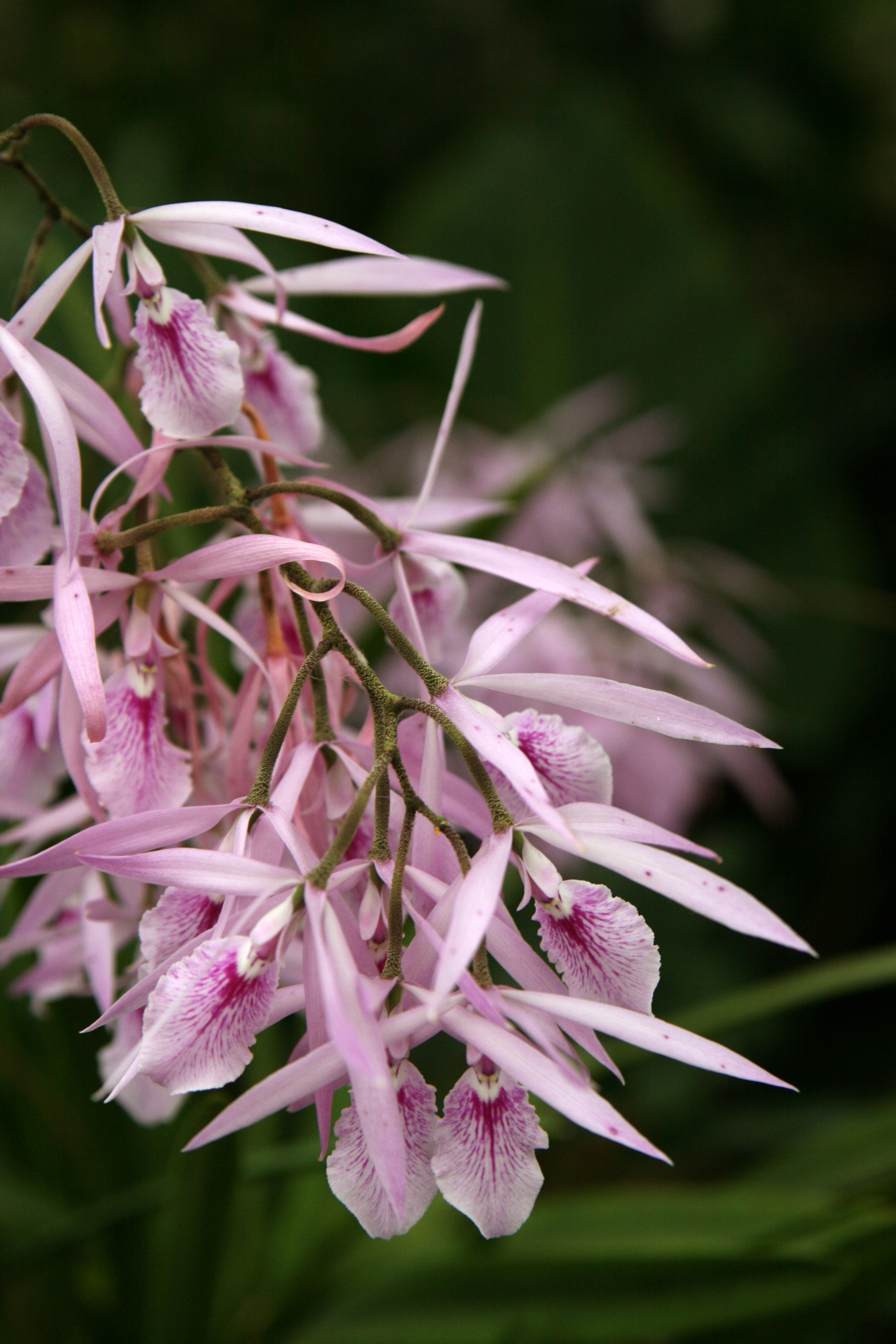
Encyclia adenocaula flowers

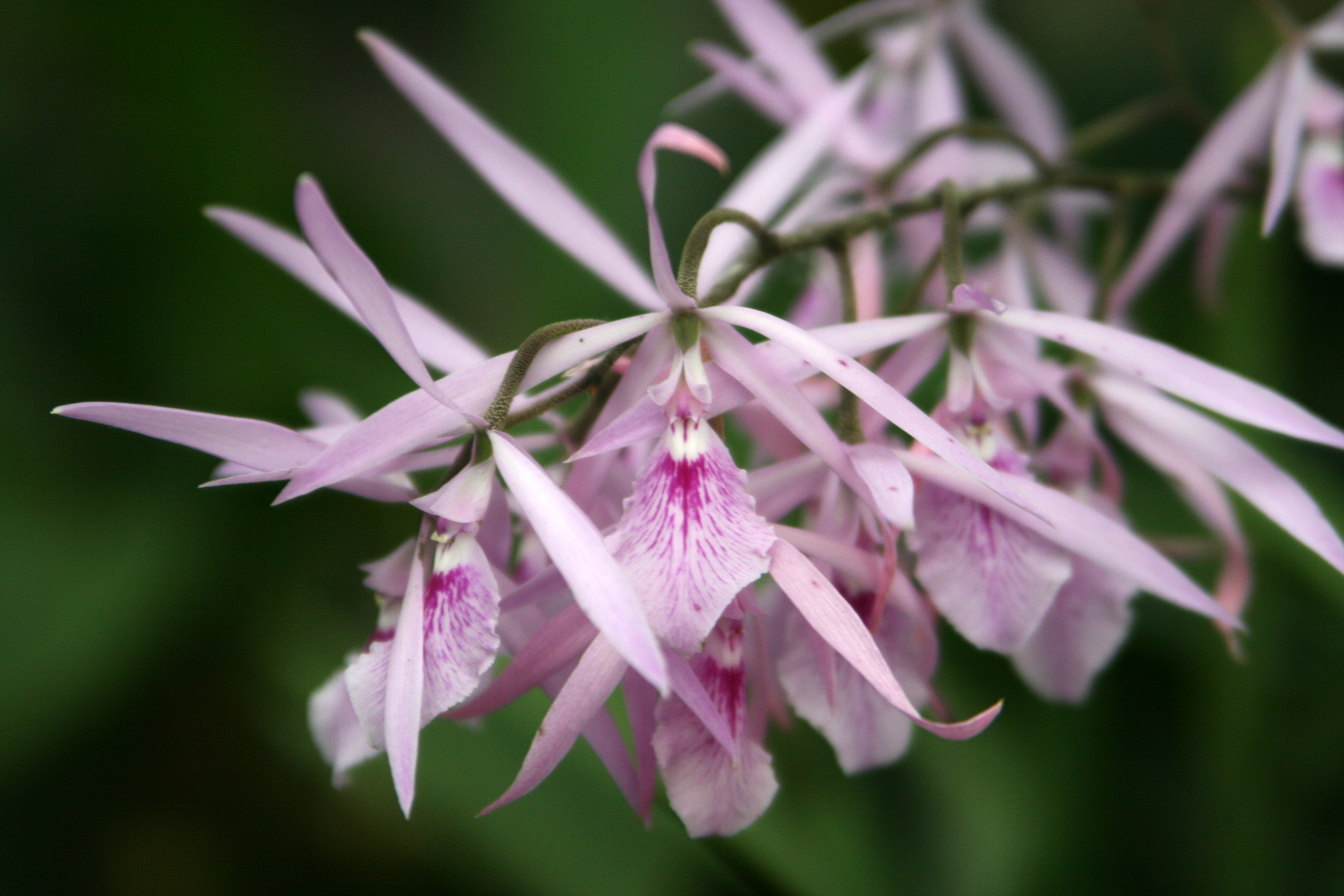
Encyclia adenocaula flowers

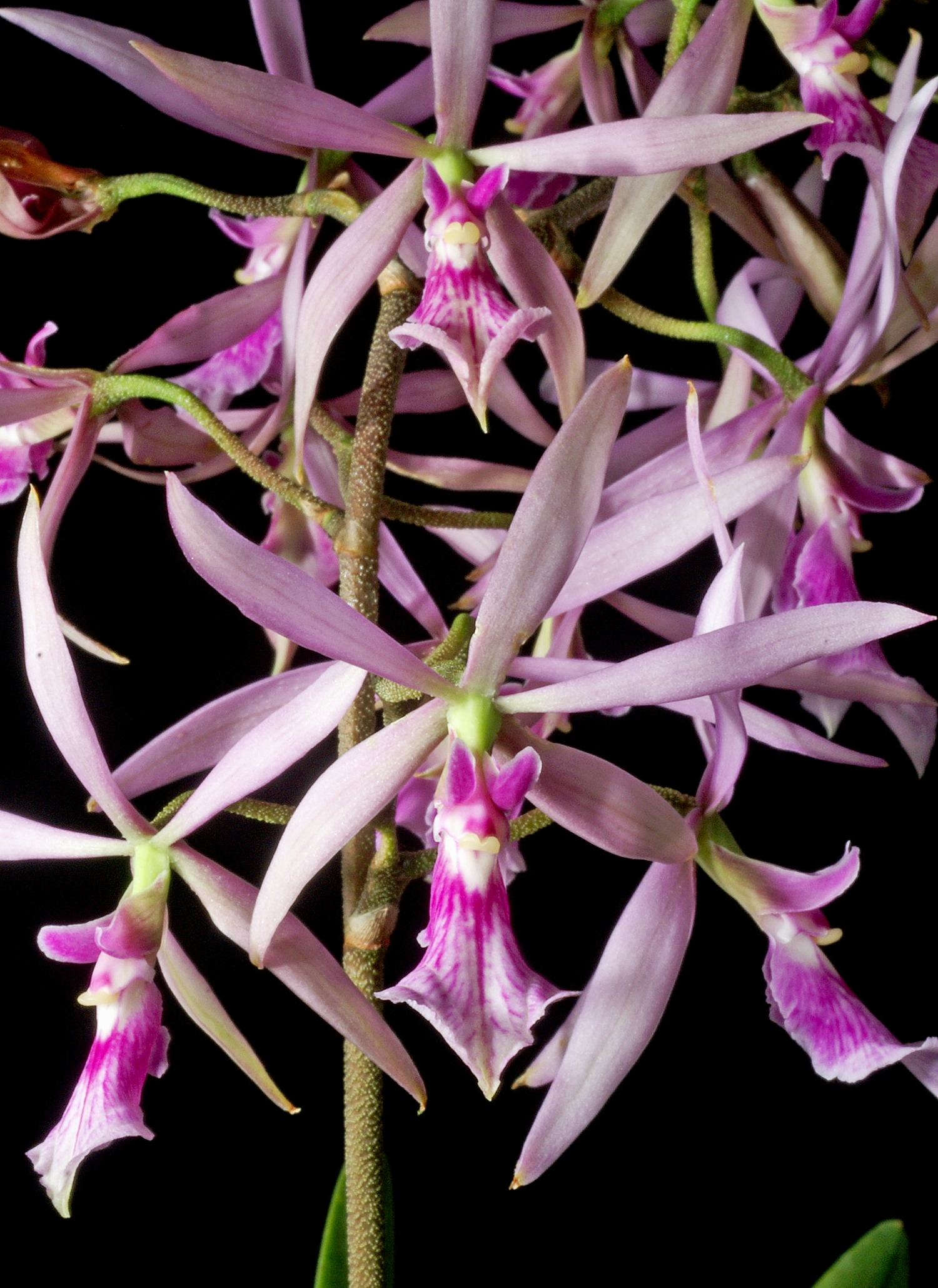
Encyclia adenocaula flowers
