= James David Ackerman =

American botanist

James D. Ackerman
- Born: James David Ackerman; 1950 (age 75–76)
- Education: Florida State University
- Scientific career
- Fields: Botany, Orchidology
- Institutions: University of Puerto Rico
- Author abbrev. (botany): Ackerman

James David Ackerman (born 1950) is an American botanist specializing in orchids.

In 1981, he earned his Ph.D. in Biology from Florida State University. He is a professor of biology in the Department of Biology at the University of Puerto Rico.
