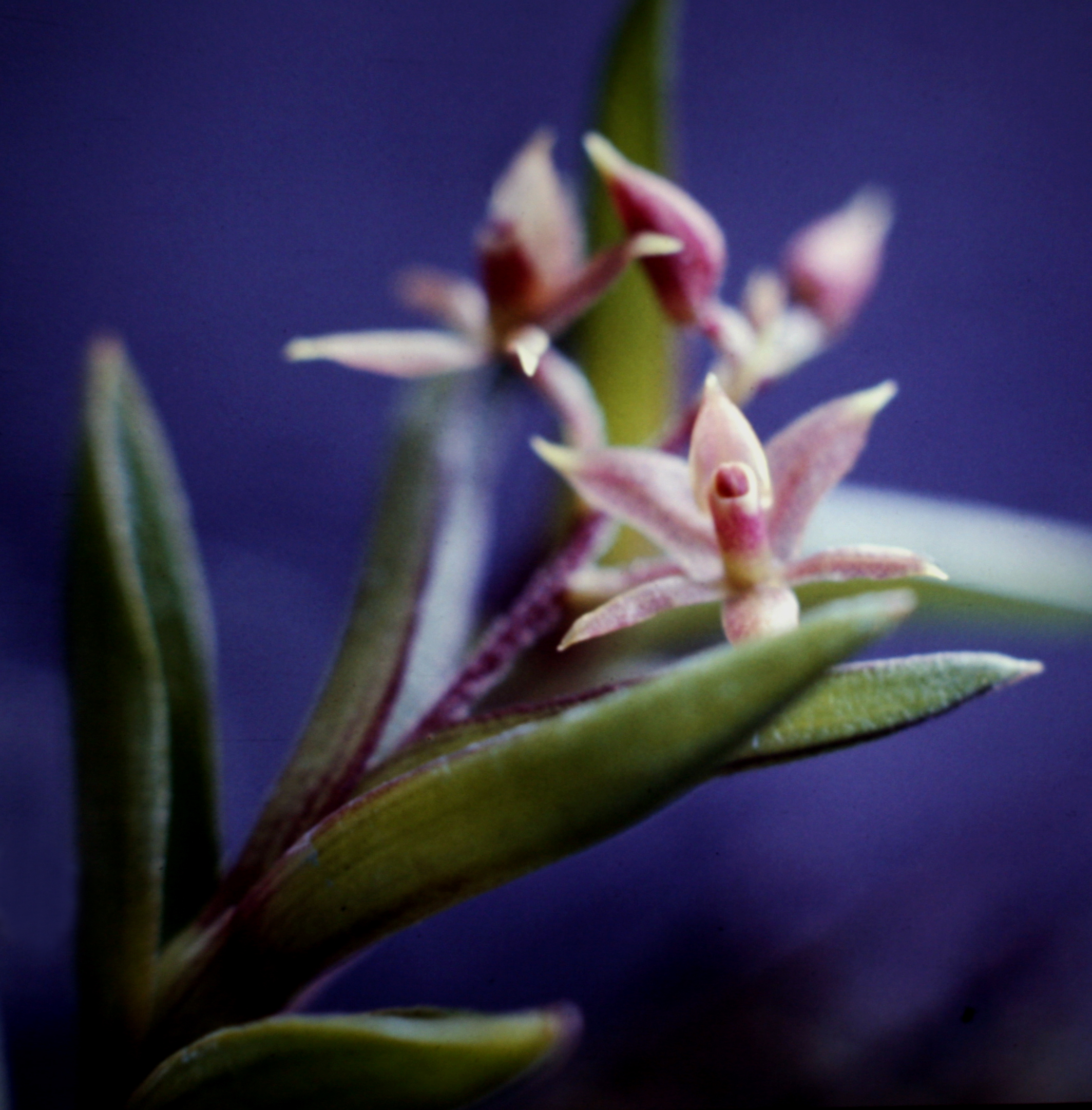

Scientific classification
- Kingdom: Plantae
- Clade: Tracheophytes
- Clade: Angiosperms
- Clade: Monocots
- Order: Asparagales
- Family: Orchidaceae
- Subfamily: Epidendroideae
- Genus: Epidendrum
- Subgenus: Epidendrum subg. Epidendrum
- Section: Epidendrum sect. Sarcophylla; Rchb.f.

= Epidendrum sect. Sarcophylla =

Group of orchids

The section Epidendrum sect. Sarcophylla Rchb.f. is a subsection of subgenus E. subg. Epidendrum of the genus Epidendrum of the Orchidaceae. In 1861, Reichenbach recognized one species in this section:

- E. microphyllum Lindl. 1841
