= Epidendrum sect. Equitantia =

Scientific classification
- Kingdom: Plantae
- Clade: Tracheophytes
- Clade: Angiosperms
- Clade: Monocots
- Order: Asparagales
- Family: Orchidaceae
- Subfamily: Epidendroideae
- Genus: Epidendrum
- Subgenus: Epidendrum subg. Epidendrum
- Section: Epidendrum sect. Equitantia; Rchb.f.

Group of orchids

The section Epidendrum sect. EquitantiaRchb.f. 1861 of the subgenus E. subg. Epidendrum Lindl. 1841 of the genus Epidendrum of the Orchidaceae was published in 1861 by Reichenbach with the notation

Folia equitantia . . . . . . . . . . . . . . . . A. Equitantia.

Epidendrum sect. Equitantia differs from the other sections by having leaves that overlap at the base to form a fan, similar to the leaves of a Tolumnia or Iris.

Reichenbach did not list any subsections of Epidendrum sect. Equitantia. Of the two species placed in this section by Reichenbach, Epidendrum Equitans Lindl. (1838) nom. illeg. has been moved to Jacquiniella equitantifolia (Ames) Dressler (1966), leaving only one species placed in this section by Reichenbach and accepted by Kew:

- E. vesicatum Lindl. (1838) (p. 397 of Reichenbach, 1861)
