= Epidendrum ramosum =

Scientific classification
- Kingdom: Plantae
- Clade: Tracheophytes
- Clade: Angiosperms
- Clade: Monocots
- Order: Asparagales
- Family: Orchidaceae
- Subfamily: Epidendroideae
- Genus: Epidendrum
- Subgenus: Epidendrum subg. Amphiglottium
- Section: Epidendrum sect. Holochila
- Species: E. ramosum

Binomial name
- Epidendrum ramosum Jacq.

Synonyms
- Isochilus ramosum Spreng. Epidendrum rigidum Lodd. nom. illeg. Epidendrum sellowii Rchb.f. Isochilus ramosus Focke; Epidendrum ramosum House nom. illeg. Epidendrum imbricatum var. angustifolium Cogn. Epidendrum flexicaule Schltr. Epidendrum modestiflorum Schltr. Spathiger ramosus (Jacq.) Britt. Epidendrum zanonii Dod

Species of orchid

Epidendrum ramosum, the mountain star orchid, is a neotropical species of reed-stemmed Epidendrum orchid which grows both epiphytically and terrestrially at altitudes near 1 km.

== Description ==
Epidendrum ramosum stems do not swell into pseudobulbs, are highly branched, and are covered with close, tubular sheathes, the upper ones bearing longish leaves which are rounded at the apex. The short, scaly, apical peduncle bears a raceme with large, alternate floral bracts which nearly cover the long pedicellate ovaries of the few green-yellow flowers. The sepals are oblong-acute, 5–6 mm long and 2 mm wide; the petals are narrower. The cordate acute lip is adnate to the column to its apex, has no lateral lobes, and bears a callus consisting of two keel-like ridges near the column apex. The four pollinia are white.

== Homonymy ==
Five varieties of E. ramosum have been published, three of which are now recognized as separate species:

- E. ramosum var. imbricatum Ames, F.T.Hubb. & C.Schweinf is a synonym for E. paranaense Barb.Rodr.
- E. ramosum var. lanceolatum Griseb. is a synonym for E. antillanum Ackerman & Hágsater
- E. ramosum var. mixtum (Schltr.) Ames, F.T.Hubb & C.Schweinf. is a synonym for E. mixtum Schltr.
