= Epidendrum sect. Planifolia =

Scientific classification
- Kingdom: Plantae
- Clade: Embryophytes
- Clade: Tracheophytes
- Clade: Spermatophytes
- Clade: Angiosperms
- Clade: Monocots
- Order: Asparagales
- Family: Orchidaceae
- Subfamily: Epidendroideae
- Genus: Epidendrum
- Subgenus: Epidendrum subg. Epidendrum
- Section: Epidendrum sect. Planifolia; Rchb.f.

Group of orchids

The section Epidendrum sect. Planifolia of the subgenus E. subg. Epidendrum Lindl. 1841 of the genus Epidendrum of the Orchidaceae was published in 1861 by Reichenbach It differs from the other three sections (E. sect. Equitantia Rchb.f. 1841, E. sect. Sarcophylla Rchb.f., and E. sect. Teretifolia Rchb.f.) by having flat (instead of round) leaves. Like the other sections of E. subg. Epidendrum, the inflorescence grows from the apex of the stem, and bears no spathe or sheath at the base of the peduncle.

As defined by Reichenbach, the section contains four subsections:

- E. subsect. Spathacea (published as "Planifolia spathacea" with the diagnosis "Folia plana, bracteis spathaceis saepius ancipitibus"), with large floral bracts
- E. subsect. Umbellata, (published as "Planifolia umbellata" with the diagnosis "Folia plana, bracteis depauperatis. floribus umbellatis"), with umbell-like inflorescences
- E. subsect. Racemosa (published as "Planifolia racemosa" with the diagnosis "Folia plana, bracteis depauperatis. floribus racemosis"), with racemose inflorescences
- E. subsect. Paniculata (published as "Planifolia paniculata" with the diagnosis "Folia plana, bracteis depauperatis. floribus paniculatis"), with paniculate inflorescences.
