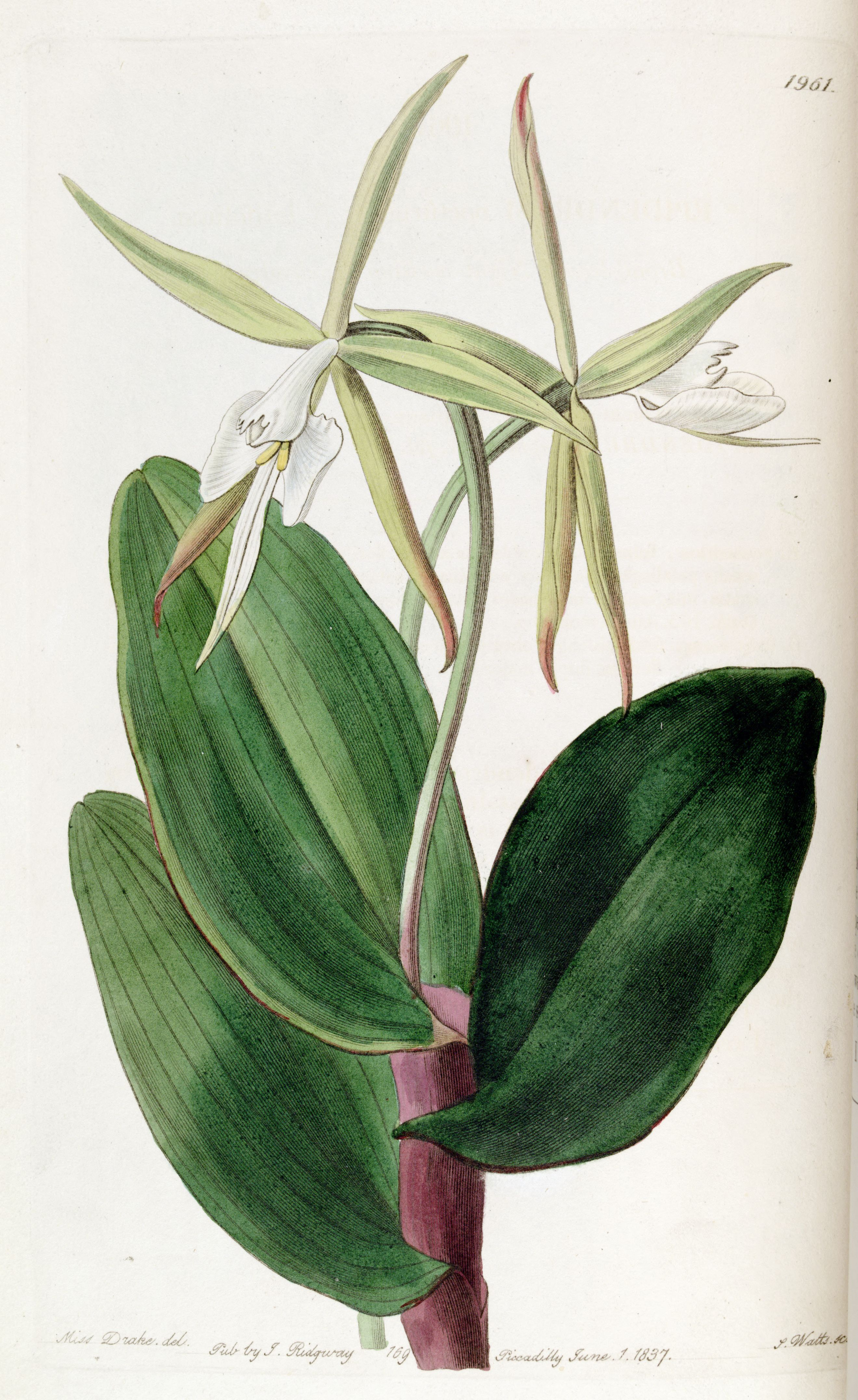

Scientific classification
- Kingdom: Plantae
- Clade: Tracheophytes
- Clade: Angiosperms
- Clade: Monocots
- Order: Asparagales
- Family: Orchidaceae
- Subfamily: Epidendroideae
- Genus: Epidendrum
- Subgenus: Epidendrum subg. Epidendrum; Lindl.

= Epidendrum subg. Epidendrum =

Subgenus of orchids

The subgenus Epidendrum subg. Epidendrum was published as "Euepidendrum" in 1841 with the diagnosis "Caulis foliosus. Pedunculus brevis esquamatus. Labellum adnatum." This reed-stemmed genus includes sympodial Epidendrum plants with stems covered with imbricating sheaths which show no tendency to swell into pseudobulbs, and with terminal inflorescences which lack any sheath or spathe at the base.

Reichenbach recognized four sections in this subgenus:

- E. Equitantia
- E. Sarcophylla
- E. Teretifolia
- E. Planifolia
