= Epidendrum adenoglossum =

Scientific classification
- Kingdom: Plantae
- Clade: Tracheophytes
- Clade: Angiosperms
- Clade: Monocots
- Order: Asparagales
- Family: Orchidaceae
- Subfamily: Epidendroideae
- Genus: Epidendrum
- Subgenus: Epidendrum subg. Spathium
- Species: E. adenoglossum

Binomial name
- Epidendrum adenoglossum Lindl. (1841)

Species of orchid

Epidendrum adenoglossum is an orchid known primarily from its type herbarium specimen, Mathews 1073, collected in Peru near Pangoa. When Lindley published the name, he placed the species in the subgenus E. subg. Spathium Lindl. (1841). In 2005, Hágsater & Soto designated this species as the lectotype of E. subg. Spathium Lindl. (1841).

== Description ==
Epidendrum adenoglossum is a sympodial orchid with stems which show no tendency to produce pseudobulbs. The stems are covered with imbricating sheathes, which bear sessile leaves on the upper part of the stem. The fleshy, distichous, linear-oblong obtuse leaves grow up to 15 cm long by 2 cm wide. The elongate, densely many-flowered racemose inflorescence grows from a terminal ancipitous spathe, 5.5 cm long. The sepals are ovate and acute, the dorsal 5 mm long, the laterals oblique and larger than the dorsal. The linear-acute petals are three-veined. The linear-oblong, obtuse lip is adnate to the column to its apex, and is not separated into lobes. The callus consists of three short keels.

Mathews did not note the colors of the flowers.
