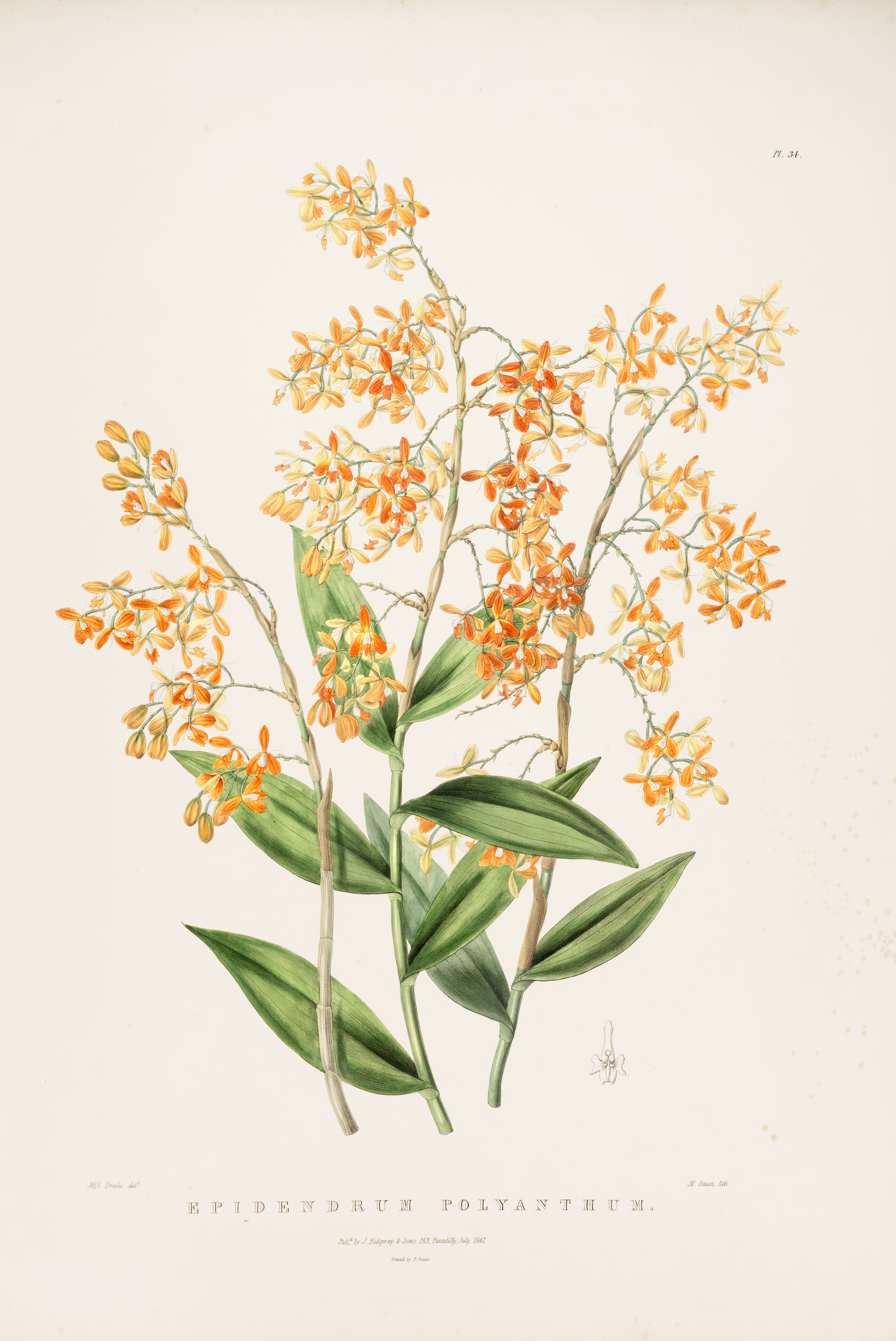
- Epidendrum polyanthum

Scientific classification
- Kingdom: Plantae
- Clade: Tracheophytes
- Clade: Angiosperms
- Clade: Monocots
- Order: Asparagales
- Family: Orchidaceae
- Subfamily: Epidendroideae
- Genus: Epidendrum
- Subgenus: Epidendrum subg. Amphiglottium
- Section: Epidendrum sect. Polycladia; Rchb.f.

= Epidendrum sect. Polycladia =

Group of orchids

Epidendrum sect. Polycladia Rchb.f. 1861 is a section of the Subgenus E. subg. Amphiglottium Lindl. of the Genus Epidendrum of the Orchidaceae. This plants in this section differ from the plants in the other sections of E. subg. Amphiglottium by having truly paniculate inflorescences: the section E. sect. Holochila is characterized by racemose inflorescences and an undivided lip, and the section E. sect. Schistochila is characterized by racemose inflorescences and a lobed lip.

Like the other members of E. subg. Amphiglottium, the members of Epidendrum sect. Polycladia "possess a long leafy stem with distichous leaves, an absence of any tendency to form pseudobulbs, a peduncle suddenly covered with close sheaths, and a lip wholly united to the column."

Lindley anticipated the section Epidendrum sect. Polycladia by publishing E. porphyreum under the title "AMPHIGLOTTIUM; floribus paniculatis.

Reichenbach placed 16 species in this Section. The following species are recognized by Kew (page numbers refer to Reichenbach 1861):

- E. blepharistes Barker ex. Lindl. (1844) including E. funkii Rchb.f. (1850) on pp. 377–378 and E. brachycladium Lindl.(1853) on p. 379
- E. compressum Griseb. (1864), including E. laxum Popp. & Endl.(1836) nom. illeg. on p. 377
- E. densiflorum Hook. (1840), including E. polyanthum var. densiflorum (Hook.) Lindl.(1853) and E. rubrocinctum Lindl.(1843) included by Muller in E. polyanthum.
- E. haenkeanum C.Presl. (1827) (p. 378)
- E. hymenodes Lindl. (1853) (p. 378)
- E. lignosum Lex. (1825) (p. 380)
- E. martianum Lindl. (p. 380)
- E. myrianthum Lindl.(1853) (p. 378-379)
- E. nutans Sw. (1788) (p. 376)
- E. pallidiflorum Hook. (1830) (p. 378)
- E. paniculatum Ruiz & Pav. (1798) (p. 376), including E. fastigiatum Lindl.(1853) nom. illeg.(p. 376-377)
- E. polyanthum Lindl. (1831) (p. 379-380)
- E. porphyreum Lindl. (1841) (p. 377)
- E. saxatile Lindl. (1841), which Reichenbach 1861 listed as E. miersii Lindl.(1853) on p. 378
