= Epidendrum alpicola =

Scientific classification
- Kingdom: Plantae
- Clade: Tracheophytes
- Clade: Angiosperms
- Clade: Monocots
- Order: Asparagales
- Family: Orchidaceae
- Subfamily: Epidendroideae
- Genus: Epidendrum
- Subgenus: Epidendrum subg. Spathium
- Species: E. alpicola

Binomial name
- Epidendrum alpicola Rchb.f.

Species of plant

Epidendrum alpicola is a tropical orchid native to Bolivia, Colombia, Ecuador, Peru, and Venezuela at altitudes from 1.8—2.7 km.

== Description ==
Epidendrum alpicola is a sympodial epiphyte with slender, flattened stems, to 60 cm tall. The stems are covered by tubular sheathes, which bear leaves on the upper part of the stem. The distichous linear-lanceolate leaves are often bilobulate at the apex. The cylindrical, racemose, many-flowered inflorescence erupts from a solitary spathe (sometimes twin spathes) at the apex of the stem, as is typical of the subgenus E. subg. Spathium. The lanceolate-acuminate sepals are wedge shaped at the base: the dorsal 7–12 mm long by as little as 2 mm wide; the lateral sepals slightly larger and asymmetrical at the base. The linear petals are much shorter than the petals. The trilobate lip is adnate to the column to its apex: cordate at the base, with minute crenelations on the lateral lobes, two callosities at the base, and three or more shallow keels running down the midlobe from near the column apex.

== Taxonomy ==
The species was first published under the name Epidendrum alpicolum in 1854. However, epithets ending in -cola (meaning 'dweller') are treated as nouns in apposition rather than adjectives, so the epithet has been corrected to alpicola.
