= Epidendrum cornutum =

Scientific classification
- Kingdom: Plantae
- Clade: Tracheophytes
- Clade: Angiosperms
- Clade: Monocots
- Order: Asparagales
- Family: Orchidaceae
- Subfamily: Epidendroideae
- Genus: Epidendrum
- Subgenus: Epidendrum subg. Spathium
- Species: E. cornutum

Binomial name
- Epidendrum cornutum Lindl.

Synonyms
- Epidendrum anthoceros Lind. & Rchb.f. (1854); Epidendrum Pavonianum Rchb.f. (1856); Epidendrum melinoacron Schltr. (1921)

Species of orchid

Epidendrum cornutum is the accepted name for a species of Epidendrum native to Colombia, Ecuador, Peru, and Venezuela at altitudes of 2.4–3 km.

The stem of this epiphyte is covered by close, tubular sheathes which bear bamboo-like (lnarrow, linear-lanceolate, very acute, with a cuneate sessile base) leaves on the upper part of the stem. The foot-long terminal inflorescence emerges from 1—3 large sheathes which completely cover the peduncle, and ends in a densely flowered raceme of fragrant, fleshy, flowers with filiform petals and a deeply three-lobed lip with slightly denticulate margins. The flower color can be white, light yellow, light green, or tan.

== Homonymy ==
The identity of this taxon has been confused by the publication, in 1894, of a description of Stanhopea oculata (first described in 1832) under the name Epidendrum cornutum.
