= Epidendrum geminiflorum =

Scientific classification
- Kingdom: Plantae
- Clade: Tracheophytes
- Clade: Angiosperms
- Clade: Monocots
- Order: Asparagales
- Family: Orchidaceae
- Subfamily: Epidendroideae
- Genus: Epidendrum
- Subgenus: Epidendrum subg. Spathium
- Species: E. geminiflorum

Binomial name
- Epidendrum geminiflorum Kunth

Synonyms
- E. cajamarcae Schltr

Species of orchid

Epidendrum geminiflorum is a tropical epiphytic orchid native to Colombia, Ecuador, Peru, Suriname, and Venezuela at elevations of 2.3—2.9 km.

== Description ==
Epidendrum geminiflorum displays a sympodial habit, producing upright, slightly flexible stems ~1.5 dm tall, covered by tubular sheathes and ending in three to four oblong, obtuse to retuse, leathery leaves and a terminal spathe, through which the inflorescence erupts. The fleshy yellow-green to brown-green flowers have oblong-lanceolate sepals ~1.8 cm long and slightly shorter linear-lanceolate petals. The sepals curl backwards along their margins. The obscurely trilobate lip is adnate to the column to its apex, and cordate at the base. The medial lobe is acute.
