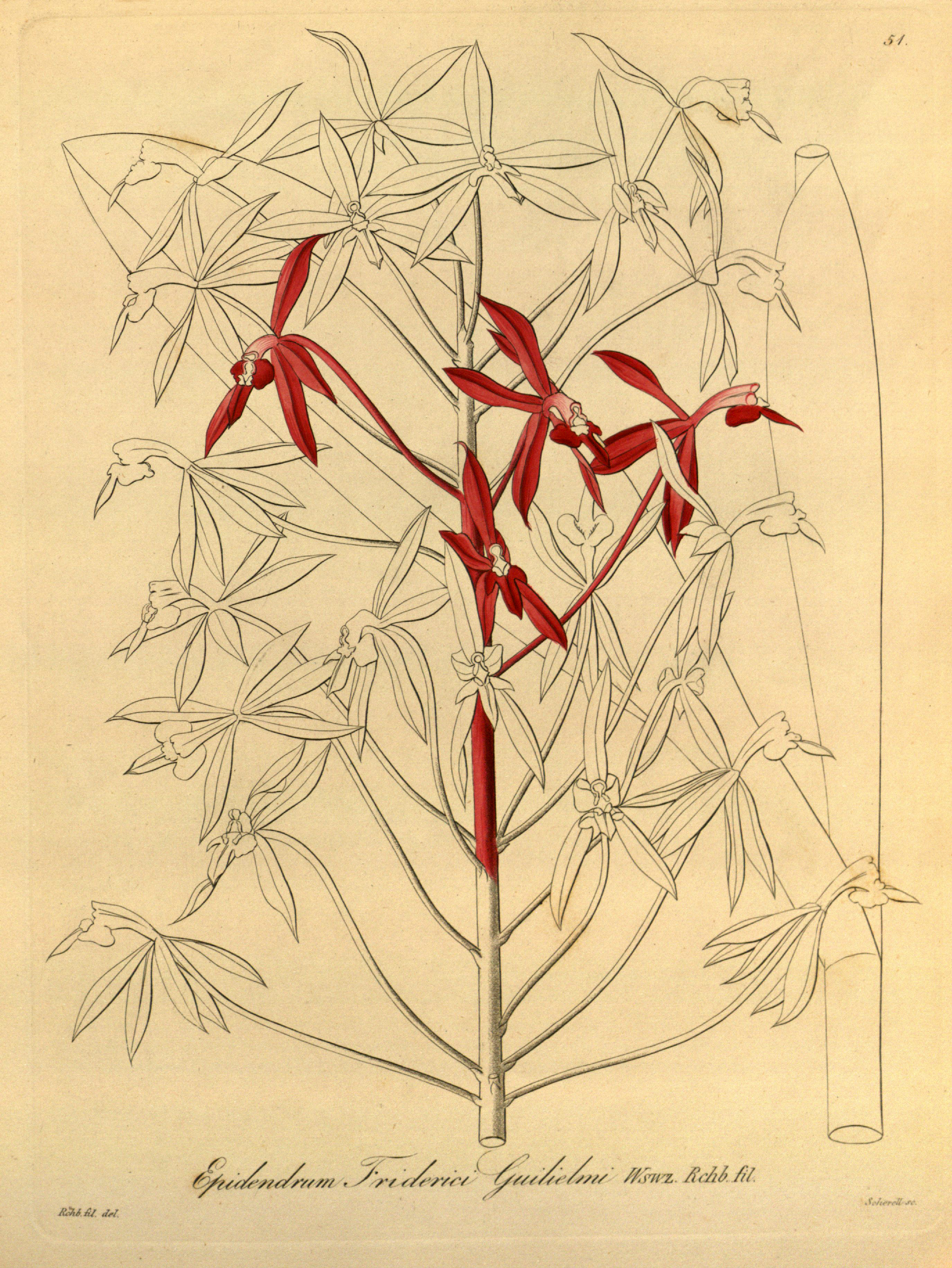

Scientific classification
- Kingdom: Plantae
- Clade: Tracheophytes
- Clade: Angiosperms
- Clade: Monocots
- Order: Asparagales
- Family: Orchidaceae
- Subfamily: Epidendroideae
- Genus: Epidendrum
- Subgenus: Epidendrum subg. Spathium
- Species: E. friderici-guilielmi

Binomial name
- Epidendrum friderici-guilielmi Rchb.f. & Warsz.

Synonyms
- Epidendrum huacapistanae Kraenzl.

= Epidendrum friderici-guilielmi =

Species of orchid

Epidendrum friderici-guilielmi is a species of orchid in the genus Epidendrum which grows naturally at altitudes of 1.7—3.0 km. in Peru and Bolivia.

== Description ==
Epidendrum friderici-guilielmi is a reed-stemmed Epidendrum, with tall, closely spaced stems covered by distichous, tubular sheaths. On the upper part of the stem, the sheathes bear broad oblong leaves, up to 3 dm long by 1 dm wide, which are pointed at the end. The very large peduncle erupts from a single elongate spathe at the apex of the stem. The racemose inflorescence bears many purple to crimsonflowers, with the widely opened segments as much as 1 dm from the floral axis. The sepals and petals grow 13–23 mm long, with the petals slightly shorter than the sepals. The lip is adnate to the column to its apex, is cordate where it separates from the column, and is deeply trilobate. The lateral lobes of the lip are rotund, and the medial lobe is tongue-shaped with a sharp end.
