= Epidendrum ruizianum =

Scientific classification
- Kingdom: Plantae
- Clade: Tracheophytes
- Clade: Angiosperms
- Clade: Monocots
- Order: Asparagales
- Family: Orchidaceae
- Subfamily: Epidendroideae
- Genus: Epidendrum
- Subgenus: Epidendrum subg. Spathium
- Species: E. ruizianum

Binomial name
- Epidendrum ruizianum Steud.

Synonyms
- Epidendrum nutans Ruiz & Pav. nom. illeg. Epidendrum spathaceum Lindl.

Species of orchid

Epidendrum ruizianum is an epiphytic reed-stemmed Epidendrum of the orchid family native to the cloud forests of Bolivia (including Cochabamba and La Paz), Colombia, Ecuador, Peru, and Venezuela, at altitudes of 2–3 km.

== Description ==
Epidendrum ruizianum belongs to the subgenus E. subg. Spathium Lindl., and as such is a sympodial plant with cylindrical, unswollen stems covered with close, imbricating sheathes which bear leaves on the upper part of the stem, and with the apical inflorescence erupting from an enlarged spathe. The stems grow to 90 cm tall. The keeled, leathery leaves grow to 16 cm long and 4 cm wide. The paniculate inflorescence grows as long as 50 cm, with the alternate, dense racemes emerging from falcate spathes 5 cm long. The yellow-green flowers have reflexed rigid striate acute sepals and reflexed filiform petals 10 mm long. The trilobate lip is adnate to the column to its apex, and is heart shaped and convex where it diverges from the column. The lateral lobes of the lip are fringed, and the medial lobe divides in two at its apex.

== Synonymy and homonymy ==
The synonym E. nutans Ruiz & Pav. (1798) is an illegitimate name because it is a homonym of E. nutans Sw. (1788), which is the accepted name of a different species.
