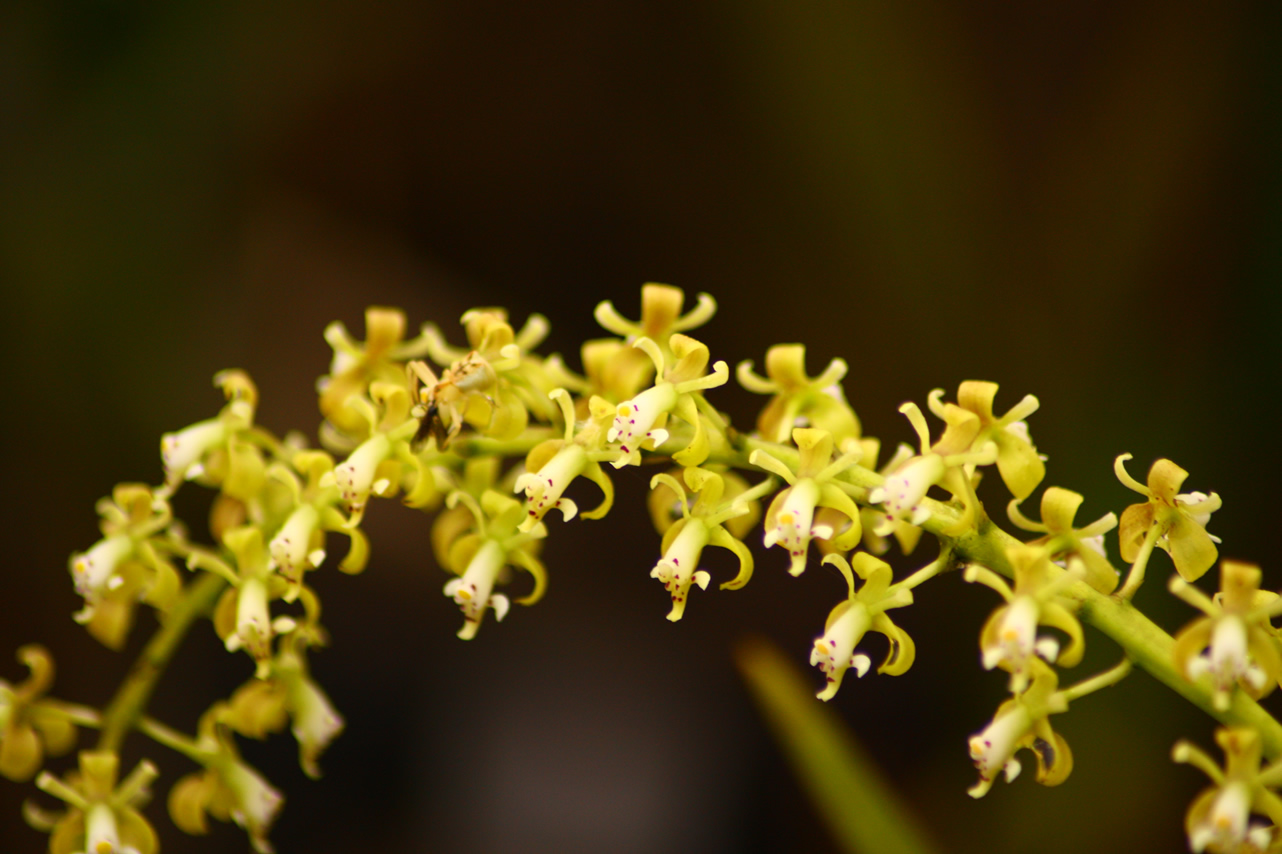

Scientific classification
- Kingdom: Plantae
- Clade: Tracheophytes
- Clade: Angiosperms
- Clade: Monocots
- Order: Asparagales
- Family: Orchidaceae
- Subfamily: Epidendroideae
- Genus: Epidendrum
- Subgenus: Epidendrum subg. Spathium
- Species: E. cylindrostachys

Binomial name
- Epidendrum cylindrostachys Rchb.f. & Warsz.

= Epidendrum cylindrostachys =

Species of orchid

Epidendrum cylindrostachys is an epiphytic orchid native to the mountainous rainforest of Colombia and Peru, at altitudes near 2.5 km. According to the World Checklist, this binomial has no synonyms or homonyms.

== Description ==
Epidendrum cylindrostachys is a reed-stemmed Epidendrum which H. G. Reichenbach placed in the subgenus E. subg. Spathium because the terminal inflorescence erupts through two narrow, ancipitous spathes. The closely spaced slender stems grow little more than 1 dm tall and are covered from the base by thin, imbricating sheaths. The top two or three of these sheaths bear linear-ligulate leaves which are longer than the stem. The inflorescence is a cylindric raceme bearing many small resupinate purple-spotted flowers subtended by very short linear-acute floral bracts. The oblanceolate-oblong dorsal sepal is 5 mm long, the obovate-oblong lateral sepals are slightly longer and noticeably broader. The lanceolate-liner petals are shorter than the sepals. The trilobate lip is adnate to the column to its apex. The lateral lobes of the lip are shaped like a half-moon. The fleshy central lobe is lanceolate and obtuse to retuse at the apex.
