= Epidendrum sect. Holochila =

Scientific classification
- Kingdom: Plantae
- Clade: Tracheophytes
- Clade: Angiosperms
- Clade: Monocots
- Order: Asparagales
- Family: Orchidaceae
- Subfamily: Epidendroideae
- Genus: Epidendrum
- Subgenus: Epidendrum subg. Amphiglottium
- Section: Epidendrum sect. Holochila; Rchb.f.

Group of orchids

Epidendrum sect. Holochila Rchb.f. 1861 is a section of subgenus Epidendrum subg. Amphiglottium of the Orchidaceae. It differs from section E. sect. Polycladia by bearing inflorescences that are racemes, not panicles. It differs from section E. sect. Schistochila by having a lip with no lobes. Like the other sections of E. subg. Amphiglottium, plants of E. sect. Holochila exhibit slender stems covered with close imbricating sheaths which do not swell to form pseudobulbs, and terminal inflorescences covered at the base with close imbricating sheaths but without spathes.

When he published the section, Reichenbach included fourteen species. Kew recognizes thirteen of these as separate species. (Page numbers refer to Reichenbach 1861).

- Epidendrum anceps Jacq. 1763 (p. 383 as E. galeottianum)
- Epidendrum biforatum Lindl. 1844 (p. 382 as E. cucullatum)
- Epidendrum costatum A.Rich. & Galeotti 1845 (p. 383)
- Epidendrum eustirum Ames, F.T.Hubb. & S.Schweinf. 1935 (p. 381 as E. carinatum)
- Epidendrum filicaule Lindl. 1831 (p. 383)
- Epidendrum hemiscleria Rchb.f. 1862 (p. 383) Kew accepts two subspecies:

E. hemiscleria subsp. hemiscleria
E. hemiscleria subsp. occidentalis

- Epidendrum longipetalum A.Rich. & Galeotti 1845 (p. 382 as E. antenniferum)
- Epidendrum martianum Lindl. 1840 (p. 381 as E. setiferum)
- Epidendrum miserrimum Rchb.f.1855 (p. 381)
- Epidendrum propinquum A.Rich. & Galeotti 1845 (p. 382 as E. lamprocaulon)
- Epidendrum proligerum Barb.Rodr. 1877 (pp. 380–381 as E. corymbosum)
- Epidendrum ramosum Jacq. 1760 (p. 383 as E. sellowii)
- Epidendrum fruticosum Pav. ex Lindl. 1831 (p. 381 as E. vieji)
