= Epidendrum brachyglossum =

Scientific classification
- Kingdom: Plantae
- Clade: Tracheophytes
- Clade: Angiosperms
- Clade: Monocots
- Order: Asparagales
- Family: Orchidaceae
- Subfamily: Epidendroideae
- Genus: Epidendrum
- Subgenus: Epidendrum subg. Spathium
- Species: E. brachyglossum

Binomial name
- Epidendrum brachyglossum Lindl.

Species of orchid

Epidendrum brachyglossum Lindl. 1844 is a species of Epidendrum orchid native to the western slopes of the Andes in Bolivia, Colombia, Ecuador and Peru, and has been reported at altitudes ranging from 1.8 km, near Ocaña, Ayacucho, Peru, to 2.8 km, in Cajamarca, Peru.

== Description ==
Epidendrum brachyglossum is a sympodial epiphyte with slender, simply-branching or paired stems which produce thick roots from a short section at the base. The stems are covered in loose, dry sheaths and bear two to several linear-oblong leaves, up to 12 cm × 2 cm, on the upper part. The elongate inflorescence arises from the apex of the stem, through one or two spathes, and terminates in a many-flowered raceme. The fleshy flowers are mostly green: the concave obovate-oblong to obovate-oblong sepals a darker shade, and the linear-oblanceolate-acute, three-nerved petals a lighter shade. The even lighter green trilobate lip is adnate to the column to the apex. The lateral lobes are erect, and much smaller than the ovate, acute medial lobe, which bears a red-purple callus just past the apex of the column. Both the column and the ovary have additional red-purple spots.
