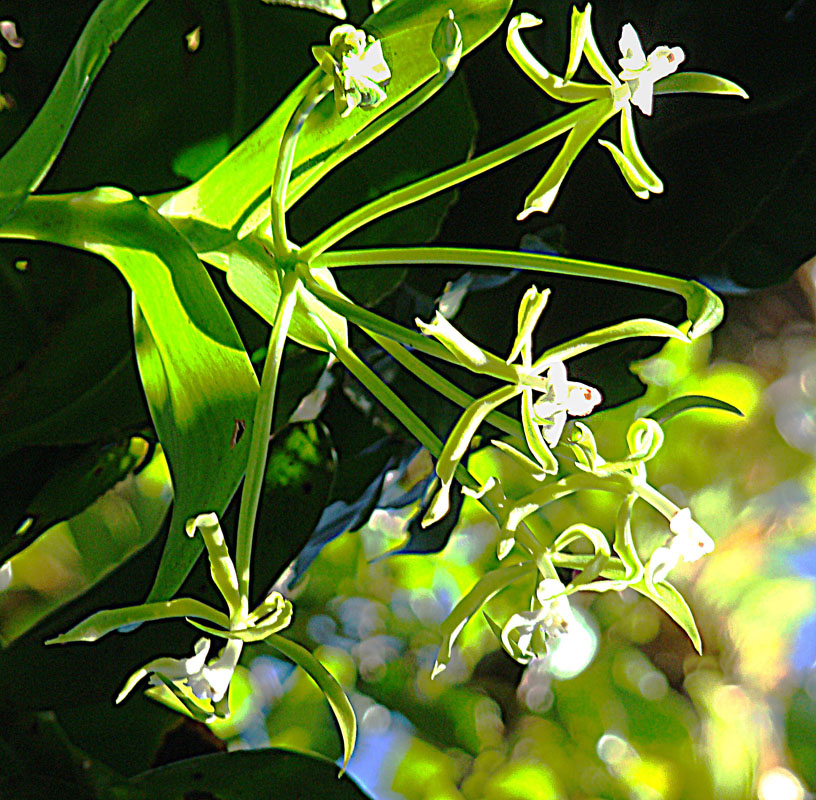

Scientific classification
- Kingdom: Plantae
- Clade: Tracheophytes
- Clade: Angiosperms
- Clade: Monocots
- Order: Asparagales
- Family: Orchidaceae
- Subfamily: Epidendroideae
- Genus: Epidendrum
- Subgenus: Epidendrum subg. Spathium
- Species: E. lacustre

Binomial name
- Epidendrum lacustre Lindl.

Synonyms
- Epidendrum leucochilum Lindl. nom. illeg.; Epidendrum obesumAmes

= Epidendrum lacustre =

Species of plant

Epidendrum lacustre (the "lake Epidendrum) is a sympodial orchid which is known to grow both epiphytically and lithophytically in the cloud forests and rainforests of Colombia, Costa Rica, Ecuador, Nicaragua, Peru and Venezuela at altitudes ranging from 1.2—2.5 km. The type of this species was found growing "on half-submerged rotten trees" in a Venezuelan marsh at an altitude of 2.4 km.

== Description ==
E. lacustre was placed in the subgenus E. subg. Spathium by Reichenbach; as is typical of plants in this subgenus, E. lacustre stems are unswollen and covered by sheathes which bear distichous leaves on the upper part of the stem, and end in one or more apical spathes, through which the inflorescence erupts. E. lacustre stems grow to 1.2 m tall. The leaves are broad and obtuse, to 21 cm long by 7 cm wide. The .3—.4 m long peduncle grows from a double, scimitar-shaped spathe, and bears the large (to 8 cm across) flowers near the end in an almost umbellate raceme. The 12 cm pedicel is four times the length of the ovary. The widely open green sepals and petals are linear with pointed tips. The white lip is adnate to the column to its apex, nearly cordate where it diverges from the column, either barely divided into three lobes or undivided, and pointed at the distal end. The callus consists of two pointed lumps just beyond the column, separated by a 4 cm long raised keel.
