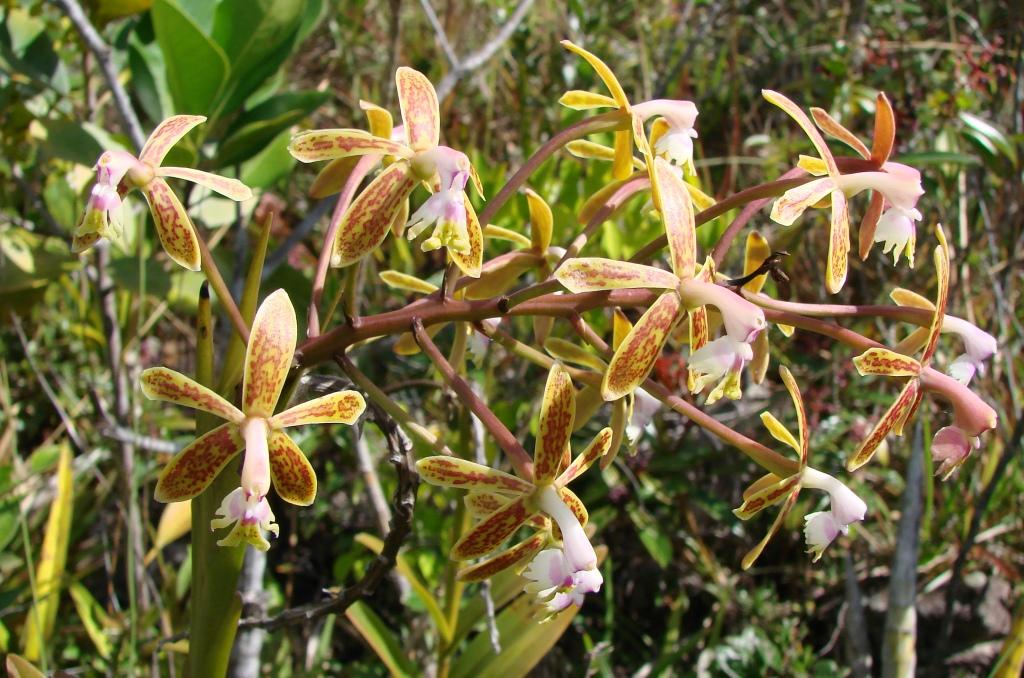

Scientific classification
- Kingdom: Plantae
- Clade: Tracheophytes
- Clade: Angiosperms
- Clade: Monocots
- Order: Asparagales
- Family: Orchidaceae
- Subfamily: Epidendroideae
- Genus: Epidendrum
- Subgenus: Epidendrum subg. Spathium
- Species: E. cristatum

Binomial name
- Epidendrum cristatum Ruiz & Pav.

Synonyms
- Epidendrum alexandri Schltr.; Epidendrum bathyschistum Schltr.; Epidendrum calliferum Lem.; Epidendrum hexadactylum Barb.Rodr.; Epidendrum longovarium Barb.Rodr.; Epidendrum raniferum Lindl.; Epidendrum raniferum var. hexadactylum (Barb.Rodr.) Cogn.; Epidendrum raniferum var. lofgrenii Cogn.; Epidendrum raniferum var. lutescens Lindl. ex Broadway; Epidendrum raniferum var. luteum Lindl.; Epidendrum raniferum var. obtusilobum Cogn.; Epidendrum tigrinum Sessé & Moc.; Epidendrum validum Schltr.

= Epidendrum cristatum =

Species of orchid

Epidendrum cristatumRuiz & Pav. (1789) (the "comb Epidendrum") is a species of orchid in the family Orchidaceae. It is known to grow both terrestrially and epiphytically at altitudes near 1 km in the Neotropics from Mexico and Belize down through Brazil, as well as Trinidad.

== Description ==
Epidendrum cristaum is an unusually large reed-stemmed Epidendrum, growing up to 8 m tall. As with other members of the subgenus E. subg. Spathium, the stems of E. cristatum are un-swollen and covered by close, tubular sheathes which bear distichous, somewhat leathery, lanceolate leaves (up to 3 cm long by 4 cm wide) on the upper part of the stem. The terminal paniculate inflorescence grows through several enlarged spathes, arranged in a fan, which cover the peduncle. The yellow-green flowers often have purple-brown markings. The oblong convex obtuse sepals can grow up to 2.8 cm long, slightly longer than the linear petals. The lip is adnate to the column to its apex with a shape that resembles a comb.

The diploid chromosome number of E. cristatum has been determined as 2n = 40, the haploid chromosome number as n = 20.

== Synonymy and homonymy ==
The synonym Epidendrum tigrinum Sessé & Moç. (1894) is a homonym of Epidendrum tigrinum Linden ex Lindl. (1846), which has been renamed Prosthechea tigrina.
