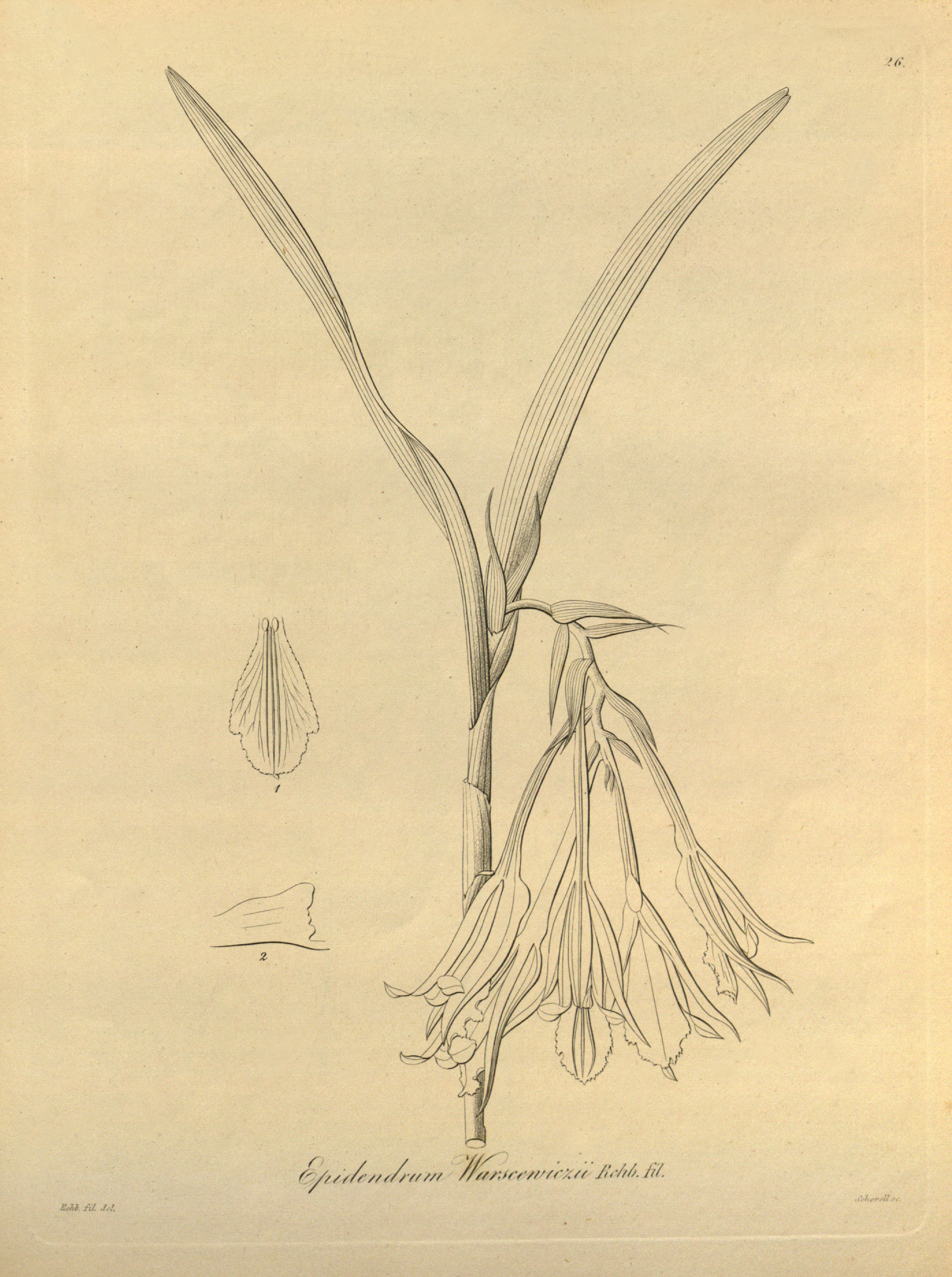

Scientific classification
- Kingdom: Plantae
- Clade: Tracheophytes
- Clade: Angiosperms
- Clade: Monocots
- Order: Asparagales
- Family: Orchidaceae
- Subfamily: Epidendroideae
- Genus: Epidendrum
- Subgenus: Epidendrum subg. Amphiglottium
- Section: Epidendrum sect. Schistochila
- Subsection: Epidendrum subsect. Integra
- Species: E. warszewiczii

Binomial name
- Epidendrum warszewiczii Rchb.f. (1852)

= Epidendrum warszewiczii =

Species of orchid

Epidendrum warszewiczii is a species of orchid.
