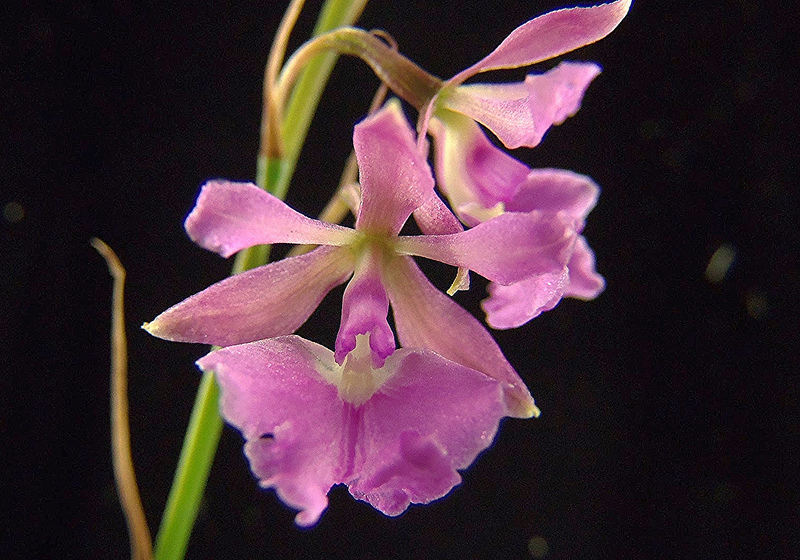

Scientific classification
- Kingdom: Plantae
- Clade: Tracheophytes
- Clade: Angiosperms
- Clade: Monocots
- Order: Asparagales
- Family: Orchidaceae
- Subfamily: Epidendroideae
- Genus: Epidendrum
- Subgenus: Epidendrum subg. Amphiglottium
- Section: Epidendrum sect. Schistochila
- Subsection: Epidendrum subsect. Integra
- Species: E. campestre

Binomial name
- Epidendrum campestre Jacq. (1760)

= Epidendrum campestre =

Species of orchid

Epidendrum campestre, the savannah epidendrum, is a rupicolous, sympodial orchid of the genus Epidendrum, with claviculate pseudobulbs up to 10 cm (3.9 in) tall, which bear three narrow leathery linear-lanceolate leaves up to 10 cm (3.9 in) in length. The inflorescence arises from the apex of the pseudobulb, and bears up to ten flowers in the spring. The flowers are 1 cm (0.39 in) in diameter, with lilac-pink perianth segments: the lateral sepals are falcate. The tetralobate lip is adnate to the column to its end, lacks any fringe whatsoever, and has a white callus.
