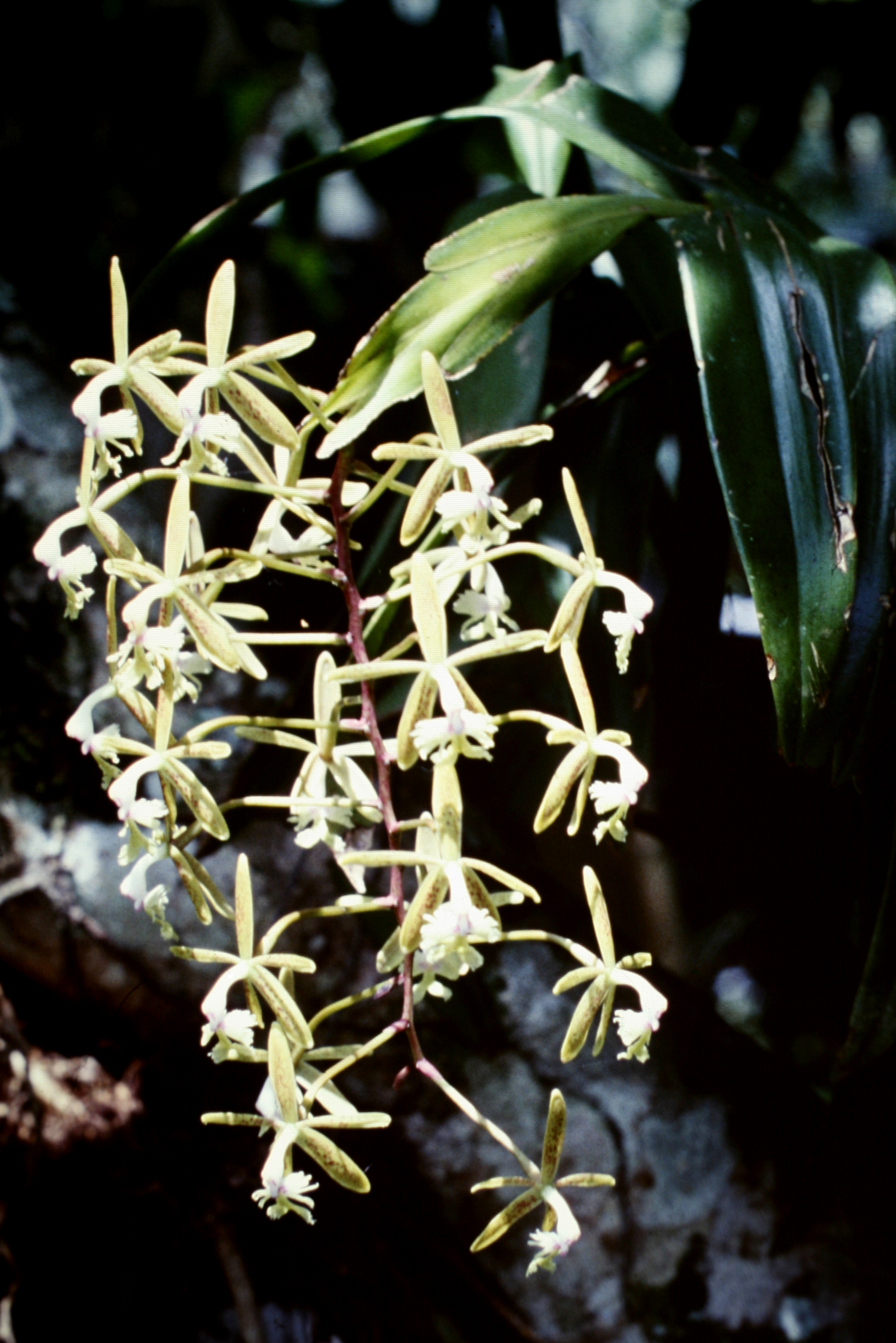
- E. cristatum showing inflorescence erupting from large spathes

Scientific classification
- Kingdom: Plantae
- Clade: Tracheophytes
- Clade: Angiosperms
- Clade: Monocots
- Order: Asparagales
- Family: Orchidaceae
- Subfamily: Epidendroideae
- Genus: Epidendrum
- Subgenus: Epidendrum subg. Spathium; Lindl.

= Epidendrum subg. Spathium =

Subgenus of orchids

John Lindley published Epidendrum subg. Spathium of the Orchidaceae. According to Lindley's diagnosis, the E. subg. Spathium is recognizable by is sympodial habit with individual stems being slender (without any tendency to form pseudobulbs) and covered by the bases of the distichous leaves, by the lip of the flower being adnate to the column to its apex, and by the inflorescence emerging from at least one spathe, similar to nearly all members of the genus Cattleya as understood in the year 2000 (sensu MM). Reichenbach recognized 52 species in this subgenus, of which Kew accepts 48 (page numbers refer to Reichenbach 1861):

- E. amplexicaule Lindl. 1853 (p. 370)
- E. acutissimum Lindl. 1853 (pp. 362–363)
- E. adenoglossum Lindl. 1841 (p. 361)
- E. alpicola Rchb.f. & Warsz. Bonplandia(Hannover)2:110(1854) (p. 366). Kew calls this E. alpicola, and accepts it thus. Bonplandia p. 110 says Epidendrum alpicolum.
- E. anthoceros Linden & Rchb.f. 1854 (p. 366)
- E. armeniacum Lindl. 1836 (p. 367)
- E. bivalve Lindl. 1853 (p. 365)
- E. brachyglossum Lindl. 1844 (p. 362)
- E. brevivenium Lindl. 1853 (p. 363)
- E. clowesii Bateman ex Lindl. 1844 (p. 373)
- E. cnemidophorum Lindl. 1853 (p. 372)
- E. cornutum Lindl. 1841 (pp. 365–366)
- E. cristatum Ruiz & Pav. 1793 (p. 372 as E. raniferum Lindl. 1831 & E. raniferum var. luteum Lindl. 1853
- E. cylindraceum Lindl. 1844 (p. 363)
- E. cylindrostachys Rchb.f. & Warsz. 1854 (p. 365)
- E. discoidale Lindl. 1853(p. 372)
- E. excisum Lindl. 1844 (pp. 370–371)
- E. ferrugineum Ruiz & Pav. 1798 (p. 364 as E. carneum Lindl. 1846 & (p. 364 as E. trinitatis Lindl. 1840
- E. friderici-guilielmi Rchb.f. & Warsz. 1854 (p. 365)
- E. geminiflorum Kunth 1816 (p. 368)
- E. glossoceras Rchb.f. & Warsz. 1854 (p. 366)
- E. harrisoniae Hook. 1833 (p. 373)
- E. heterodoxum Rchb.f. 1854 (p. 362)
- E. klotzscheanum Rchb.f. 1850 (pp. 366–367)
- E. lacustre Lindl. 1853 (p. 360)
- E. lagotis Rchb.f. 1855 (p. 367)
- E. longiflorum Kunth 1816 (p. 360), (p. 360-361 as E. spectatissimum Rchb.f. 1855) & (p. 360 as E. leucochilum Klotzach. 1843)
- E. mancum Lindl. 1844 (p. 361)
- E. megagastrium Lindl. 1853 (pp 368–369)
- E. mesomicron Lindl. 1853 (p. 370)
- E. modestum Rchb.f. & Warsz. 1854 (p. 371)
- E. ochriodes Lindl. 1853 (p. 371)
- E. parviflorum Ruiz & Pav. 1798 (p. 367)
- E. peperomia Rchb.f. 1854 (p. 368) & (p. 368 as E. porpax Rchb.f.)
- E. raphidophorum Lindl. 1853 (p. 371)
- E. ruizianum Steud. 1840 (pp. 371–372 as E. spathaceum Lindl. 1841)
- E. sanderi A.D.Hawkes 1957 (pp. 360–361 as E. grandiflorum Lindl. 1841 nom. illeg. )
- E. sarcochilum Linden & Rchb.f. 1854 (p. 363)
- E. sarcodes Lindl. 1853 (p. 362)
- E. schlimii Rchb.f. 1850 (p. 361)
- E. scutella Lindl. 1844 (p. 367)
- E. sinuosum Lindl. 1853 (p. 363)
- E. tenax Rchb.f. 1854 (pp. 367–368)
- E. tovarense Rchb.f. 1850 (p. 370)
- E. ventricosum Lindl. 1841 (p. 361)
- E. viridibrunneum Rchb.f. 1861 (p. 368)
- E. xantholeucum Rchb.f. 1850 (p. 373)

In 2005, Hágsater & Soto designated the species Epidendrum adenoglossum as the lectotype of Epidendrum subgenus Spathium.
