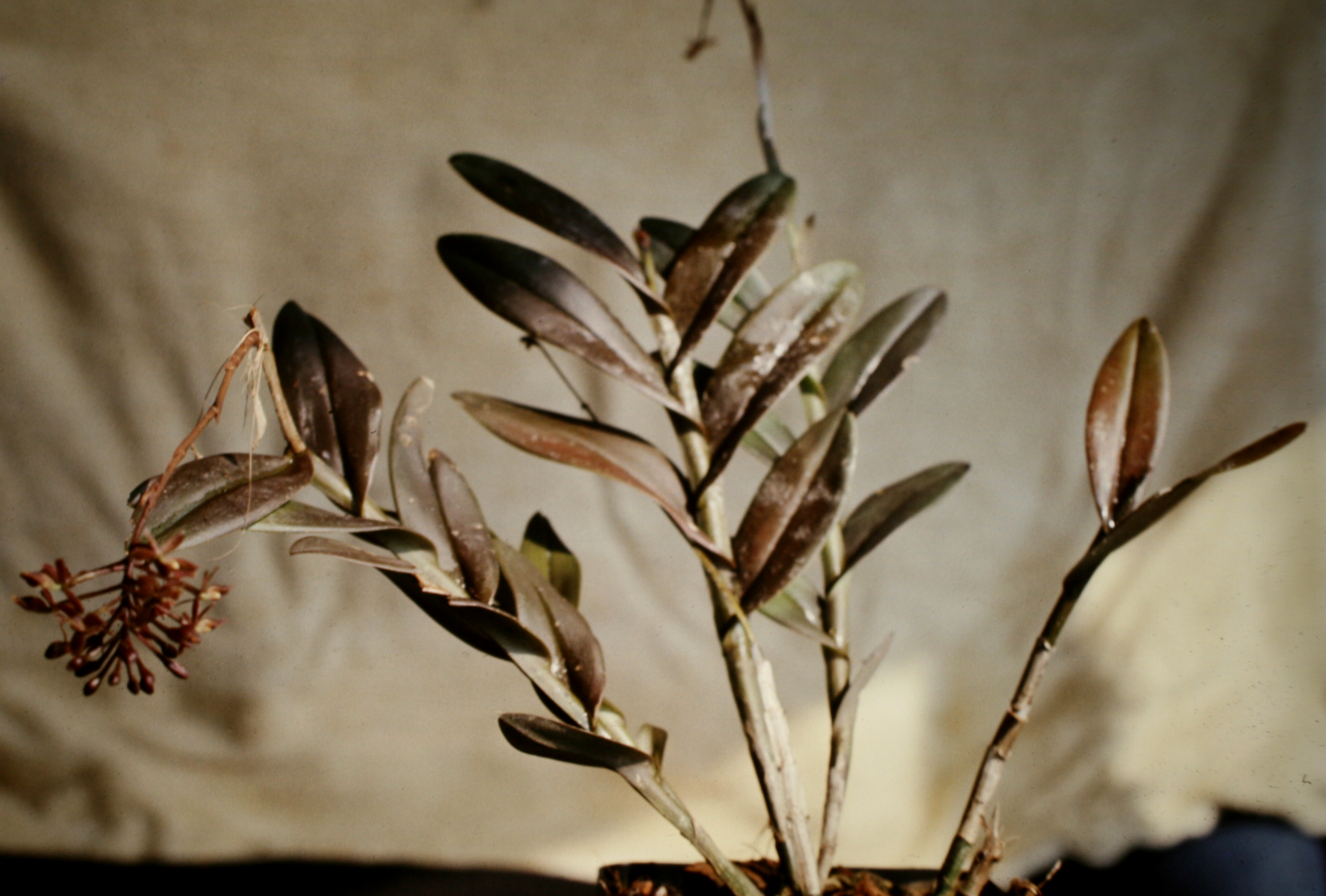
- an Epidendrum anceps plant from Suriname

Scientific classification
- Kingdom: Plantae
- Clade: Tracheophytes
- Clade: Angiosperms
- Clade: Monocots
- Order: Asparagales
- Family: Orchidaceae
- Subfamily: Epidendroideae
- Genus: Epidendrum
- Subgenus: Epidendrum subg. Amphiglottium
- Section: Epidendrum sect. Schistochila
- Subsection: Epidendrum subsect. Integra

= Epidendrum subsect. Integra =

Group of orchids

Integra is a subsection of the section Schistochila of the subgenus Amphiglotium (Lindl.) of the genus Epidendrum of the Orchidaceae (orchid family). Like the other subsections of Schistochila, Integra plants are sympodial orchids with no tendency to produce pseudobulbs. They bear a terminal inflorescence with a peduncle covered for most of its length with close, thin, imbricate sheaths, and terminating in a raceme. This subsection differs from the other two in that the margins of the trilobate lip are not lacerate, fringed, or denticulate. In 1861, Reichenbach listed fifteen separate species in this subsection. Some of these names are now recognized as synonyms

- E. anceps Jacq. (1763) as E. fuscatum Sw. (p. 385-386)
- E. anisatum Lex. (1825) (p. 385). Also as E. gladiatum Lindl. (p. 384-385)
- E. campestre Lindl. (1844) (pp. 386–387)
- E. centropetalum Rchb.f. (1852) (p. 388)
- E. fruticosum Pav. ex Lindl. (1831) (p. 384)
- E. lima Lindl. (1853) (p. 387)
- E. orchidiflorum Salzmann ex. Lindl. (1831) (p. 385)
- E. ovalifolium Lindl. (1831) (p. 386)
- E. paranthicum Rchb.f. (1852) (pp. 387–388)
- E. patens Sw. (1806) (p. 384)
- E. saxatile Lindl (1841) as E. weddelii Lindl. (1853) (p. 387)
- E. smaragdinum Lindl. (1838)(p. 386)
- E. vandifolium Lindl. (1849) (p. 387)
- E. warszewiczii Rchb.f. (1852) (p. 387)
