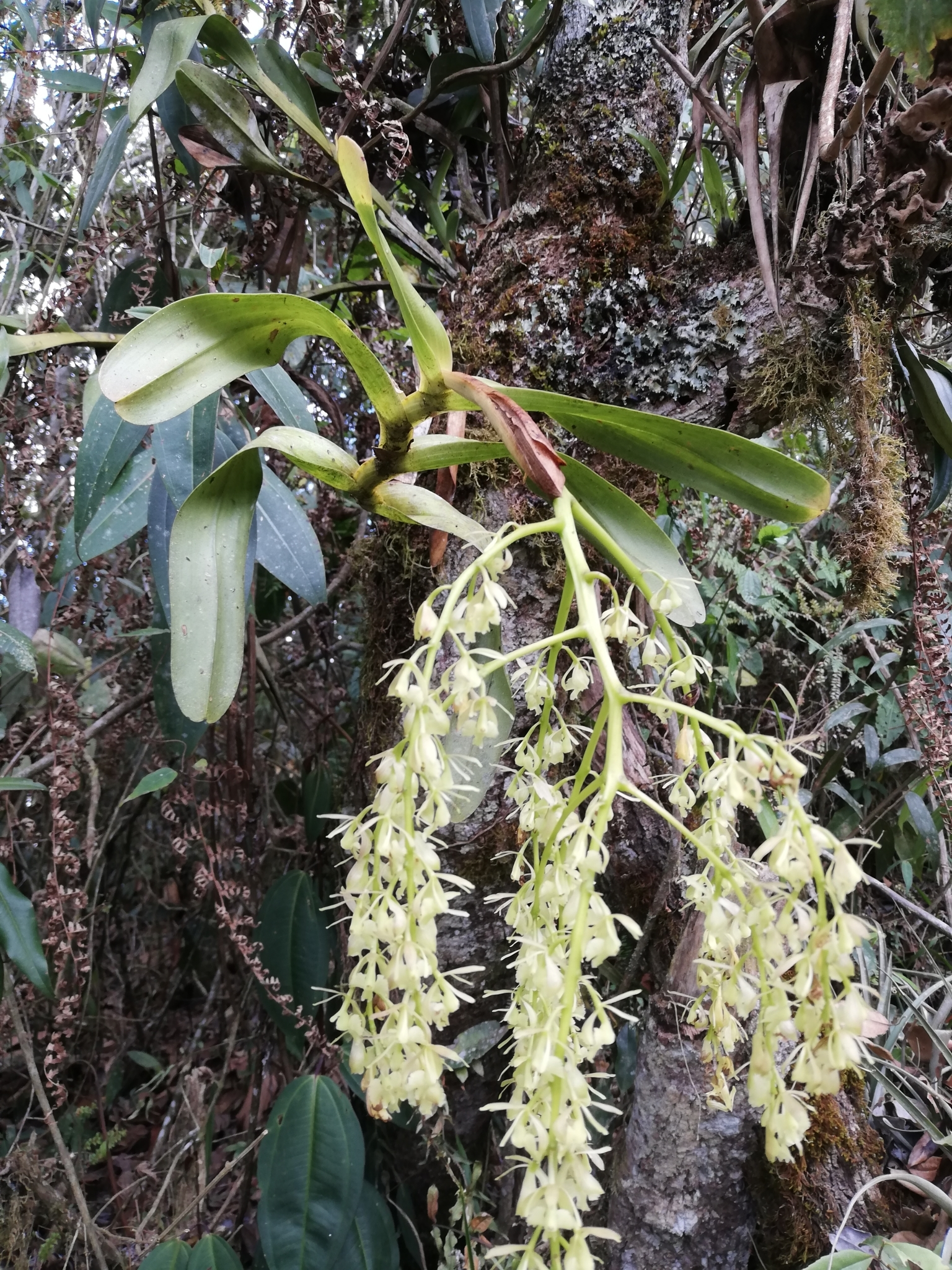

Scientific classification
- Kingdom: Plantae
- Clade: Tracheophytes
- Clade: Angiosperms
- Clade: Monocots
- Order: Asparagales
- Family: Orchidaceae
- Subfamily: Epidendroideae
- Genus: Epidendrum
- Subgenus: Epidendrum subg. Spathium
- Species: E. excisum

Binomial name
- Epidendrum excisum Lindl.

= Epidendrum excisum =

Species of orchid

Epidendrum excisum is a species of orchid known to grow both epiphytically and terrestrially on steep rocky banks in mountainous regions of Colombia, Ecuador, Peru, and Venezuela. It has been reported at altitudes from 2.4 km to 2.8 km.

== Description ==
The flattened stems grow to 0.9 m tall and are covered by the basal sheathes of the broad, oblong, leathery leaves. The long base of the paniculate inflorescence erupts from two short, broad spathes at the apex of the stem. The yellow flowers have filiform to linear petals, and obovate sepals, the lateral sepals being scoop-shaped. The lateral lobes of the trilobate lip have a crenulate to erose margin, and give the lip (where it diverges from the column) a heart-shape. The central lobe is divided into three short rounded lobes at its end: the central one narrow and bent downward, the lateral ones slightly longer, pointing outward and bent upward.

== Synonymy ==
E. excisum var. grandiflorum was recognized in Reichenbach, 1861, with generally larger flowers, and occasionally, with "great horizontal cucullate spathes." According to Kew, this variety is a synonym for the species.
