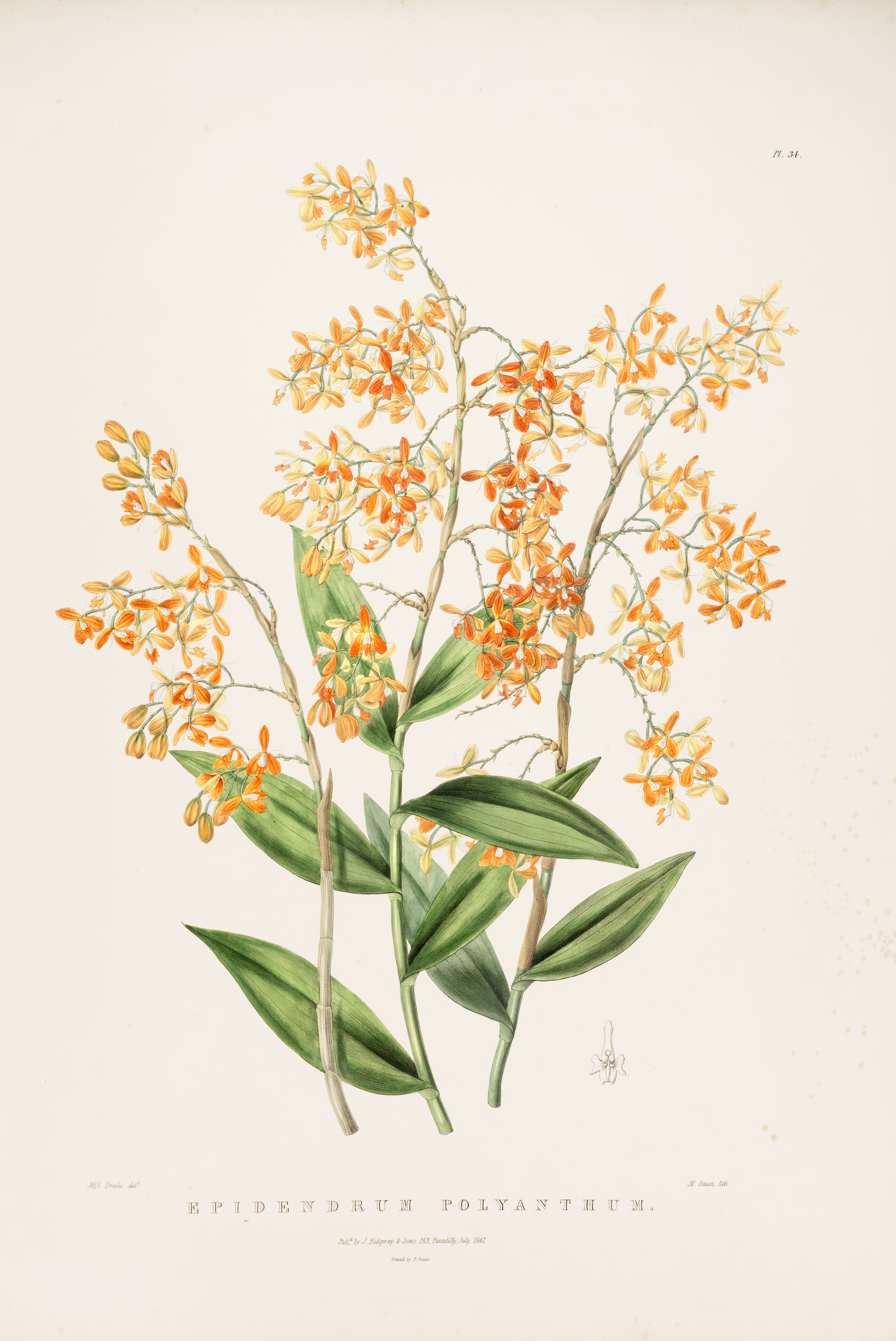

Scientific classification
- Kingdom: Plantae
- Clade: Tracheophytes
- Clade: Angiosperms
- Clade: Monocots
- Order: Asparagales
- Family: Orchidaceae
- Subfamily: Epidendroideae
- Genus: Epidendrum
- Subgenus: Epidendrum subg. Amphiglottium
- Section: Epidendrum sect. Polycladia
- Species: E. polyanthum

Binomial name
- Epidendrum polyanthum Lindl. (1831)

Synonyms
- Epidendrum polystachyum Pav. ex Lindl. (1831); Epidendrum bisetum Lindl. (1841); Epidendrum funiferum C.Morren (1848); Epidendrum colorans Klotzsch (1851); Epidendrum lansbergii Regel (1855); Epidendrum glumibracteum Rchb.f. (1863); Maxillaria glumibracteum (Rchb.f.) Hemsl. (1884); Epidendrum verrucipes Schltr. (1918); Epidendrum quinquelobum Schltr. (1923); Epidendrum hondurense Ames (1933)

= Epidendrum polyanthum =

Species of orchid

Epidendrum polyanthum (gloss: "many flowers upon a tree") is a species of orchid in the genus Epidendrum.
