= Epidendrum miserrimum =

Scientific classification
- Kingdom: Plantae
- Clade: Tracheophytes
- Clade: Angiosperms
- Clade: Monocots
- Order: Asparagales
- Family: Orchidaceae
- Subfamily: Epidendroideae
- Genus: Epidendrum
- Subgenus: Epidendrum subg. Amphiglottium
- Section: Epidendrum sect. Holochila
- Species: E. miserrimum

Binomial name
- Epidendrum miserrimum Rchb.f.

Synonyms
- Jacquiniella miserrima (Rchb.f.) Stehlé; Epidendrum poaeforme Schltr. Epidendrum poiforme Schltr. Microepidendrum miserrimum (Rchb.f.) Brieger

Species of orchid

Epidendrum miserrimum ("the most miserable Epidendrum") is a small sympodial epiphytic orchid native to northern South America, the West Indies and Central America at altitudes as low as 0.7 km and as high as 1.2 km.

== Description ==
Reichenbach describes E. miserrimum as poorer than E. carinatum. The weedy stems grow to 10 cm tall and are surrounded by imbricating foliaceous sheathes. The acute, lanceolate leaves grow up to 5 cm long. The few flowered racemose inflorescence grows from the apex of the stem, and is covered with imbricating sheathes. The floral bract is longer than the tiny, green flowers. The sepals are 4 mm long and do not open fully; the linear petals are 3 mm long. The 3 mm long lip, pointed at the end, features two rotund shoulders, nearly 1 mm broad, rolled into a nearly complete tube in front of the column apex (Dodson & Dodson 1989 describe the lip as trilobate). The anther bears four pollinia.
