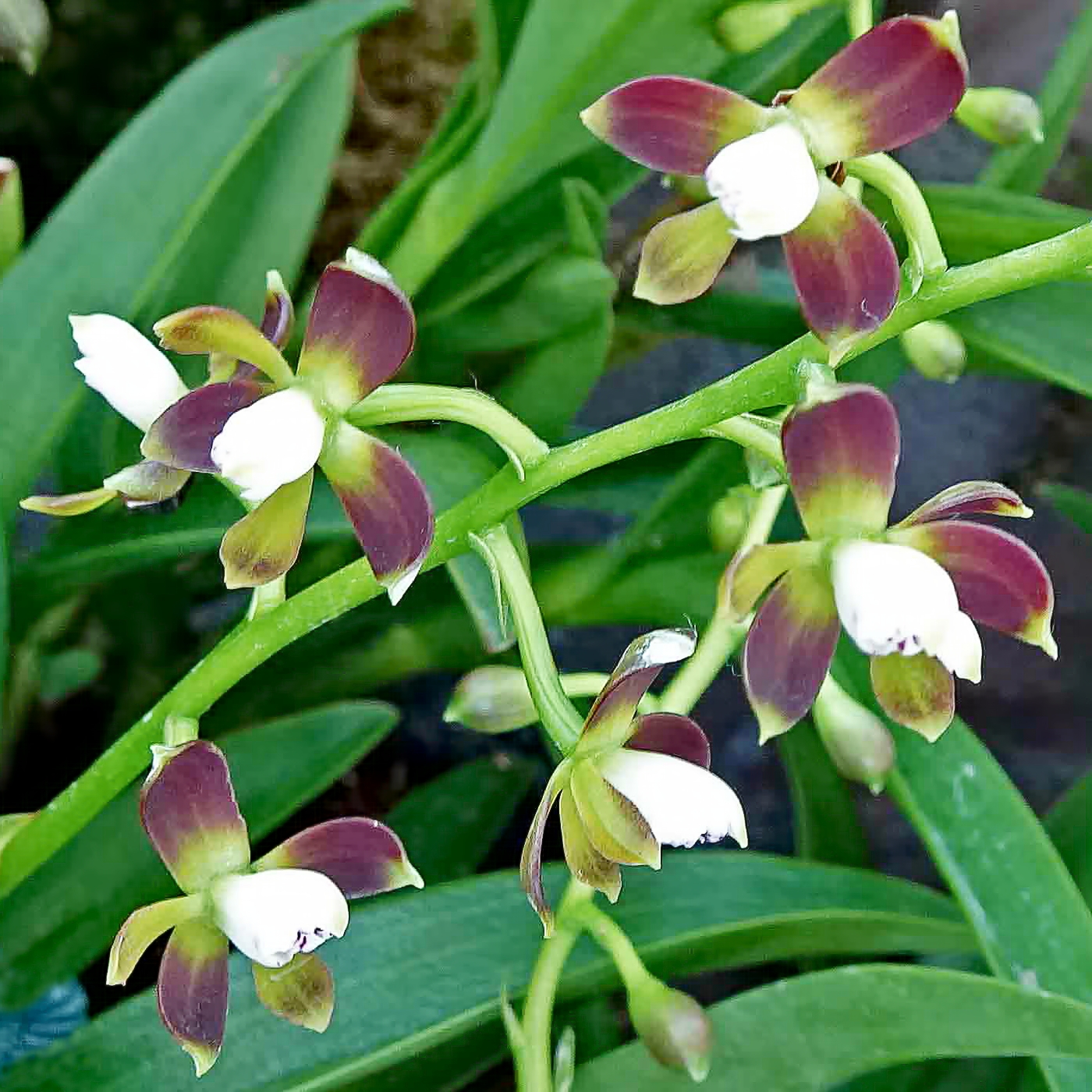

Scientific classification
- Kingdom: Plantae
- Clade: Embryophytes
- Clade: Tracheophytes
- Clade: Spermatophytes
- Clade: Angiosperms
- Clade: Monocots
- Order: Asparagales
- Family: Orchidaceae
- Subfamily: Epidendroideae
- Genus: Epidendrum
- Subgenus: Epidendrum subg. Spathium
- Species: E. mancum

Binomial name
- Epidendrum mancum Lindl. (1844)

= Epidendrum mancum =

Species of orchid

Epidendrum mancum is an epiphytic orchid that grows in the tropical low elfin cloud forests of Ecuador and Amazonas, Peru, at altitudes of 2–3 km.

== Description ==
E. mancum exhibits a sympodial growth habit, with flattened stems nearly covered by the basal sheaths of the three to four oblong retuse leaves, and a terminal racemose inflorescence which erupts from a large spathe, as is typical of the subgenus E. subg. Spathium. The small, fleshy, non-resupinate flowers range in color from green to yellowish-green or orange, frequently with red-brown markings which may nearly cover the perianth segments. The sepals are subrotund-oblong, and apically very obtuse. The petals are spatulate with very obtuse and concave apices. The small lip is adnate to the column nearly to its apex, is concave at its apex, and has a callus of three low ridges. From peduncle to column apex is approximately 1 cm; the lip protrudes an additional 2 mm.
