= George Barker (benefactor) =

George Barker FRS
- Born: 1776
- Died: 6 December 1845
- Occupations: Solicitor; benefactor
- Known for: Founding the Birmingham Philosophical Society

George Barker (1776–1845) was a solicitor in, and a benefactor to, Birmingham, once a town in Warwickshire (and now a city in the West Midlands county), in England. He was also a street commissioner there, and a governor of King Edward's School.

As a conservative, he campaigned unsuccessfully against the incorporation of Birmingham, which was nonetheless enacted in October 1838.

He devoted a large portion of his time both to scientific pursuits and to benevolent and social enterprises. He exerted himself with great energy to extend the advantages of the General Hospital, on behalf of which he was one of the chief promoters of, and a long-standing chairman of the committee of, the Birmingham Triennial Music Festival, until ill health forced his retirement in 1843. He was the founder of the now defunct Birmingham Philosophical Institution, and by his lectures on chemistry gave a considerable impetus to certain special manufactures. From the first he took a special interest in the inventions of James Watt and Matthew Boulton, becoming friends with both men. It was chiefly owing to his exertions that an Act of Parliament was obtained for the London and Birmingham Railway. In recognition of his scientific achievements he was elected a Fellow of the Royal Society in 1839. He died on 6 December 1845 at his home in the city's Springfield district.

== Botany ==
Barker was an enthusiastic and competent botanist. Species named by him include:

- Epidendrum blepharistes
- Oncidium incurvum

The standard author abbreviation Barker is used to indicate this person as the author when citing a botanical name.

== Bust ==
In 1844, following Barker's retirement from the Music Festival committee, £560 was raised by public subscription. This was used to buy him a gift of silverware, and to pay for a bust in marble, by Peter Hollins. The latter was exhibited at the Birmingham Society of Artists in 1844, where a reviewer from The Art Journal saw it and was compelled to write:

Intended to be placed in the board-room of the General Hospital, being part of a public testimonial to commemorate his services to the institution and to the town of Birmingham. On entering what is called the Middle-room, the first object that fixes our attention is this very quiet and classic bust by Mr. Hollins. We do not know Mr. Barker, but, if this bust be a truthful likeness, he furnishes a good modern example of the Voltaire style of physiognomy. The carriage and bearing of the figure are calm and composed; and, on more careful examination, we are surprised to find ourselves captivated, and even enthralled, by a whole, the parts of which seem studiously to avoid rather than to encourage observance. The artist has consulted the models of antiquity, and has communicated to his work grace and force, with repose and ease, the combination of which constitute perfection in the art of sculpture, and will keep this work and the master in the estimation of posterity. If Mr. Hollins had not already deserved well of his native town by other distinguished works in sculpture, and by his activity and zeal in the establishment and maintenance of a Midland School of Art, this work alone would have associated his name with the recollections of Florence and Birmingham.

The bust was subsequently placed in the General Hospital, and was later reported as being with a now-defunct firm of Birmingham solicitors, Lee, Crowder and Co, with which Barker was connected. It is now privately held.
