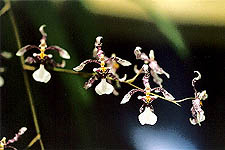

Scientific classification
- Kingdom: Plantae
- Clade: Tracheophytes
- Clade: Angiosperms
- Clade: Monocots
- Order: Asparagales
- Family: Orchidaceae
- Subfamily: Epidendroideae
- Genus: Oncidium
- Species: O. incurvum

Binomial name
- Oncidium incurvum Barker ex Lindl.

Synonyms
- Oncidium alboviolaceum A.Rich. & Galeotti; Oncidium incurvum var. album Rchb.f.

= Oncidium incurvum =

Species of orchid

Oncidium incurvum is a species of orchid endemic to Mexico (Veracruz to Chiapas).
