= Epidendrum cylindraceum =

Scientific classification
- Kingdom: Plantae
- Clade: Tracheophytes
- Clade: Angiosperms
- Clade: Monocots
- Order: Asparagales
- Family: Orchidaceae
- Subfamily: Epidendroideae
- Genus: Epidendrum
- Subgenus: Epidendrum subg. Spathium
- Species: E. cylindraceum

Binomial name
- Epidendrum cylindraceum Lindl.

Species of orchid

Epidendrum cylindraceum is a reed-stemmed Epidendrum of the Orchidaceae, native to Colombia, Ecuador, and Peru, where it has been reported at an altitude of 3.2 km.

== Description ==
Epidendrum cylindraceum stems are completely covered with tubular sheathes which bear one to two ovate-oblong leaves near the apex. The peduncle is clothed in two or three elongate herbaceous sheathes, arranged in a fan. The inflorescence is a dense raceme, up to 15 cm long by 5 cm in diameter. The rather small, non-resupinate, mostly white flowers have obovate acute sepals nearly 1 cm long that are rough on the outside, and linear petals. The deeply trilobate lip is adnate to the column to its apex: the small lateral lobes are sickle-shaped, with slight fringing on the proximal edge, and the much larger central lobe is kidney-shaped at its apex.
