= Epidendrum brevivenium =

Scientific classification
- Kingdom: Plantae
- Clade: Tracheophytes
- Clade: Angiosperms
- Clade: Monocots
- Order: Asparagales
- Family: Orchidaceae
- Subfamily: Epidendroideae
- Genus: Epidendrum
- Subgenus: Epidendrum subg. Spathium
- Species: E. brevivenium

Binomial name
- Epidendrum brevivenium Lindl.

Species of orchid

Epidendrum brevivenium is a species of Epidendrum Orchid native to Peru and the provinces of Pichincha, Napo, and Tungurahua in Ecuador at altitudes of 2.8 to 3.4 km.

== Description ==
The branched stems of this sympodial orchid climb on trees or rock cliffs, and produce roots from the nodes, similar to E. radicans. The stems are covered with sheaths, the bases of the distichous, oblong-obtuse leaves. The terminal inflorescence arises from an obtuse spathe and has a short peduncle clothed in distichous, imbricating sheathes below the raceme of light green flowers, 1–2 cm across. The sepals have three veins which do not reach the apex (hence brevivenium); the linear petals have only one. The lateral lobes of the trilobate lip appear to have deep, ragged cuts; the middle lobe divides into three parts at the apex.
