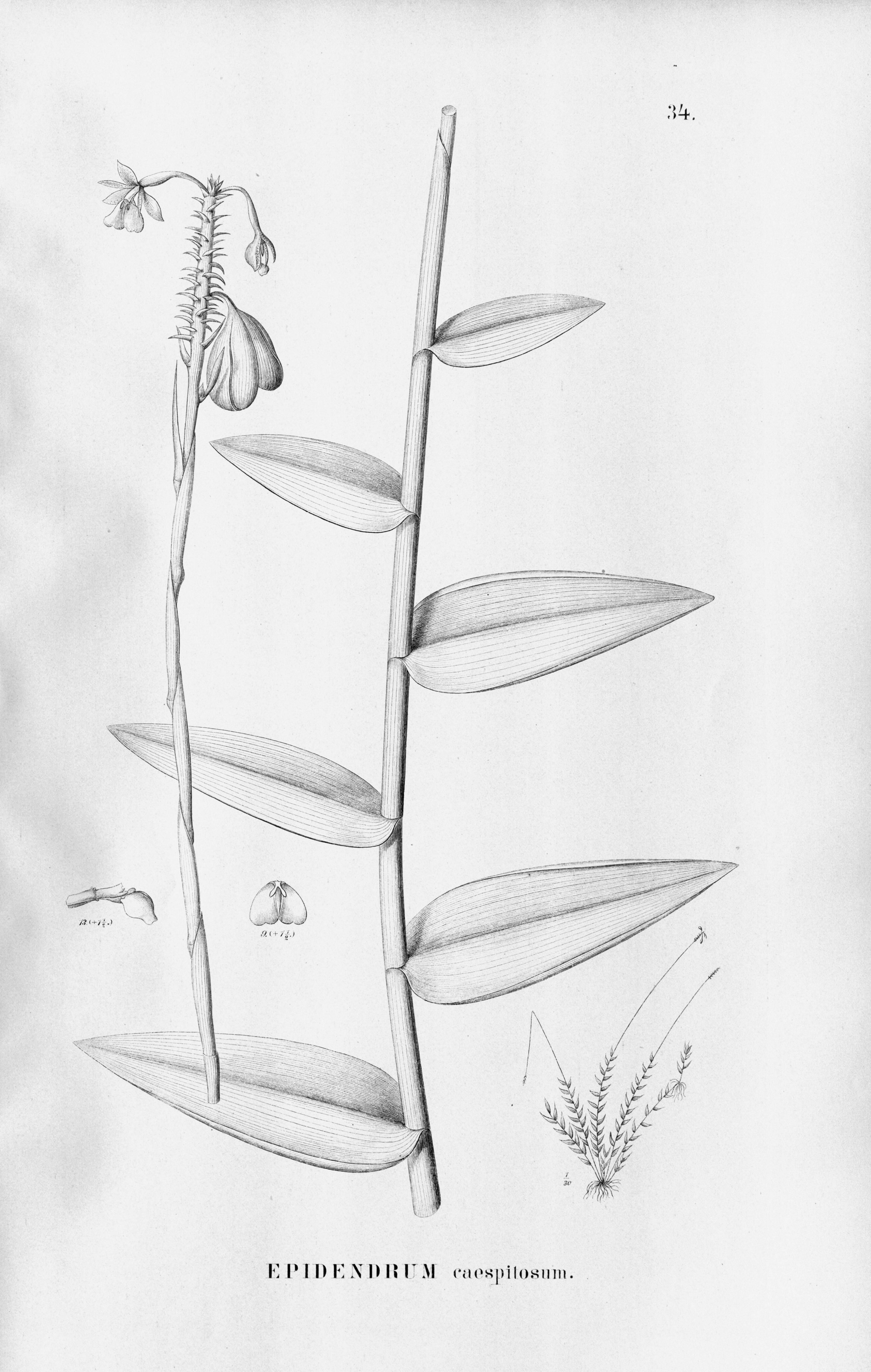
- Epidendrum orchidiflorum

Scientific classification
- Kingdom: Plantae
- Clade: Tracheophytes
- Clade: Angiosperms
- Clade: Monocots
- Order: Asparagales
- Family: Orchidaceae
- Subfamily: Epidendroideae
- Genus: Epidendrum
- Subgenus: Epidendrum subg. Amphiglottium
- Section: Epidendrum sect. Schistochila
- Subsection: Epidendrum subsect. Integra
- Species: E. orchidiflorum

Binomial name
- Epidendrum orchidiflorum Salzm. ex Lindl.

= Epidendrum orchidiflorum =

Species of orchid

Epidendrum orchidiflorum is a species of orchid of the genus Epidendrum.

== Description ==
E. orchidiflorum grows in sandy thickets in Bahia, Brazil, according to Reichenbach's reading of Salzmann, and flowers in February, growing in sandy bushy places near Macero, according to Reichenbach's reading of Gardner, 1421. The flat, coriaceous distichous leaves are ovate-oblong and obtuse. The stout, ~3 dm long, terminal peduncle is covered with rough imbricate sheathes and ends in a short raceme of green flowers. The dorsal sepal is obovate, and the lateral sepals are oblong. The two petals are linear-subcuneate. The subrotund lip has two calli at the base, and is tridentate at the apex; the middle tooth is smaller than the lateral teeth.

== Synonyms ==
- E. caespitosum Barb.Rodr. (1877) nom. illeg.
- E. huebneri Schltr. (1925)
- E. acrirachis Pabst (1955)
- E. garayanum A.D.Hawkes (1957) nom. illeg.
