= Epidendrum martianum =

Scientific classification
- Kingdom: Plantae
- Clade: Tracheophytes
- Clade: Angiosperms
- Clade: Monocots
- Order: Asparagales
- Family: Orchidaceae
- Subfamily: Epidendroideae
- Genus: Epidendrum
- Subgenus: Epidendrum subg. Amphiglottium
- Section: Epidendrum sect. Polycladia
- Species: E. martianum

Binomial name
- Epidendrum martianum Lindl.

Species of orchid

Epidendrum martianum is a rupicolous species of orchid of the genus Epidendrum. Reichenbach reported that this orchid with paniculate inflorescences grows on the plains near Villa Rica, Minas Gerais, Brazil.
