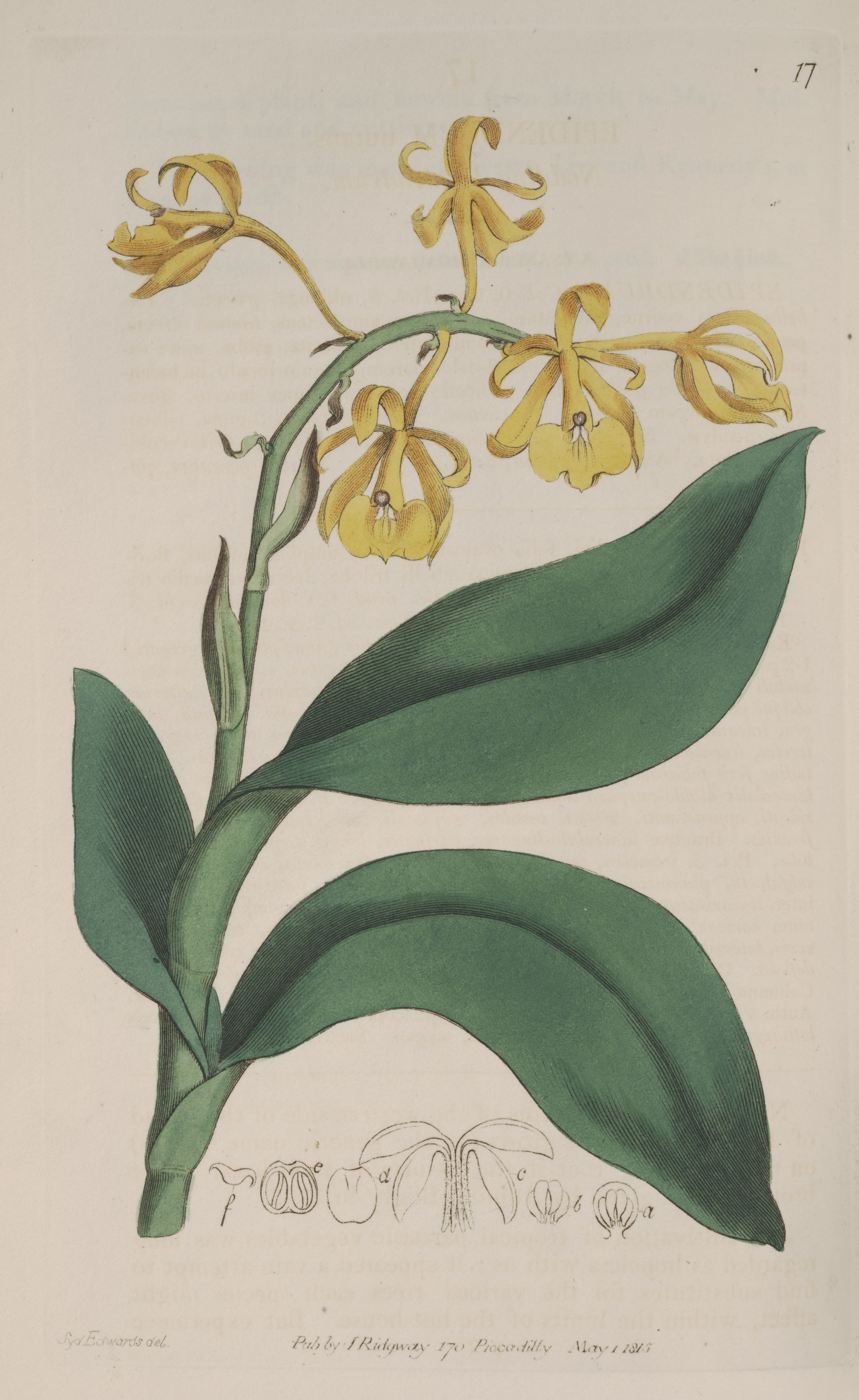

Conservation status
- Least Concern (IUCN 3.1)

Scientific classification
- Kingdom: Plantae
- Clade: Tracheophytes
- Clade: Angiosperms
- Clade: Monocots
- Order: Asparagales
- Family: Orchidaceae
- Subfamily: Epidendroideae
- Genus: Epidendrum
- Subgenus: Epidendrum subg. Amphiglottium
- Section: Epidendrum sect. Polycladia
- Species: E. nutans

Binomial name
- Epidendrum nutans Sw. (1788)

Synonyms
- Epidendrum tridentatum Fawc. (1895); Epidendrum nutans var. tridentatum Fawc. & Rendle (1911)

= Epidendrum nutans =

Species of orchid

Epidendrum nutans, the nodding epidendrum, is a species of orchid in the genus Epidendrum.
