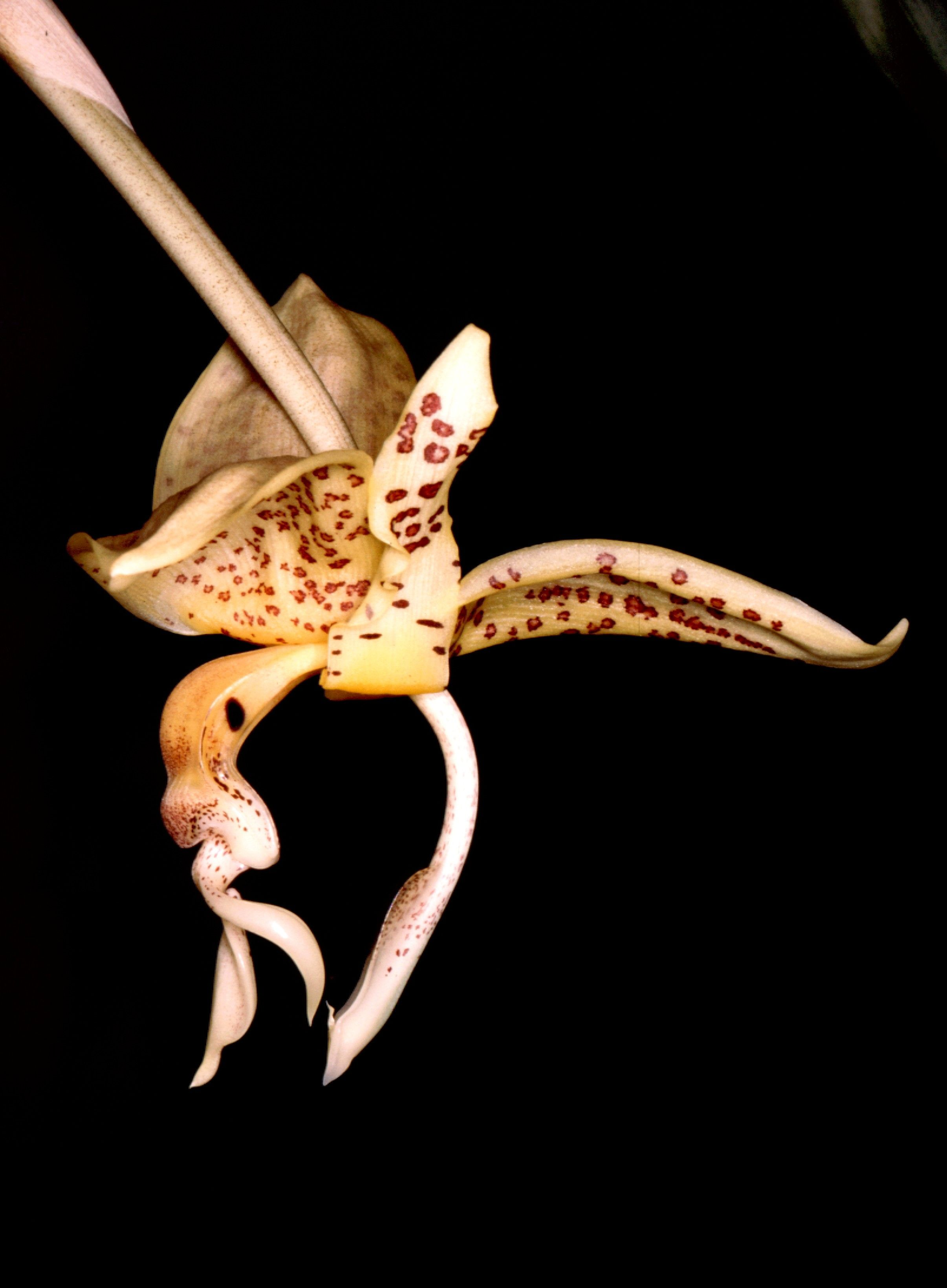
- Stanhopea oculata flower

Scientific classification
- Kingdom: Plantae
- Clade: Tracheophytes
- Clade: Angiosperms
- Clade: Monocots
- Order: Asparagales
- Family: Orchidaceae
- Subfamily: Epidendroideae
- Genus: Stanhopea
- Species: S. oculata

Binomial name
- Stanhopea oculata (Lodd.) Lindl.

Synonyms
- Ceratochilus oculatus Lodd. (basionym); Dendrobium grandiflorum Sw.; Stanhopea bucephalus Lindl.; Stanhopea lindleyi Zucc.; Stanhopea aurantia Lodd. ex P.N.Don; Stanhopea guttata Beer; Stanhopea guttata K.Koch; Stanhopea ornatissima Lem.; Stanhopea cymbiformis Rchb.f.; Epidendrum cornutum Sessé & Moç. (1894) nom. illeg.; Stanhopea minor Schltr.

= Stanhopea oculata =

Species of orchid

Stanhopea oculata (common name Toritos, or Little Bulls) is a species of orchid occurring from Mexico to Colombia and southeastern Brazil. It has very small seeds, only 0.000003 g weight.
