= Adnation =

Botanical term for the fusion of multiple whorls of a flower

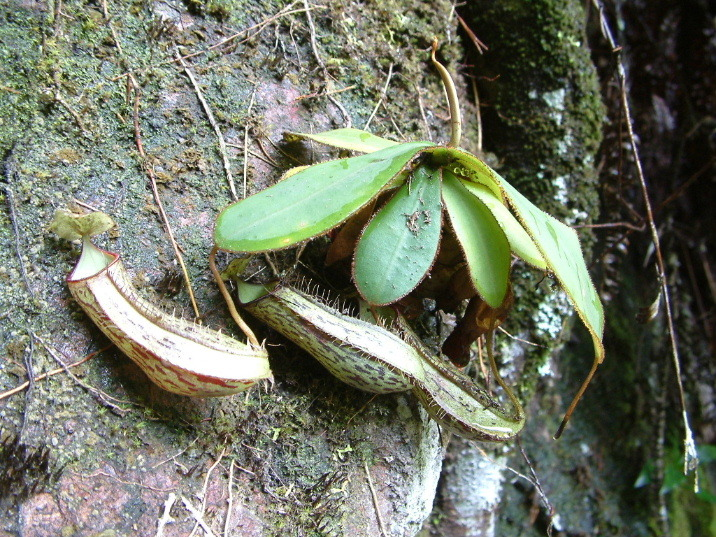
The tropical pitcher plant Nepenthes adnata is named for its adnate leaf bases

In botany, adnation is the fusion of two or more whorls of a flower, e.g. stamens to petals, within angiosperms (flowering plants). This is in contrast to connation, the fusion among a single whorl.

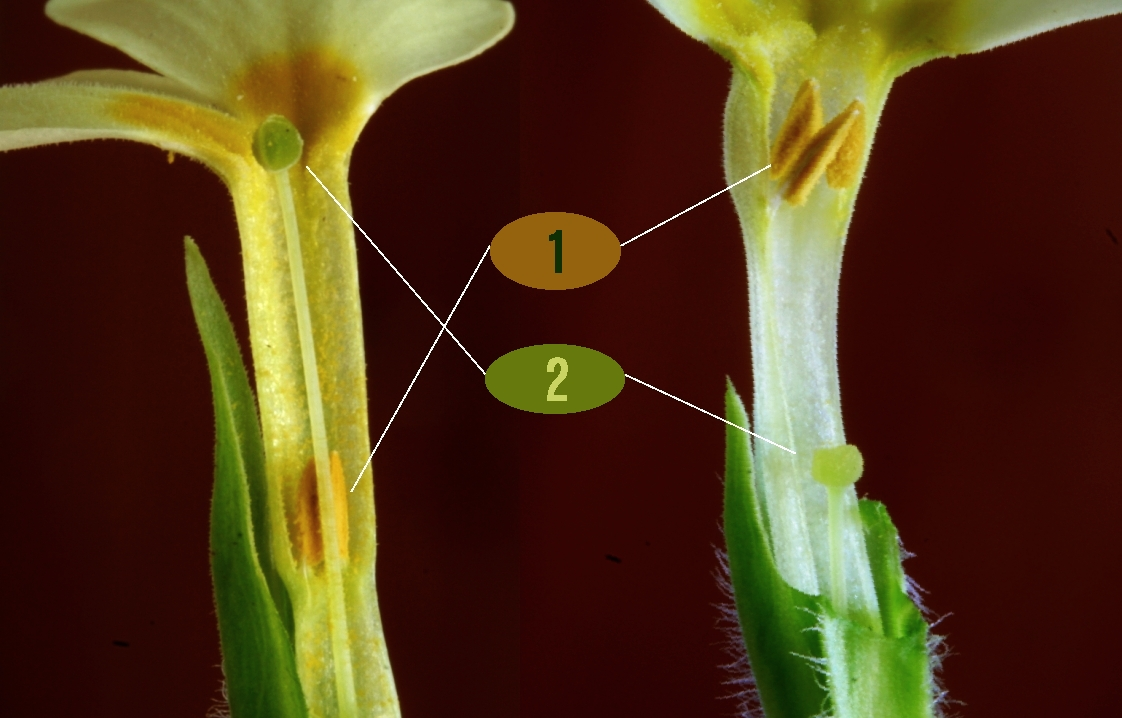
The stamens of Primula vulgaris are adnate to the corolla
