= C. falcata =

C. falcata may refer to:

- Coilostylis falcata, a synonym of the orchid species Epidendrum falcatum
- Cordania falcata, a trilobite species
- Crassula falcata, a plant species

== Synonyms ==
- Cassia falcata (disambiguation), a disambiguation page
