= Epidendrum subg. Aulizeum =

Scientific classification
- Kingdom: Plantae
- Clade: Tracheophytes
- Clade: Angiosperms
- Clade: Monocots
- Order: Asparagales
- Family: Orchidaceae
- Subfamily: Epidendroideae
- Genus: Epidendrum
- Subgenus: Epidendrum subg. Aulizeum; Lindl.

Subgenus of orchids

Epidendrum subgenus Aulizeum was raised from sectional status by Lindley in 1853. According to the Latin diagnosis, this taxon included those species of Epidendrum with a multi-lobate lip adnate to the column, with pseudobulbous stems, with the flowers sessile or born on racemes or panicles. In his further English description, Lindley stated that the species in this taxon have a horn-like stem which is only leafy at the end, and racemose inflorescences. In 1861, Reichenbach listed 32 species in this subgenus; of these, Kew recognizes 31 as separate species.

In 2004, Withner and Harding separated the eight species that Lindley had placed in E. subg. Aulizeum into the genus Coilostylis, a change that has not been widely accepted. Additionally, several species have been moved into other genera, leaving thirteen still in Epidendrum subgenus Aulizeum:

- Artorima erubescens (Lindl.) Dressler & G.E.Pollard (1971), listed by Reichenbach on p. 350 as E. erubescens
- Encyclia kermesina (Lindl.) P.Oriz (1995), listed by Reichenbach on p. 349 as E. kermesinum
- Encyclia parallela (Lindl.) P.Ortiz(1995), listed by Reichenbach on p. 351 as E. parallelum
- Epidendrum ciliare (L.) Withner & P.A.Harding (2004)139, listed by Reichenbach on p. 347
- Epidendrum coryophorum (Kunth) Rchb.f. (1861), listed by Reichenbach on (p. 347) as E. coriophorum
- Epidendrum falcatum (Lindl.) Withner & P.A.Harding (2004)143, listed by Reichenbach on p. 348
- Epidendrum jajense Rchb.f. (1854), listed by Reichenbach on p. 352
- Epidendrum miserum Lindl. (1841), listed by Reichenbach on p. 354 as E. pulchellum
- Epidendrum moritzi Rchb.f. (1850), listed by Reichenbach on pp. 350–351
- Epidendrum oerstedii Rchb.f. (1852), listed by Reichenbach on p. 348 as both E. costaricense and E. oerstedii.
- Epidendrum parvilabre Lindl. (1845), listed by Reichenbach on p. 351
- Epidendrum polystachyum Kunth (1816), listed by Reichenbach on p. 350.
- Epidendrum purpurascens Focke, listed by Reichenbach on p. 349 as E. clavatum.
- Epidendrum refractum Lindl. (1843), listed by Reichenbach on p. 354
- Epidendrum rupestre Lindl. (1841), listed by Reichenbach on p. 352
- Epidendrum saxatile Lindl. (1841), listed by Reichenbach on p. 352
- Epidendrum stramineum Lindl. (1853), listed by Reichenbach on p. 351
- Epidendrum tipuloideum Lindl.(1853), listed by Reichenbach on p. 350
- Epidendrum viviparum Lindl., listed by Reichenbach on pp. 348–349
- Epidendrum volutum Lindl. & Paxton (1852), listed by Reichenbach on p. 354
- Oestlundia luteorosea (A.Rich. & Galeotti) W.E.Higgins(2001), listed by Reichenbach on p. 347 as E. seriatum
- Prosthechea arminii (Rchb.f.) Withner & P.A.Harding(2004)254, listed by Reichenbach on p. 353 as E. arminii
- Prosthechea brachychila (Lindl.) W.E.Higgins (1998), listed by Reichenbach on pp. 352–353 as E. brachychilum
- Prosthechea concolor (Lex.) W.E.Higgins (1998), listed by Reichenbach on p. 352 as E. pruinosum
- Prosthechea grammatoglossa (Rchb.f.) W.E.Higgins (1998), listed by Reichenbach on p. 350 as E. grammatoglossum
- Prosthechea hartwegii (Lindl.) W.E.Higgins (1998), listed by Reichenbach on p. 354 as E. hartwegii
- Prosthechea lindenii (Lindl.) W.E.Higgins(1998), listed by Reichenbach on p. 353 as E. fallax
- Prosthechea pastoris (Lex.) Espejo & López-Ferr(2000), listed by Reichenbach on pp. 351–352 as E. venosum
- Prosthechea rhynchophora (A.Rich & Galeotti) W.E.Higgins (1998), listed by Reichenbach on p. 352 as E. rhynchophorum
- Prosthechea sceptra (Lindl.) W.E.Higgins (1998), listed by Reichenbach on p. 353 as E. sceptrum
- Prosthechea serrulata (Sw.) W.E.Higgins (1998), listed by Reichenbach on p. 347 as E. serrulatum
