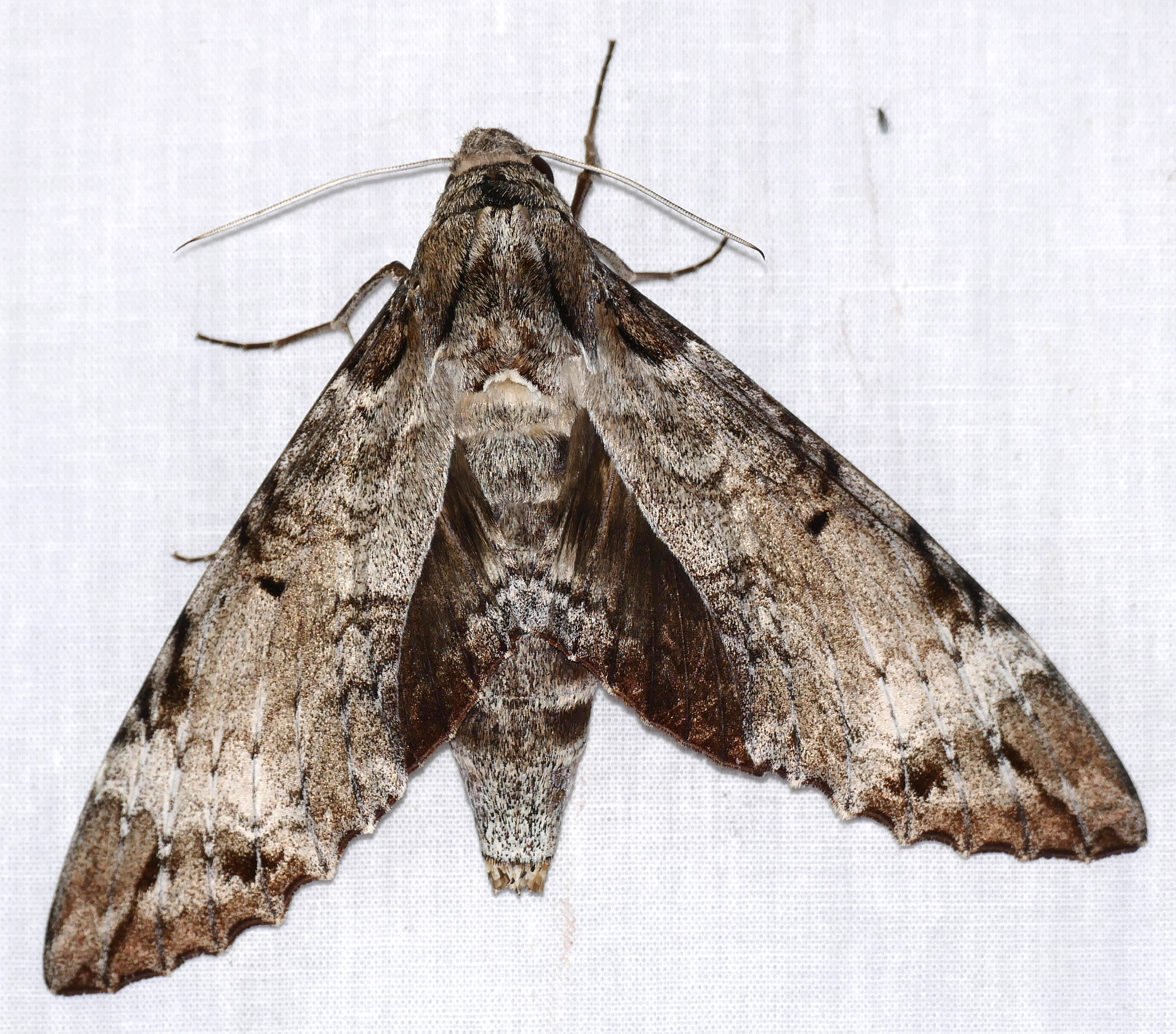
- Adult
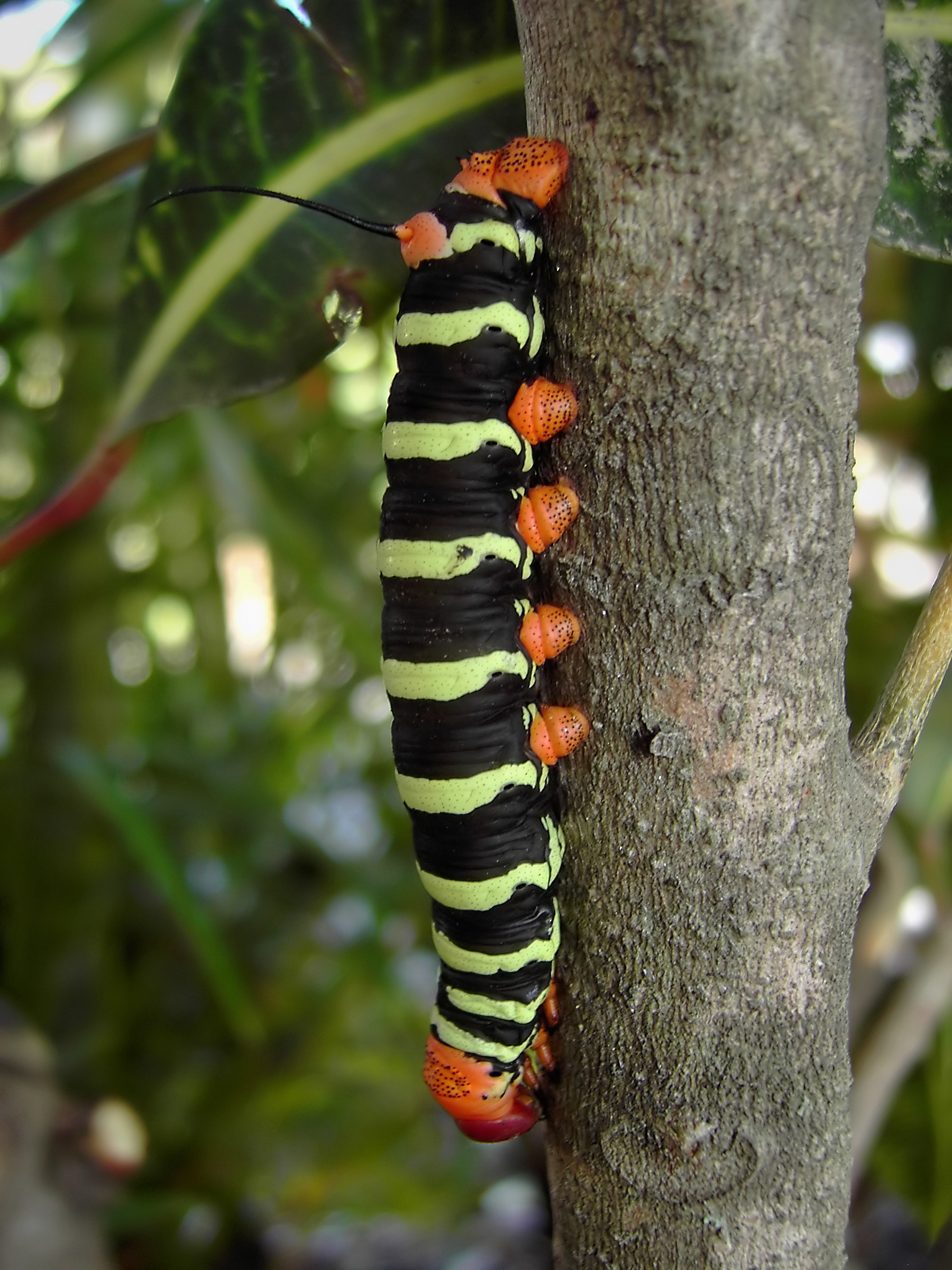
- Caterpillar

Conservation status
- Apparently Secure (NatureServe)

Scientific classification
- Kingdom: Animalia
- Phylum: Arthropoda
- Clade: Pancrustacea
- Class: Insecta
- Order: Lepidoptera
- Family: Sphingidae
- Subfamily: Macroglossinae
- Tribe: Dilophonotini
- Genus: Pseudosphinx; Burmeister, 1856
- Species: P. tetrio

Binomial name
- Pseudosphinx tetrio (Linnaeus, 1771)

Synonyms
- Generic; Macrosila H. Lucas, 1857; Specific; Pseudosphinx obscura Butler, 1876; Sphinx hasdrubal Cramer, 1779; Sphinx plumieriae Fabricius, 1793; Sphinx tetrio Linnaeus, 1771

= Pseudosphinx =

Genus of insects

Pseudosphinx is a monotypic genus of moth in the family Sphingidae first described by Hermann Burmeister in 1856. Its only species, Pseudosphinx tetrio, was first described by Carl Linnaeus in 1771. Its common names include tetrio sphinx, giant gray sphinx, frangipani hornworm, and plumeria caterpillar. In the island of Martinique it is best known as Rasta caterpillar (chenille rasta, in French) because of its colors which are reminiscent of the ones found in Rastafarian clothing and accessories. It is native to the tropical and subtropical Americas from the southern and southwestern United States to Brazil. The occasional individual has been recorded as far north as the northeastern United States.

== Description ==
The adult moth is brown with gray and white markings, and the hindwing is a darker brown. The female may be lighter in tone. The body has gray, white, and black bands. The wingspan is 12.7 to 14 centimeters, and the female is generally slightly larger than the male.

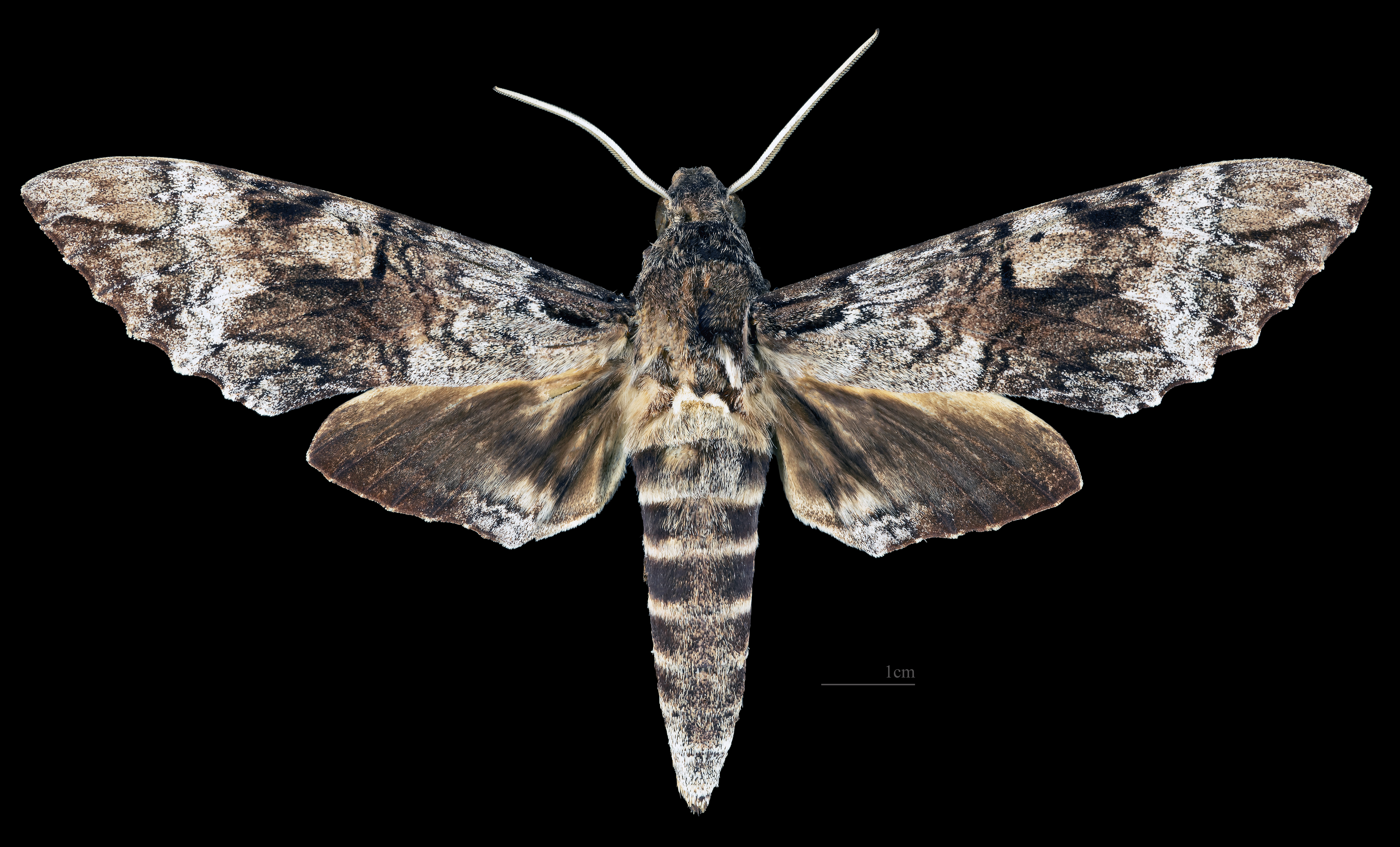
Male dorsal

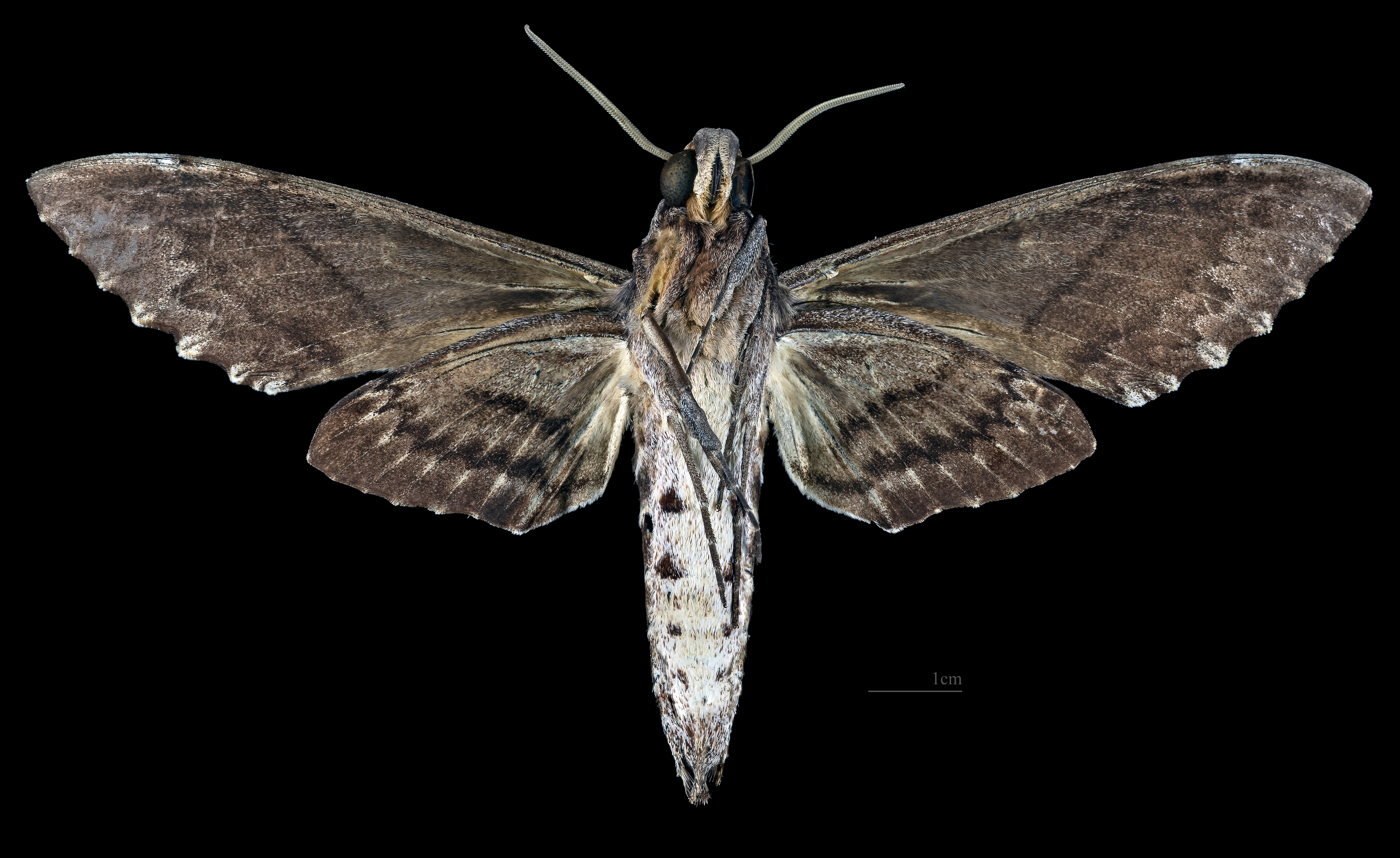
Male ventral

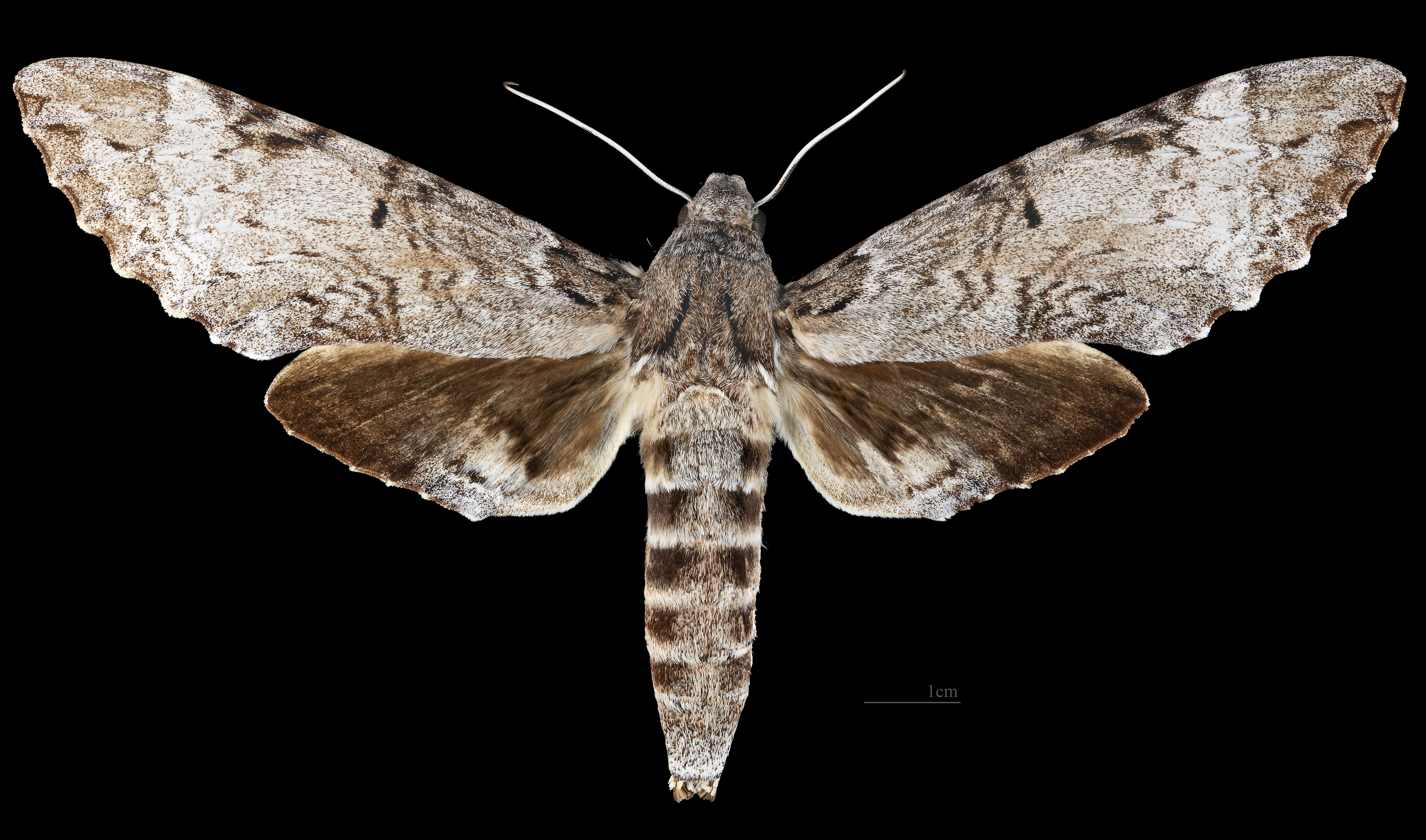
Female dorsal

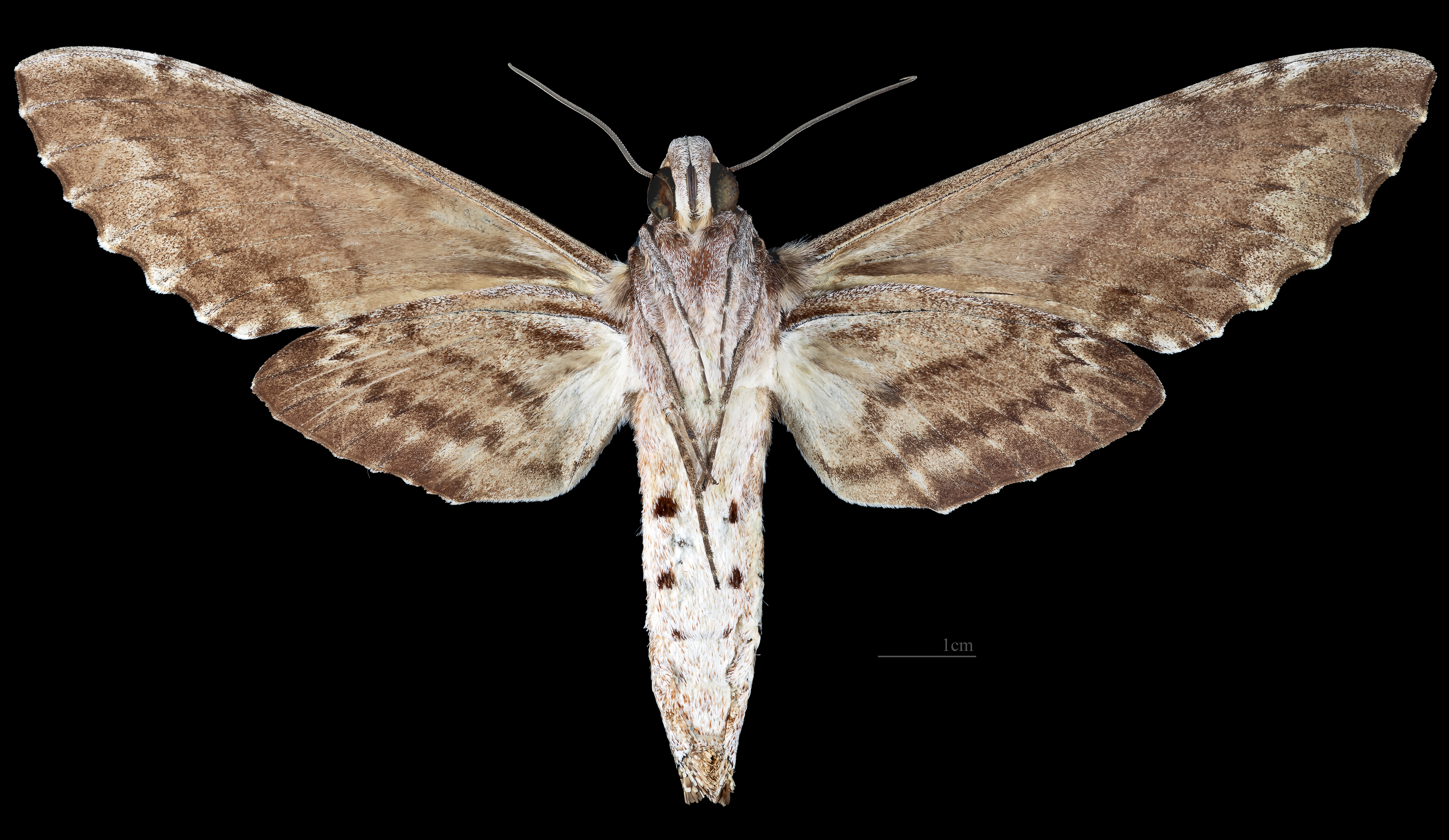
Female ventral

The larva is a caterpillar which may exceed 15 centimeters in length. It is black with aposematic yellow bands and a red-orange head. Toward the posterior end is an orange bump with a black horn roughly 2 centimeters long. The legs are orange with black spots. The pupa is about 7 centimeters long. It is yellow when new, turning brown and darkening to a reddish brown as it hardens.

== Biology ==
The moth specializes on plants of the dogbane family, Apocynaceae. Host taxa include Plumeria species such as red frangipani (P. rubra) and white frangipani (P. alba), and golden trumpet (Allamanda cathartica). P. alba in particular is so often infested with this caterpillar that it has been nicknamed "the wormy tree".

The female lays eggs in clusters of about 50 to 100. The caterpillars feed on the plant, detoxifying the poisonous latex present in most Apocynaceae. It pupates in the leaf litter or under the soil. The adult feeds on nectar. It has been recorded on Madagascar periwinkle (Catharanthus roseus) and pequi (Caryocar brasiliense). It has been observed as a pollinator of the fringed star orchid (Epidendrum ciliare) in Puerto Rico.

The caterpillar has several antipredator adaptations. Its consumption of toxic plants makes it distasteful to most predators. An exception is the smooth-billed ani (Crotophaga ani), which tears the caterpillar apart to eat it, avoiding the gut containing the plant material. The caterpillar is also coated in barbed urticating hairs, which stick deeply in skin and cause irritation. If caught, the caterpillar bites.

== Impacts ==
The species has been known to damage and defoliate Plumeria. Each caterpillar can consume three large leaves per day, and it will continue eating into the branches if it finishes the available foliage. Even in the case of defoliation, the species does not generally kill plants. The caterpillars are large and conspicuous and can be controlled by plucking them from the tree.

== Gallery ==
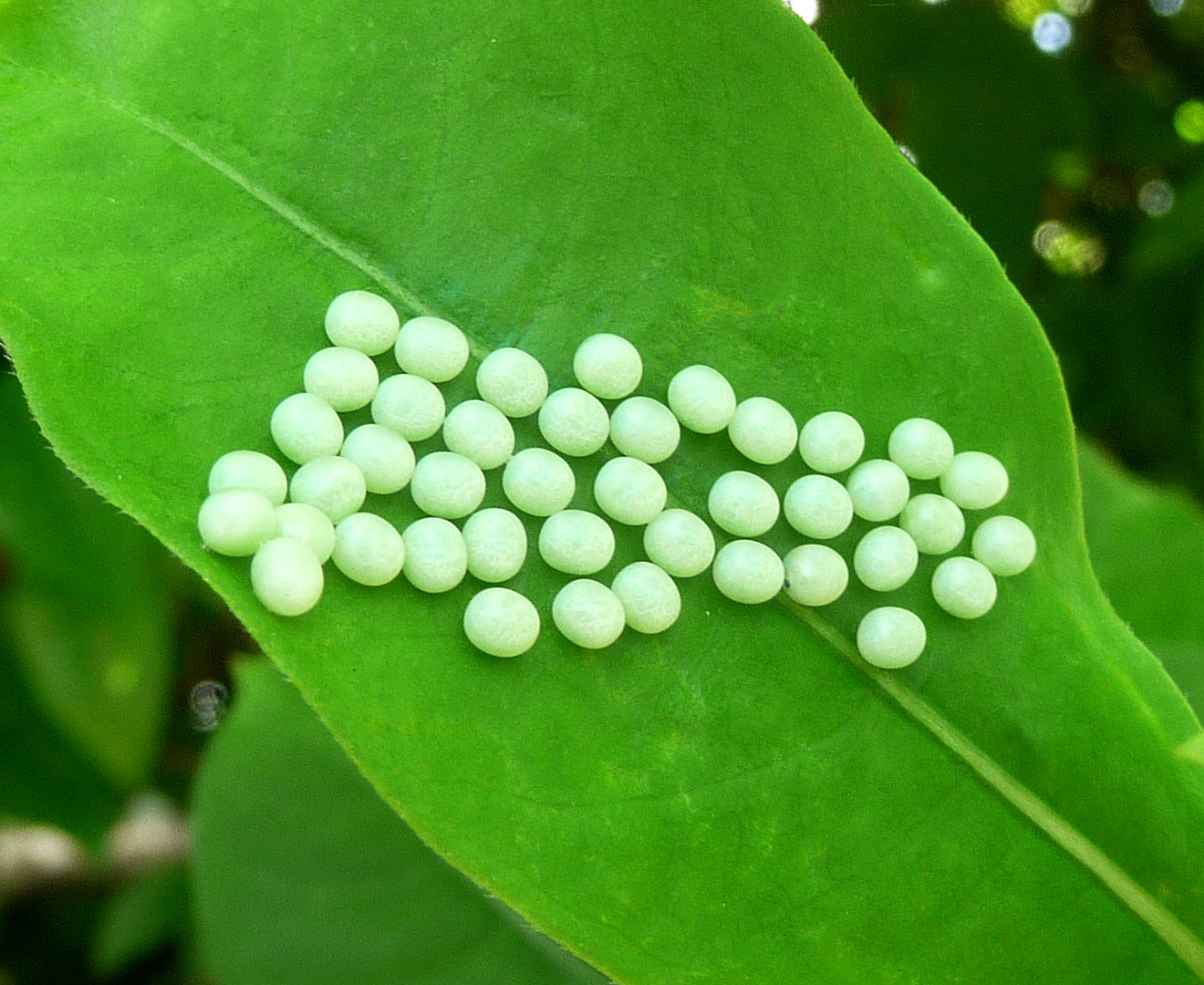
Eggs

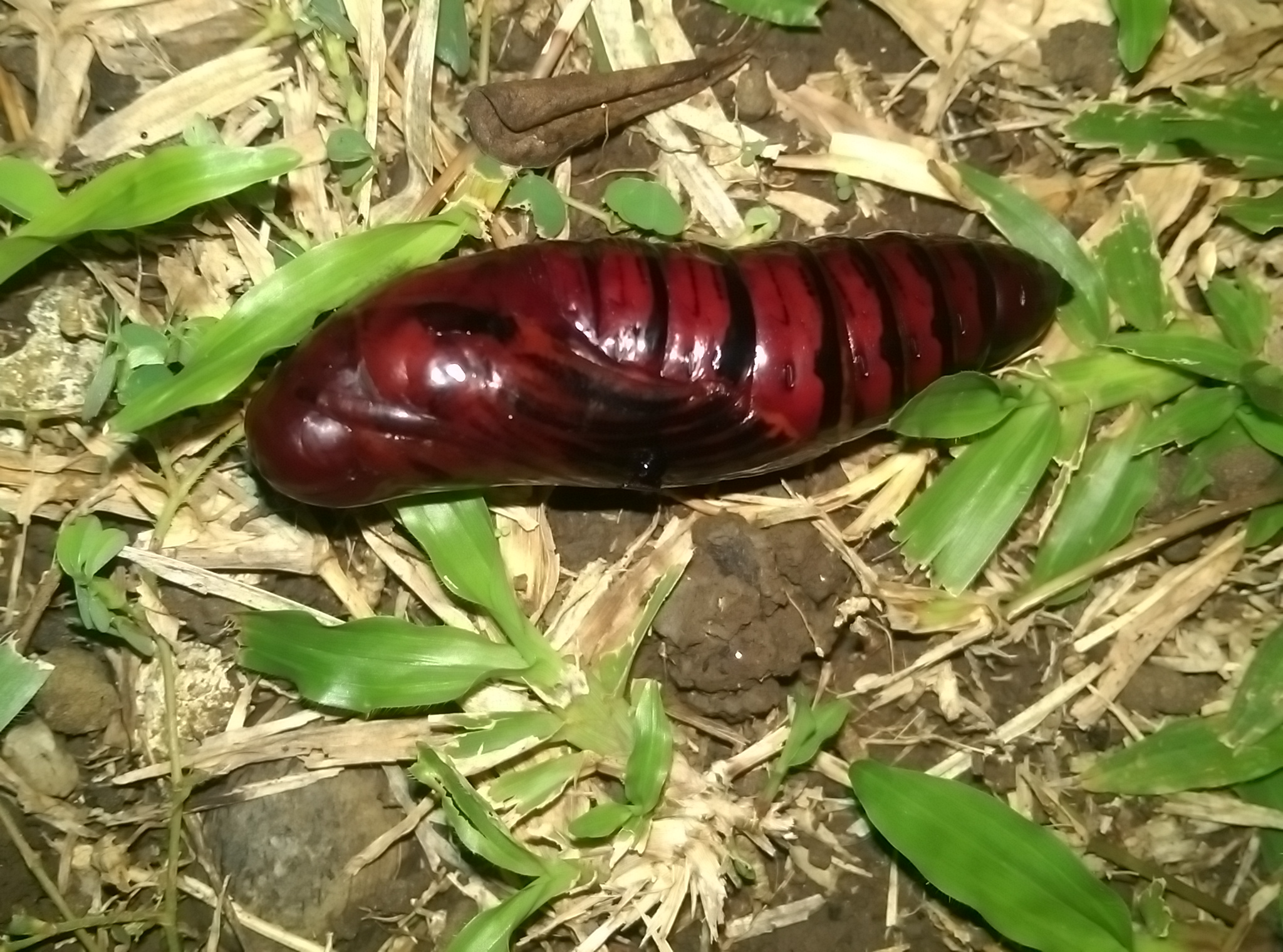
Chrysalis

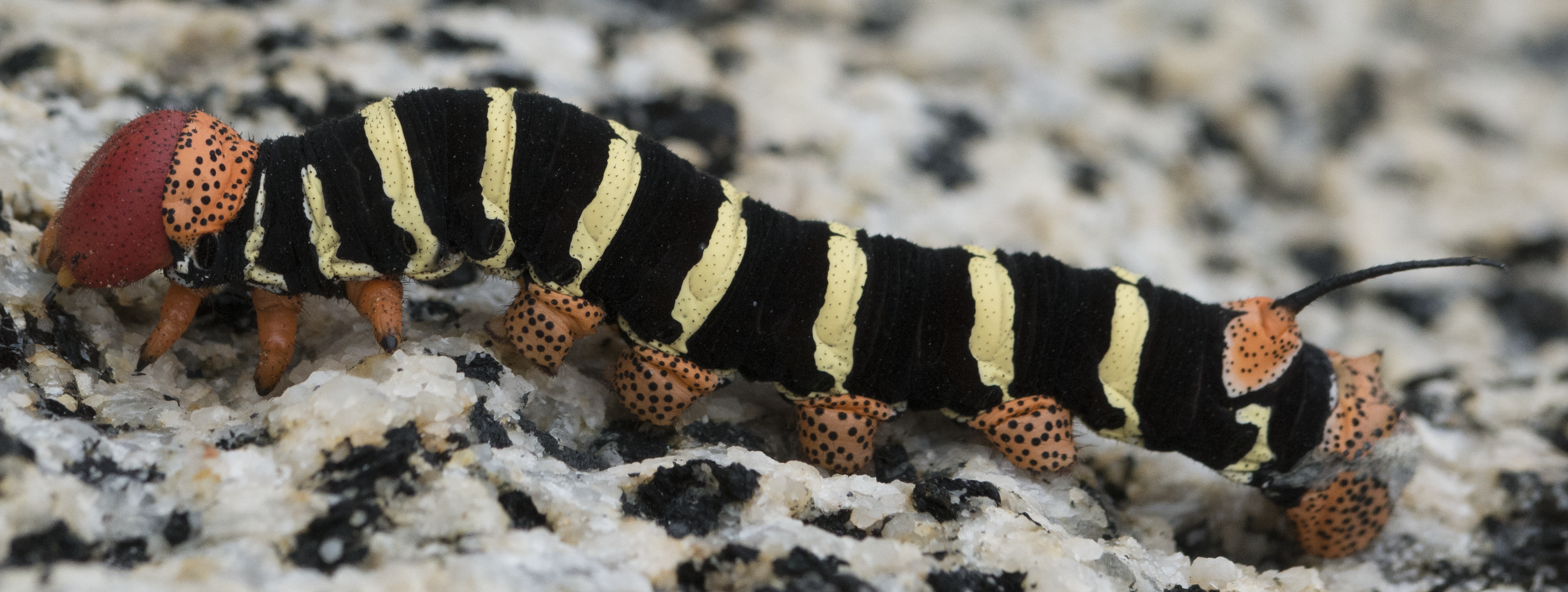
Caterpillar
