= Epidendrum parvilabre =

Scientific classification
- Kingdom: Plantae
- Clade: Tracheophytes
- Clade: Angiosperms
- Clade: Monocots
- Order: Asparagales
- Family: Orchidaceae
- Subfamily: Epidendroideae
- Genus: Epidendrum
- Subgenus: Epidendrum subg. Aulizeum
- Species: E. parvilabre

Binomial name
- Epidendrum parvilabre Lindl.

Species of orchid

Epidendrum parvilabre is a sympodial terrestrial orchid native to the mountainous (~2 km) tropical rainforests of Ecuador and Piura, Peru.

== Description ==
The sympodial stems of E. parvilabre are so thick that Reichenbach described them as pseudobulbs, although Dodson & Bennett 1969 did not follow suit, noting only that the stems are unifoliate. The oblong suboblique emarginate leathery leaves are longer than the stems. The densely flowered racemose inflorescence erupts from a double or triple spathe at the apex of the pseudobulb, similar to the subgenus E. subg. Spathium. The flower bracts are small and acute. The flowers are a little more than 1 cm across, with green sepals and petals, and a white lip with purple spots. The sepals are oblong-obtuse, 1 cm long, and 3–4 mm wide; the falcate revolute lateral sepals are slightly shorter and wider than the plicate dorsal sepal. The linear petals are much narrower than the sepals. The deeply trilobate lip is adnate to the column to its apex. The lateral lobes of the lip are falcate and very acute. The very narrow medial lobe of the lip is cuneate and trilobed at its apex.
