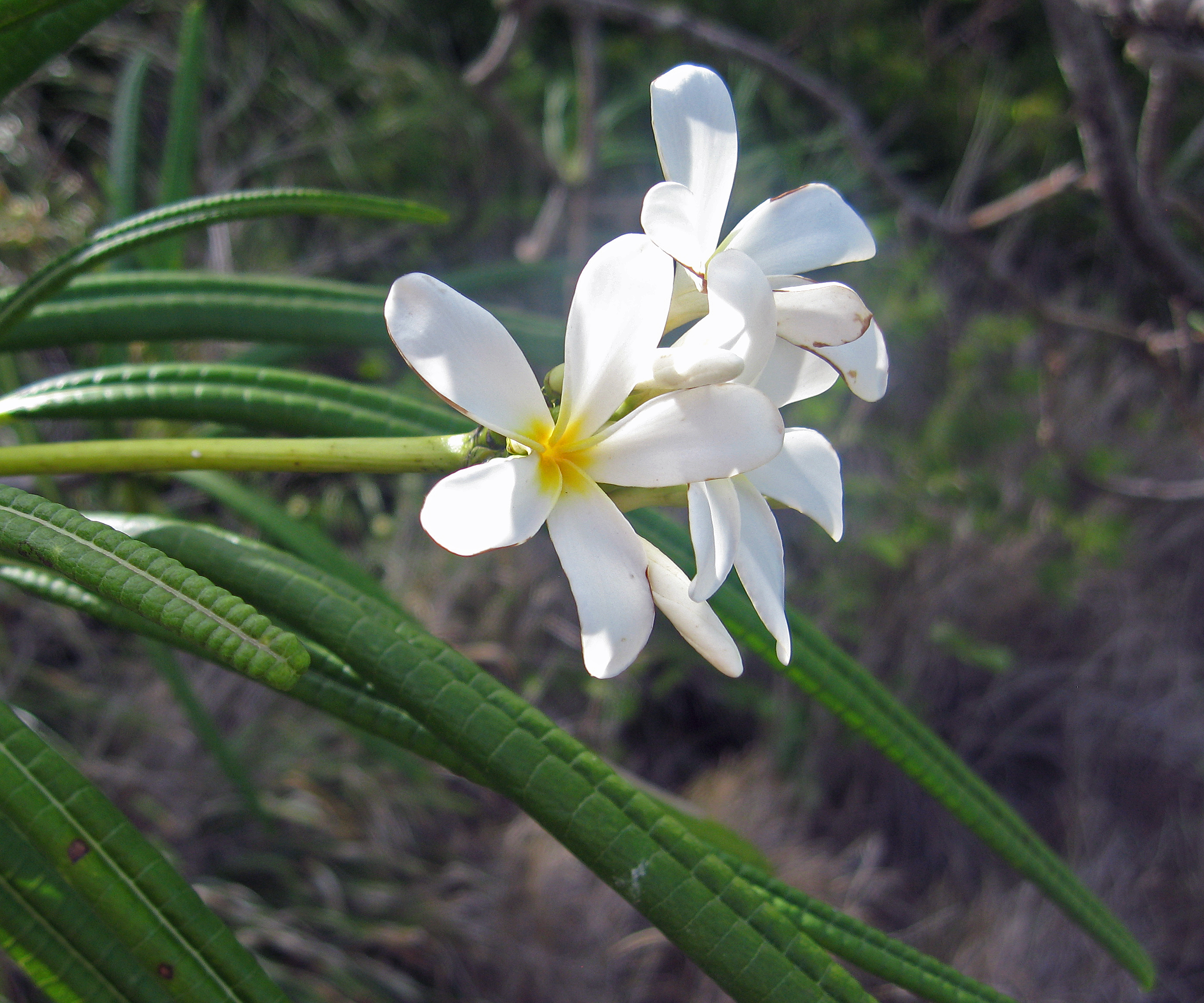

Conservation status
- Least Concern (IUCN 3.1)

Scientific classification
- Kingdom: Plantae
- Clade: Embryophytes
- Clade: Tracheophytes
- Clade: Angiosperms
- Clade: Eudicots
- Clade: Asterids
- Order: Gentianales
- Family: Apocynaceae
- Genus: Plumeria
- Species: P. alba

Binomial name
- Plumeria alba L.

Synonyms
- Plumeria revolutifolia Stokes

= Plumeria alba =

Species of tree

Plumeria alba is a species of flowering plant in the genus Plumeria native to Puerto Rico and the Lesser Antilles in the Caribbean. It is commonly known as West Indian jasmine, white frangipani plant, nosegay tree. It is a small deciduous tree and has been planted in tropical regions worldwide.

== Common names ==
- Caterpillar tree
- Cagoda tree
- Pigeon wood
- Nosegay tree
- White frangipani
- Kath golap (Bengali: কাঠ গোলাপ)
- Champa (Bengali: চাঁপা)
- Frangipanier à fleurs blanches (French)
- Lee La Wa Dee (Thai: ลีลาวดี)
- Châmpéi sâ (Khmer)
- Hoa chăm pa (Vietnamese)
- Kamboja (Indonesian)
- Kalatsútsing putî (Tagalog)
- Dok Champa (Lao: ດອກຈໍາປາ)
- Chafa (Marathi)
- Sudu araliya (Sinhala)
- Champo (Gujarati)
- الياسمين الهندي

== Description ==
Plumeria alba is a small, rounded deciduous tree, growing up to 25 feet (7.6 metres) tall. Flowers are fragrant, with five petals that are white in color and with a yellow center. The flowers bloom in clusters at the ends of branches. Leaves are simple, green and oblong to lanceolate in shape, with entire margins and alternate in arrangement. Leaves are up to 12 inches (30 centimetres) long and grow in a spiral arrangement near the tips of stems. Branches are gray to green in color, upright and grow closely at the trunk to form a vase shape with age. They release a milk sap when bruised or punctured.

== Etymology ==
The genus name is a reference to Charles Plumier, a French monk who was a botanist and traveller. The Latin specific epithet "alba" means white.

== Uses ==
P. alba is often cultivated as an ornamental plant. In Cambodia pagodas especially choose this shrub, with the flowers used in ritual offerings to the deities, they are sometimes used to make necklaces which decorate coffins. In addition, the flowers are edible and eaten as fritters, while the heart of the wood is part of a traditional medical preparation taken as a vermifuge or as a laxative.

== Gallery ==
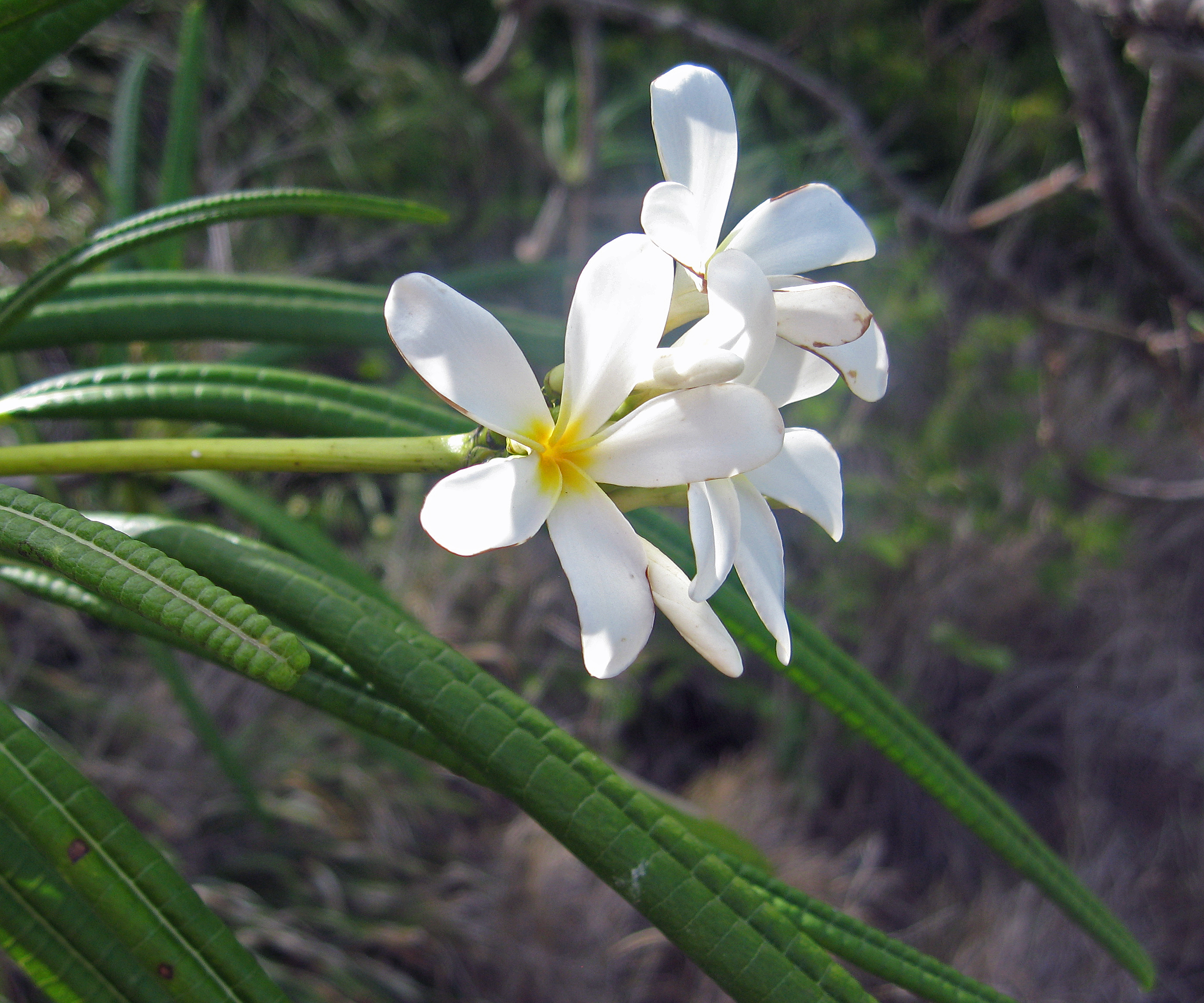
Flowers

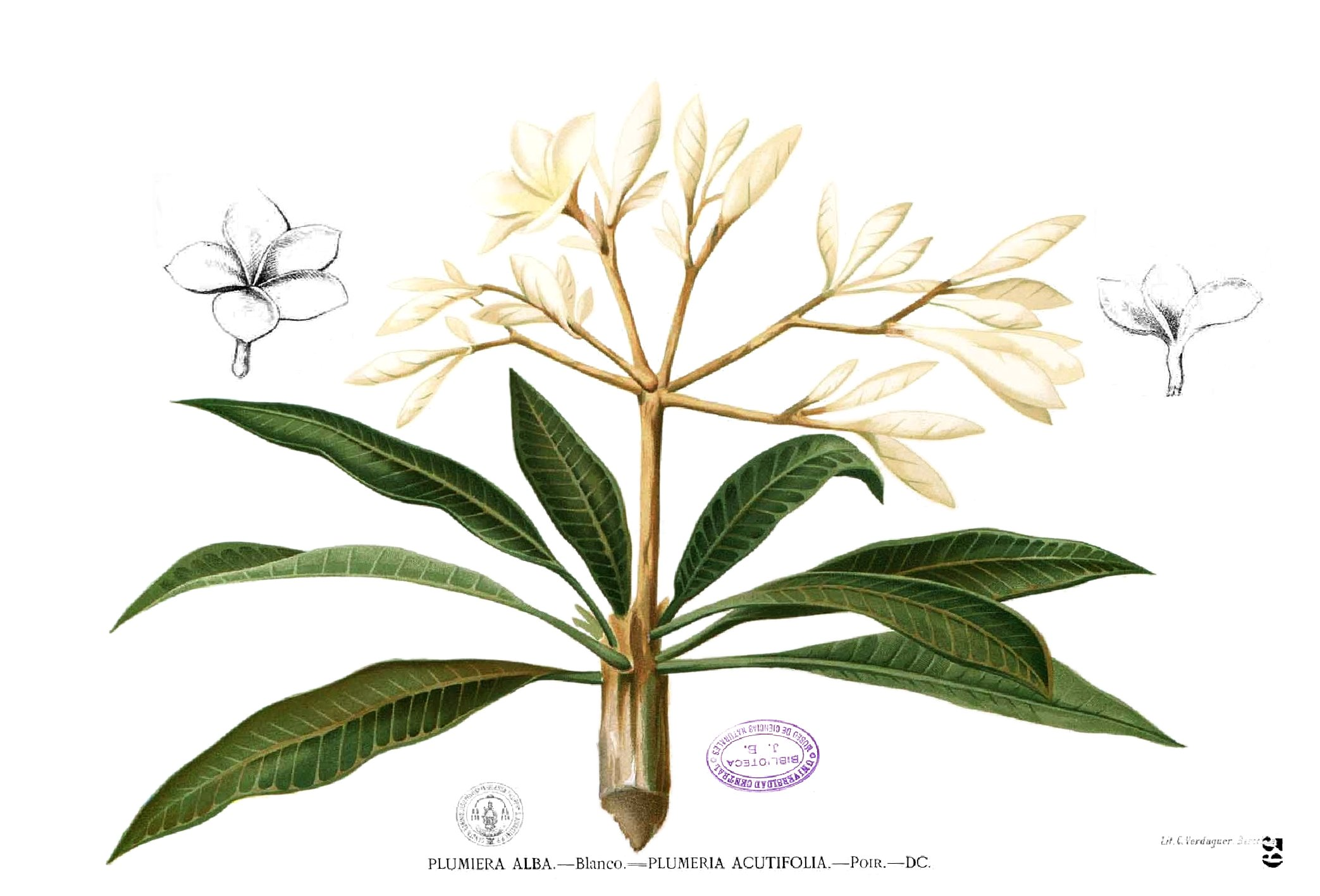
Illustration

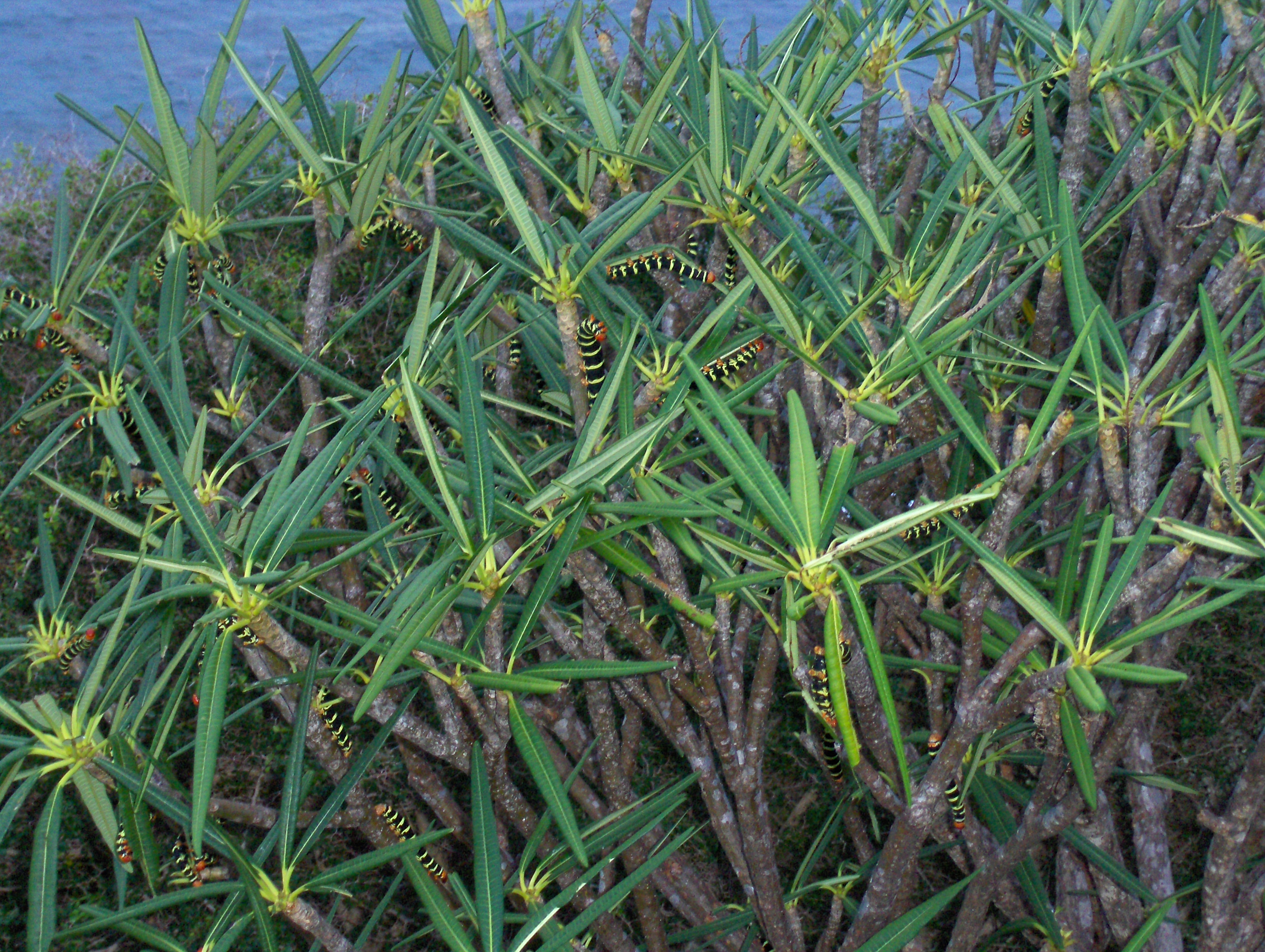
Foliage with Pseudosphinx caterpillars

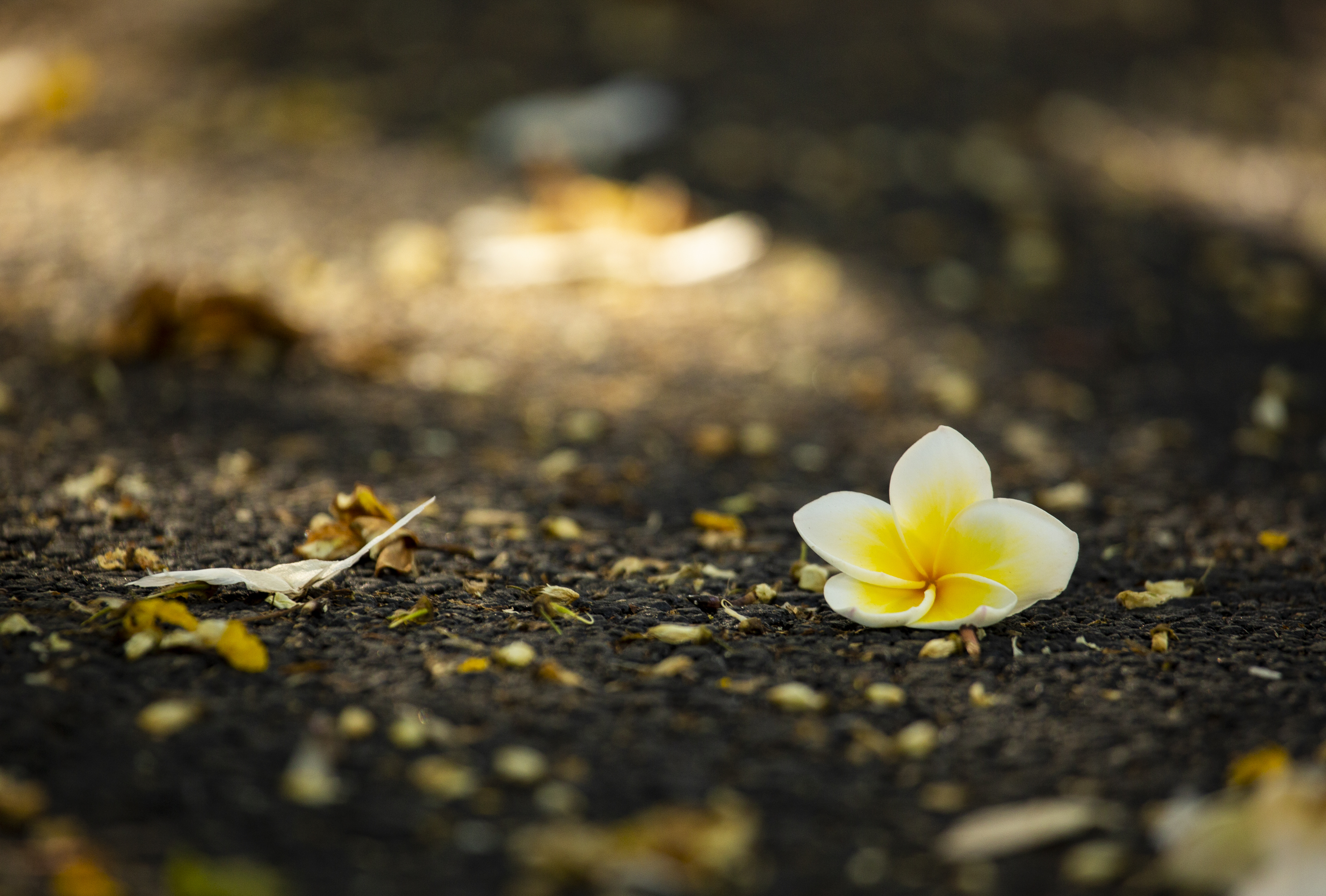
Plumeria alba flower, Bangalore, India
