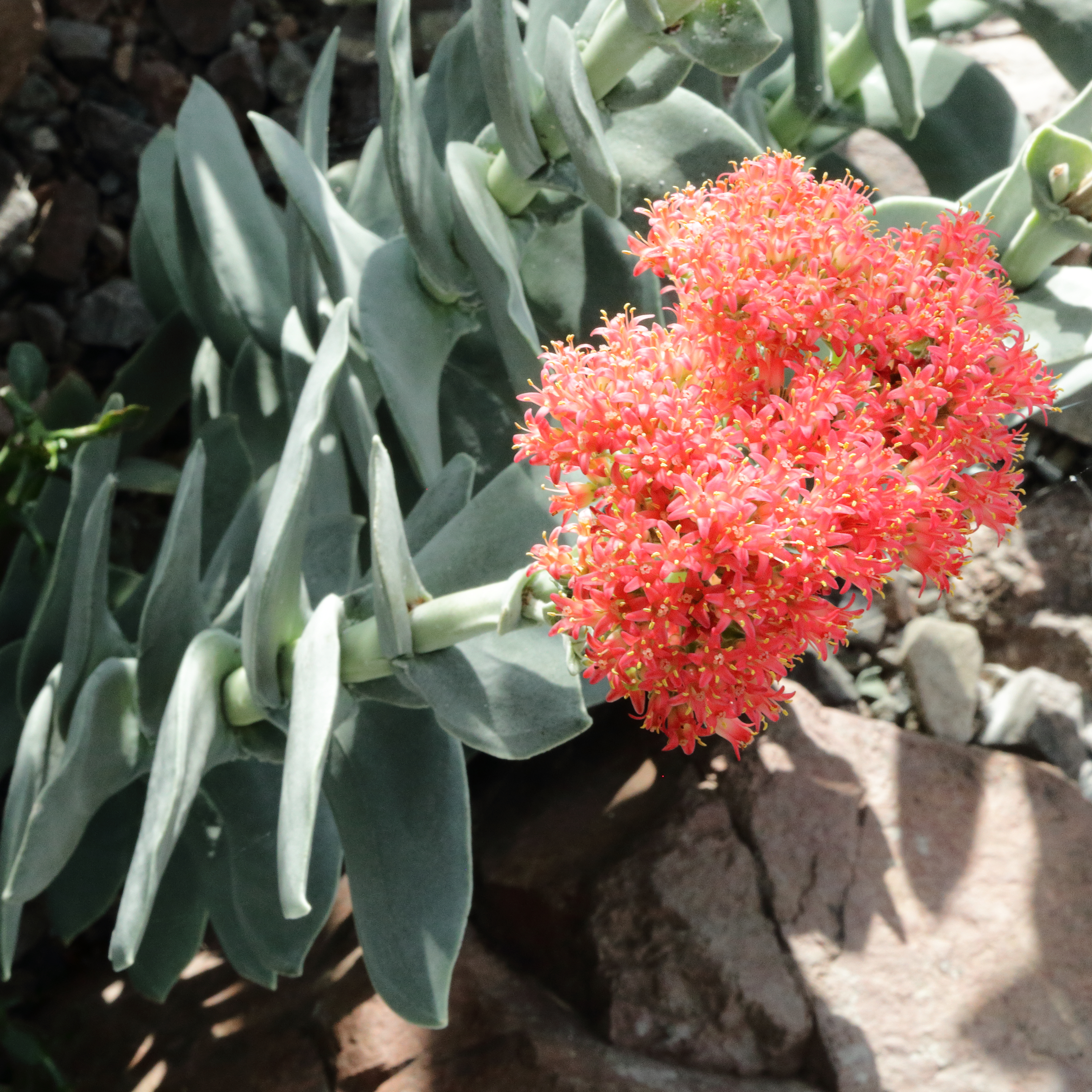
- C. perfoliata var. falcata

Scientific classification
- Kingdom: Plantae
- Clade: Embryophytes
- Clade: Tracheophytes
- Clade: Angiosperms
- Clade: Eudicots
- Order: Saxifragales
- Family: Crassulaceae
- Genus: Crassula
- Species: C. perfoliata

Binomial name
- Crassula perfoliata L.

Synonyms
- List: Rochea perfoliata var. alba (Haw.) Sweet; Rochea perfoliata (Linné) DC.; Rochea falcata var. acuminata Eckl. & Zeyh.; Larochea perfoliata var. alba Haw.; Larochea perfoliata (Linné) Haw.; Crassula perfoliata var. albiflora Harv.; Crassula pallida Bak.

= Crassula perfoliata =

Species of flowering plant

Crassula perfoliata is the type species of the genus Crassula, in the succulent/flowering plant family Crassulaceae, where it is placed in the subfamily Crassuloideae. Formally described by Linnaeus in 1753 as one of 10 species of Crassula, the plant is endemic to Southern Africa, where it may be found in Eswatini, Mozambique, South Africa and Zimbabwe.

Crassula perfoliata var. falcata, known as the airplane plant or airplane propellers, is arguably the best-known in cultivation; this popular variety has gained the Royal Horticultural Society (RHS) Award of Garden Merit.

== Description ==
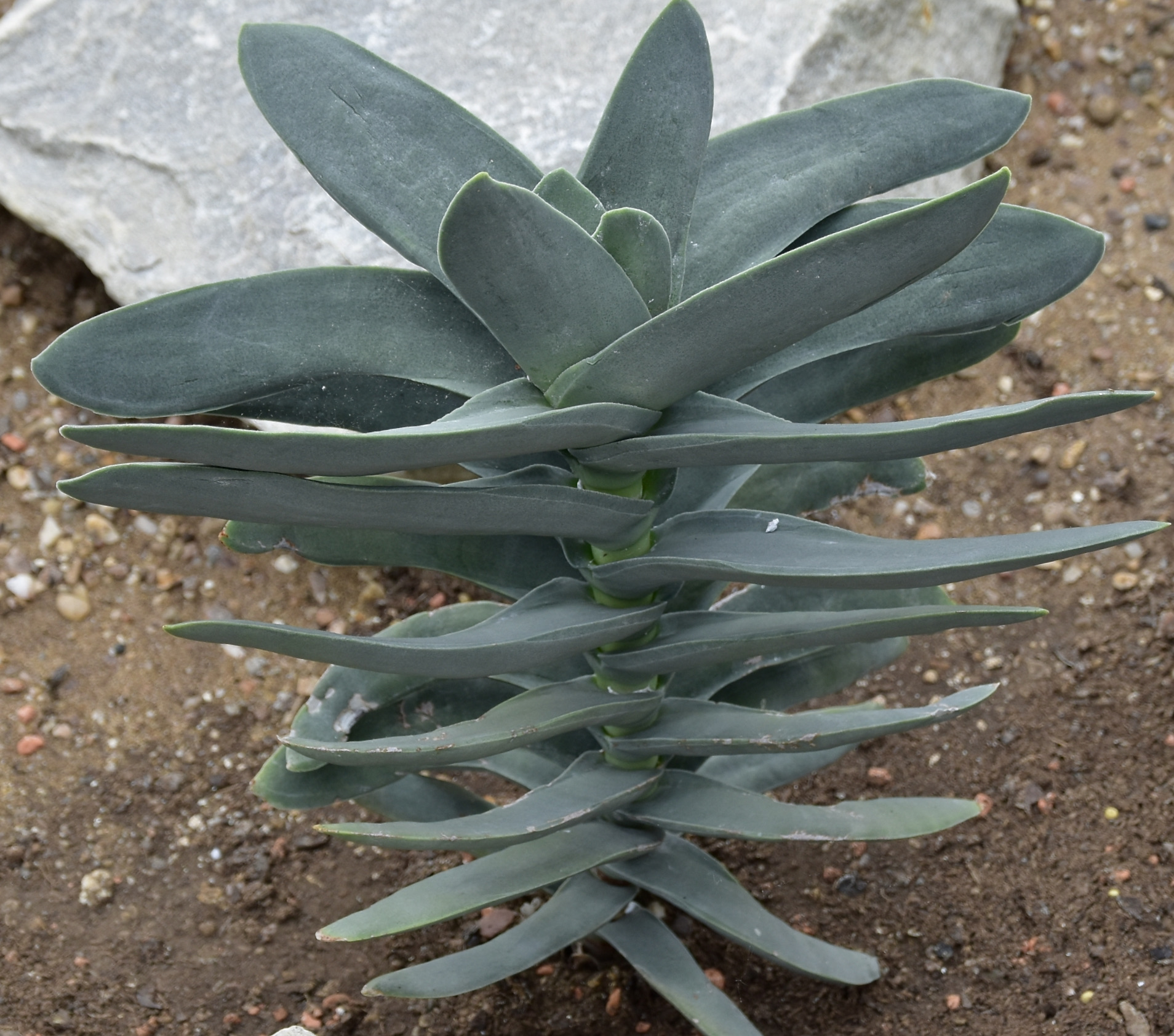
Leaf arrangement

Growing to 1 m (3.3 ft) tall by about as broad, this succulent, evergreen subshrub is known for its greyish-teal, sickle-shaped, thick foliage up to 90 x 28 mm, arranged in opposite rows, often with red markings, which emerges in a criss-cross or rosette formation, on an ever-lengthening, compact stem which may produce aerial roots and thus further spread the plant. The surface of the leaves is covered with dwarf, rounded papillae and the leaf margins are covered with very small teeth.

The Latin specific epithet perfoliata means "with the leaves surrounding the stem".

=== Inflorescences ===
It has inflorescences of brilliant profusions of scarlet blossoms in the summer, unlike many other Crassula species which are winter-blooming. The flowers are densely arranged in a rounded inflorescence on a long peduncle up to 100 mm (3.9 in) high. The bright red or pink color of the tubular flowers can also turn to almost white, they can be up to 7 mm long. The seeds are rather small.

== Distribution ==
It grows mainly on drier, partially exposed, lower slopes and canyon walls (for sufficient root drainage and aeration) from the Groot Winterhoek range of Western Cape to Port Elizabeth (Gqeberha) and Umtata (Mthatha) in the Eastern Cape. It is found on rocky outcrops, in meadows and on inaccessible cliffs, and in river valleys where it is well protected. It is confined to outcrops of quartzite sandstone (rarely shale), from the Groot Winterhoek and Cape Fold Belt, south of Umtata to the northeast in South Africa.

== Cultivation ==
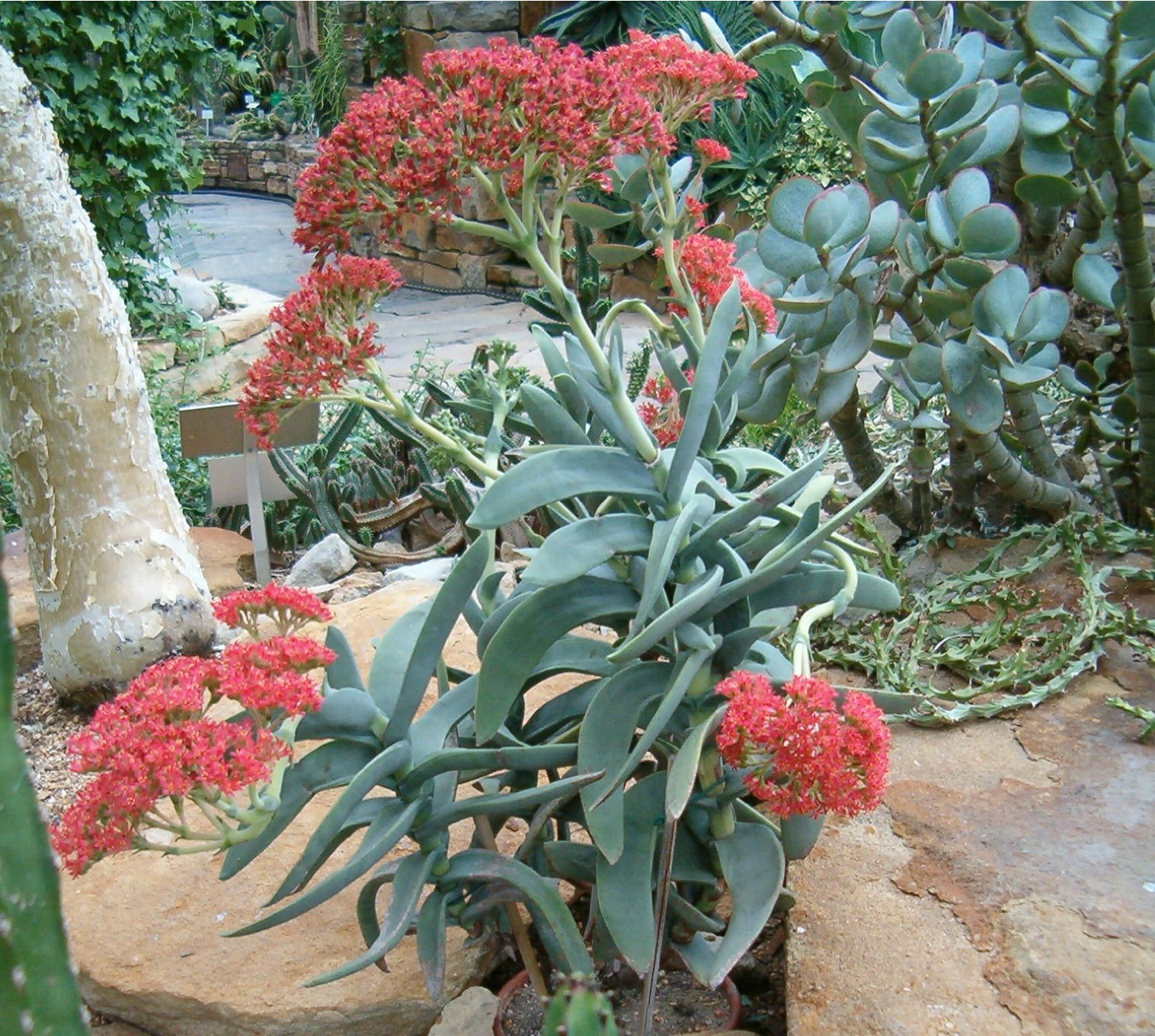
In a container

It does not tolerate freezing temperatures, thus in temperate zones, it must be grown under glass in a greenhouse during the coldest seasons, or brought indoors and kept in a very sunny southern or western window, lest they become distended and begin reaching for the sunlight, as is typical of many succulents grown indoors.

When repotting Crassula, the plants should be, preferably, potted in as loose and aerated of a substrate as can be provided. Coconut husk or fiber, potting soil, commercial orchid or cacti mixes, or organic compost are all acceptable as a base substrate, adding a small amount of earthworm castings (vermicompost) as a nutrition source; Crassula, like many succulents, are not heavy feeders and do not require intense or regular fertilisation—though it will not harm them, provided it is infrequent (monthly basis during growing season) and well-diluted. Granulated or pelleted timed-release fertilisers are additionally beneficial, only being released when the soil is wet, and thus may last for between three and six months.

However, regardless of soil composition, water must flow freely from the substrate so as not to risk root rot. Substrates for succulent species, such as Crassula, should be amended with inert (inorganic) materials to add aeration, such as perlite, pumice, gravel, decomposed granite, or sand, or a mixture. It is also susceptible to damage from excessive sun exposure, which may show as scarring, burning or chlorotic or yellowing foliage.

== Varieties ==
Four varieties are recognized:

- Crassula perfoliata var. coccinea (Sweet) G.D.Rowley
- C. perfoliata var. falcata (J.C.Wendl.) Toelken
- C. perfoliata var. heterotricha (Schinz) Toelken
- C. perfoliata var. perfoliata

== Bibliography ==
- Linnaeus, Carl (1753). "Crassula". Species Plantarum: exhibentes plantas rite cognitas, ad genera relatas, cum differentiis specificis, nominibus trivialibus, synonymis selectis, locis natalibus, secundum systema sexuale digestas. Stockholm: Impensis Laurentii Salvii. pp. 282–283., see also Species Plantarum
- WFO (2019). "Crassula perfoliata L." World Flora Online.
