= Epidendrum polystachyum =

Scientific classification
- Kingdom: Plantae
- Clade: Tracheophytes
- Clade: Angiosperms
- Clade: Monocots
- Order: Asparagales
- Family: Orchidaceae
- Subfamily: Epidendroideae
- Genus: Epidendrum
- Subgenus: Epidendrum subg. Aulizeum
- Species: E. polystachyum

Binomial name
- Epidendrum polystachyum Kunth in F.W.H.von Humboldt, A.J.A.Bonpland & C.S.Kunth, 1816

Species of orchid

Epidendrum polystachyum HBK (1816) is an epiphytic orchid, which grows wild in seasonally dry forests on the western slopes of the Andes in Ecuador and Peru (including Piura) at altitudes near 2 km.

== Description ==
Epidendrum polystachyum has a sympodial habit, producing fusiform pseudobulbs, each with several oblong obtuse conduplicate leaves. The terminal inflorescence is a many-branched panicle with few flowers on each branch (Reichenbach 1861 says "scapo polystachyo"). The sepals, petals, and lip are peach colored: the dorsal sepal oblong to lanceolate, acuminate and reflexed; the lateral sepals oblique and reflexed; the petals lanceolate-spatulate. The trilobate lip is adnate to the column to its apex: the lateral lobes irregularly obovate with erose to crenulate margins; the medial lobe smaller, deeply emarginate, divided in two at the apex, with a raised oblong yellow-green callus.

== Homonym ==
Epidendrum polystachyum Pav. ex Lindl. (1831) is a synonym for Epidendrum polyanthum Lindl. (1831).
