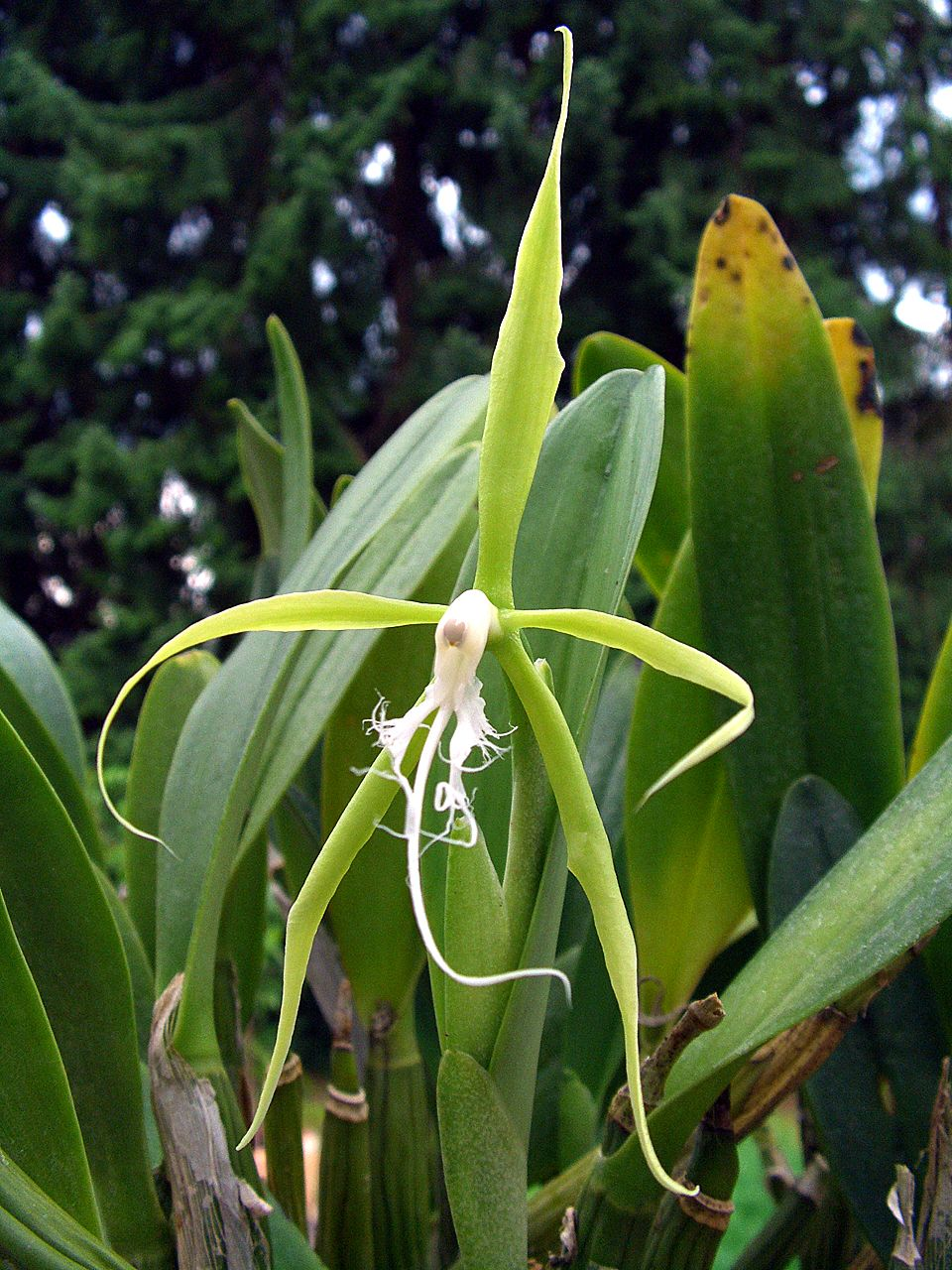

Scientific classification
- Kingdom: Plantae
- Clade: Tracheophytes
- Clade: Angiosperms
- Clade: Monocots
- Order: Asparagales
- Family: Orchidaceae
- Subfamily: Epidendroideae
- Tribe: Epidendreae
- Subtribe: Laeliinae
- Genus: Epidendrum
- Species: E. ciliare

Binomial name
- Epidendrum ciliare L.

Synonyms
- Auliza ciliaris (L.) Salisb.; Coilostylis ciliaris (L.) Withner & P.A.Harding; Coilostylis cuspidata (G.Lodd.) Withner & P.A.Harding; Coilostylis emarginata Raf.; Encyclia ciliaris (L.) A.Lemée, no basionym ref.; Epidendrum ciliare var. cuspidatum (G.Lodd.) Lindl.; Epidendrum ciliare var. minor Stein; Epidendrum ciliare var. typicum Stehlé, not validly publ.; Epidendrum ciliare var. viscidum (Lindl.) Lindl.; Epidendrum cuspidatum G.Lodd.; Epidendrum cuspidatum var. brachysepalum Rchb.f.; Epidendrum sanctalucianum H.G.Jones; Epidendrum viscidum Lindl.

= Epidendrum ciliare =

Fringed star orchid

Species of orchid

Epidendrum ciliare, synonyms including Coilostylis ciliaris is a species of orchid. It is known as the fringed star orchid. It has a wide distribution from Mexico through Central America and the Caribbean to northern and western South America.

It was first described by Carl Linnaeus in 1759. It was transferred from Epidendrum to Coilostylis by Withner and Harding in 2004, but this is not accepted by Plants of the World Online.

The diploid chromosome number of E. ciliare has been determined from several individuals as 2n = 40, 80, and 160, the haploid chromosome number as n = 20.

The moth Pseudosphinx tetrio has been observed as a pollinator in Puerto Rico.
