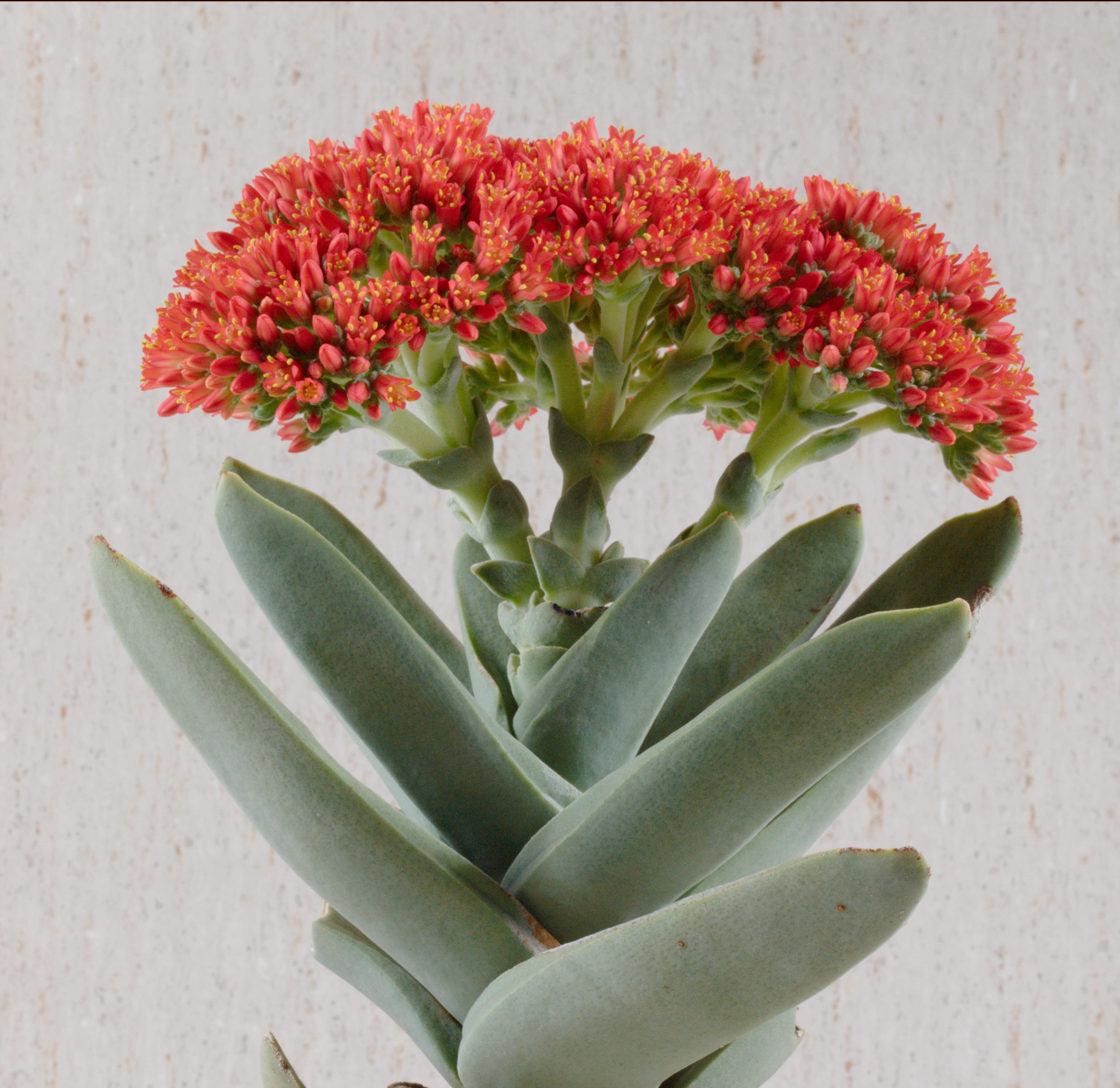

Scientific classification
- Kingdom: Plantae
- Clade: Embryophytes
- Clade: Tracheophytes
- Clade: Angiosperms
- Clade: Eudicots
- Order: Saxifragales
- Family: Crassulaceae
- Genus: Crassula
- Species: C. perfoliata
- Variety: C. p. var. falcata

Trinomial name
- Crassula perfoliata var. falcata (J.C.Wendl.) Toelken

Synonyms
- Crassula decussata DC. (1828); Crassula falcata J.C.Wendl. (1798); Crassula falcata Dum.Cours. (1802), nom. illeg.; Crassula falx Linding. (1936), no Latin descr.; Crassula perfoliata var. minor (Haw.) G.D.Rowley (1978); Crassula retroflexa Meerb. (1798), nom. illeg.; Crassula swellingrebliana DC. (1828); Larochea falcata (J.C.Wendl.) Pers. (1805); Larochea falcata var. minor Haw. (1821); Rochea falcata (J.C.Wendl.) DC. (1802)

= Crassula perfoliata var. falcata =

Airplane plant

Variety of flowering plant

Crassula perfoliata var. falcata (synonym Crassula falcata), known by the common names airplane plant and propeller plant, is a succulent plant endemic to South Africa, from the Cape of Good Hope.

== Description ==
The foliage is gray-green with striking texture, on plants that grow to 2 feet (0.61 m) tall.

The flowers are tiny and scarlet red, that rise in dense clusters above the foliage for a month in summer.

== Cultivation ==
Crassula falcata is cultivated for use in drought tolerant and succulent gardens, and in container gardens.
