= Cassia falcata =

Cassia falcata may refer to:

- Senna corymbosa, an ornamental plant in the genus Senna
- Senna occidentalis, the coffee senna, a pantropical plant species
