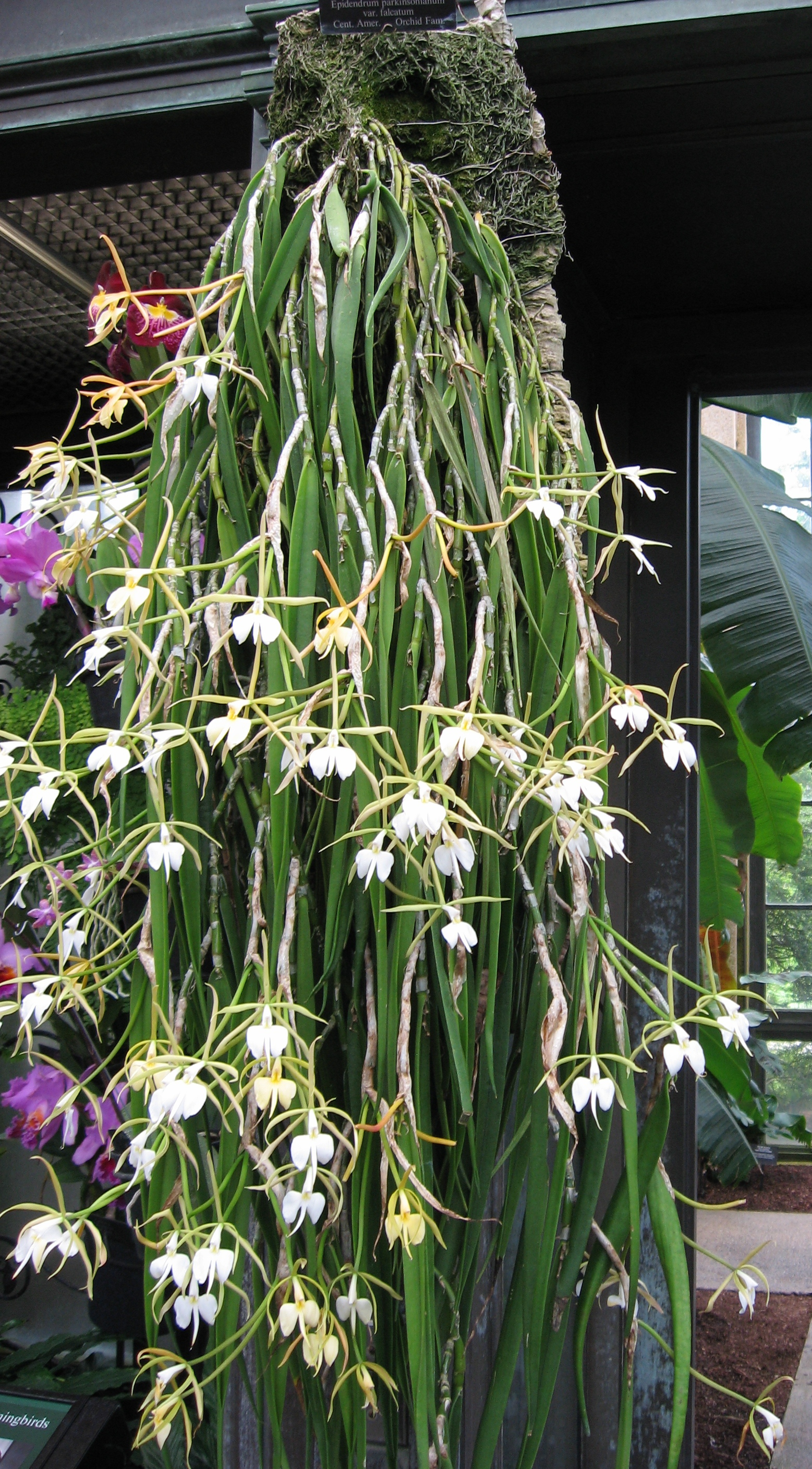

Scientific classification
- Kingdom: Plantae
- Clade: Embryophytes
- Clade: Tracheophytes
- Clade: Spermatophytes
- Clade: Angiosperms
- Clade: Monocots
- Order: Asparagales
- Family: Orchidaceae
- Subfamily: Epidendroideae
- Genus: Epidendrum
- Species: E. falcatum

Binomial name
- Epidendrum falcatum Lindl.

Synonyms
- Coilostylis falcata (Lindl.) Withner & P.A.Harding; Epidendrum lactiflorum A.Rich. & Galeotti; Epidendrum parkinsonianum var. falcatum (Lindl.)

= Epidendrum falcatum =

Species of orchid

Epidendrum falcatum, synonym Coilostylis falcata, is an orchid native to Mexico and Honduras.

The thick, lanceolate leaves are long and unusually pendent, growing up to 30 cm from a reduced pseudobulb. The large, snow-white flowers grow from a shorter flower spike in overhanging tufts of no more than three flowers. These flowers are fragrant at night. They bloom in late spring.

It was first described by John Lindley in 1840. It was transferred from Epidendrum to Coilostylis by Withner and Harding in 2004, but this is not accepted by Plants of the World Online.
