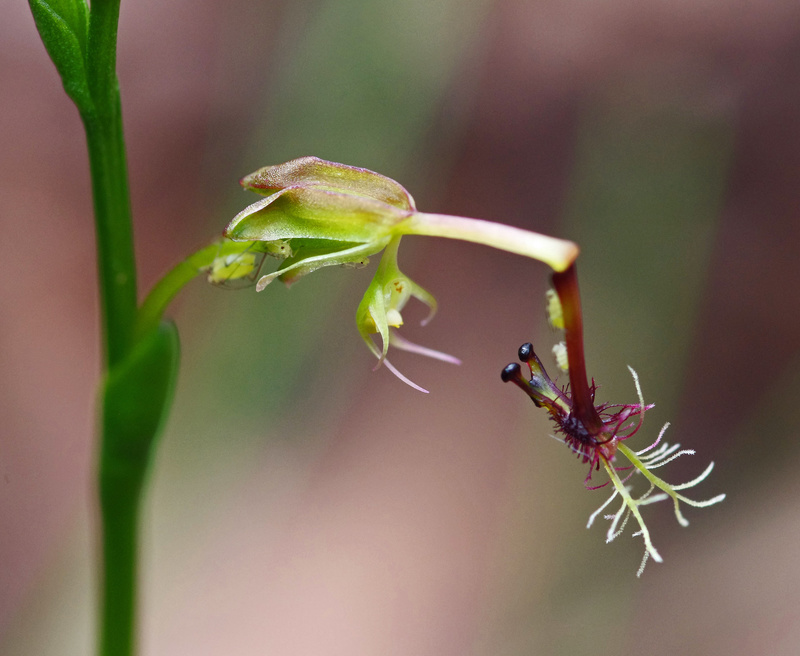
- Arthrochilus huntianus in Lerderderg State Park

Scientific classification
- Kingdom: Plantae
- Clade: Tracheophytes
- Clade: Angiosperms
- Clade: Monocots
- Order: Asparagales
- Family: Orchidaceae
- Subfamily: Orchidoideae
- Tribe: Diurideae
- Genus: Arthrochilus
- Species: A. huntianus

Binomial name
- Arthrochilus huntianus (F.Muell.) Blaxell

Synonyms
- Drakaea huntiana F.Muell.; Spiculaea huntiana (F.Muell.) Schltr.; Thynninorchis huntiana (F.Muell.) D.L.Jones & M.A.Clem.

= Arthrochilus huntianus =

Common elbow orchid

Species of flowering plant

Arthrochilus huntianus, commonly known as common elbow orchid, is a flowering plant in the orchid family (Orchidaceae) and is endemic to south-eastern Australia. It has no leaves but an insect-like flower which has its labellum dangling like a lure away from the rest of the flower. Because of its thin, wiry stem and small, dull-coloured flowers, this orchid is difficult to locate. Like others in the genus, the flowers are pollinated by a species of thynnid wasp. Some authorities use the name Thynninorchis huntiana for this orchid.

== Description ==
Arthrochilus huntianus is a leafless terrestrial, perennial, deciduous, sympodial herb with an underground tuber which produces daughter tubers on the end of root-like stolons. Up to ten insect-like flowers 9–11 mm (0.35–0.43 in) long and about 1.5 mm (0.06 in) wide are borne on a thin, wiry, green to reddish flowering stem 60–150 mm (2–6 in) tall. There are two, three or four bracts at the base of the flowering stem. The dorsal sepal and petals are 3–4 mm (0.1–0.2 in) long about 1 mm (0.04 in) wide and the lateral sepals are 5–6 mm (0.20–0.24 in) long and about 0.7 mm (0.03 in) wide. The sepals and petals all turn downwards towards the ovary. The labellum is 5–6 mm (0.20–0.24 in) long about 0.7 mm (0.03 in) wide on a thin stalk or "claw" 5–7 mm (0.2–0.3 in) long. The labellum callus is insect-like and consists of a shiny black "head" with two antenna-like structures, a "thorax" with long purplish or reddish hairs and a pair of long branched tails with tiny bristles. There are two pairs of curved wings on the column. Flowering occurs from November to March.

== Taxonomy and naming ==
The common elbow orchid was first formally described in 1889 by Ferdinand von Mueller and given the name Drakaea huntiana. The description was published in The Victorian Naturalist from a specimen collected "between loose stones on Mount Tingiringi". In 1972 Donald Blaxell changed the name to Arthrochilus huntianus and in 2002 David Jones and Mark Clements changed the name to Thynninorchis huntiana but the latter name has not been universally accepted. The specific epithet (huntianus) honours "Robt. Hunt, Esq. C.M.G., F.G.S., Master of the Sydney-Mint and Vice-President of the Committee of the Technological Museum" who discovered this species.

In 1998 David Jones described two subspecies of A. huntianus:

- Arthrochilus huntianus subsp. huntianus which occurs on continental Australia and formerly on Flinders Island;
- Arthrochilus huntianus subsp. nothofagicola which grows in dense rainforest with Nothofagus cunninghamii which has a smaller labellum callus and is probably self-pollinating.

In 2002 David Jones and Mark Clements raised the subspecies nothofagicola to species status as Thynninorchis nothofagicola but the name has not been accepted by some authorities. The two subspecies of Arthrochilus huntianus differ from other orchids in the genus by being leafless and having the labellum dangling with an insect-like "lure" on the end.

Arthrochilus huntianus subsp. nothofagicola, as Thynninorchis nothofagicola, is classified as "critically endangered" under the Australian Government Environment Protection and Biodiversity Conservation Act 1999 and as "endangered" under the Tasmanian Threatened Species Protection Act 1995. The species (or subspecies) is only known from a single site and is threatened by the activities of the introduced superb lyrebird (Menura novaehollandiae), by fire, forestry activities and climate change.

== Distribution and habitat ==
Arthrochilus huntianus grows in woodland and forest, usually in leaf litter. In New South Wales it mainly grows on the Great Dividing Range south from the Blue Mountains and is widespread in eastern Victoria. It formerly occurred on Flinders Island in Tasmania but is now regarded as extinct there.

== Ecology ==
As with other Arthrochilus orchids, A. huntianus is pollinated by males thynnid wasps of the genus Arthrothynnus although the species involved is not known. It also reproduces asexually by producing new tubers.
