= Arthrochilus prolixus =

Wispy elbow orchid

Scientific classification
- Kingdom: Plantae
- Clade: Tracheophytes
- Clade: Angiosperms
- Clade: Monocots
- Order: Asparagales
- Family: Orchidaceae
- Subfamily: Orchidoideae
- Tribe: Diurideae
- Genus: Arthrochilus
- Species: A. prolixus

Binomial name
- Arthrochilus prolixus D.L.Jones

Species of flowering plant

Arthrochilus prolixus, commonly known as wispy elbow orchid, is a flowering plant in the orchid family (Orchidaceae) and is endemic to eastern Australia. It has a rosette of bluish green leaves at its base and up to twenty two pale green, insect-like flowers with dark reddish to purplish glands on its labellum.

== Description ==
Arthrochilus prolixus is a terrestrial, perennial, deciduous, sympodial herb with an underground tuber which produces daughter tubers on the end of root-like stolons. It has a rosette of between two and six linear to lance-shaped leaves on a side branch at its base, each leaf 40–70 mm (2–3 in) long and 7–15 mm (0.3–0.6 in) wide. Between three and twenty two pale green, insect-like flowers 10–16 mm (0.4–0.6 in) long are borne on a flowering stem 80–200 mm (3–8 in) tall. The dorsal sepal is linear, 9–10 mm (0.35–0.39 in) long, about 2 mm (0.08 in) wide and partly wrapped around the base of the column. The lateral sepals are lance-shaped, 6–7 mm (0.2–0.3 in) long, about 2 mm (0.08 in) wide. The petals are linear, about 7 mm (0.3 in) long and 1 mm (0.04 in) wide. The lateral sepals and petals are turned back against the ovary. The labellum is about 6 mm (0.2 in) long, 1 mm (0.04 in) wide on a stalk or "claw" about 4 mm (0.2 in) long. There is an insect-like callus about 3.5 mm (0.1 in) long with dark reddish brown, hair-like glands in a central band. The tip of the callus is about 2 mm (0.08 in) wide with shiny black glands. The column is light green to whitish with purplish spots, strongly curved, with two pairs of curved wings. Flowering occurs from December to February.

== Taxonomy and naming ==
Arthrochilus prolixus was first formally described in 1991 by David Jones from a specimen collected near Wauchope. The description was published in Australian Orchid Research. The specific epithet (prolixus) is a Latin word meaning "stretched out long", referring to the long labellum calli.

== Distribution and habitat ==
The wispy elbow orchid grows with grass and shrubs in forest between Manly in New South Wales and south-eastern Queensland. The largest population is in the Bulahdelah district. One colony has established itself in rotting sawdust at a sawmill.

== Ecology ==
As with other Arthrochilus orchids, A. prolixus is pollinated by male thynnid wasps of the genus Arthrothynnus although the species involved is not known. It also reproduces asexually by producing new tubers.
