= Epidendrum dendrobii =

Scientific classification
- Kingdom: Plantae
- Clade: Tracheophytes
- Clade: Angiosperms
- Clade: Monocots
- Order: Asparagales
- Family: Orchidaceae
- Subfamily: Epidendroideae
- Genus: Epidendrum
- Subgenus: Epidendrum subg. Pleuranthium
- Species: E. dendrobii

Binomial name
- Epidendrum dendrobii Rchb.f. 1850

Synonyms
- Epidendrum pileatum (Rchb.f.) Rchb.f. 1861

Species of orchid

Epidendrum dendrobii is a terrestrial species of reed-stemmed Epidendrum of the Orchidaceae which grows on steep slopes in tropical montane cloud forests of Cochabamba, Bolivia and Venezuela at altitudes near 2.6 km.

== Description ==
Epidendrum dendrobii is a terrestrial, sympodial orchid with tall (~1.2 m.) slender stems without any swelling, covered with foliaceous sheaths, most tipped with long, acute, slightly keeled, distichous leaves. The inflorescences are short (1.5 cm) lateral racemes, or sometimes (Reichenbach, 1861) panicles, carrying six to eight waxy-textured flowers arising between spathaceous bracts. The sepals are somewhat broader than the petals. The lip is trilobate, with the lateral lobes larger than the median lobe. The callus consists of two lamina at the apex of the column, followed by three broad keels.

== Taxonomic quibbles ==
According to Kew (In July, 2009), E. dendrobii and E. pileatum (the type species of the subgenus E. subg. Pleuranthium) are the same species. Both Reichenbach, 1861 and Dodson & Vásquez, 1989, distinguish between E. dendrobii, with smaller yellowish flowers, and E. pileatum, with larger (> 1 cm) greenish flowers with each floral segment rolled backwards from the long axis (pileate).
