= Arthrochilus dockrillii =

Green truffle orchid

Scientific classification
- Kingdom: Plantae
- Clade: Tracheophytes
- Clade: Angiosperms
- Clade: Monocots
- Order: Asparagales
- Family: Orchidaceae
- Subfamily: Orchidoideae
- Tribe: Diurideae
- Genus: Arthrochilus
- Species: A. dockrillii

Binomial name
- Arthrochilus dockrillii Lavarack

Synonyms
- Phoringopsis dockrillii (Lavarack) D.L.Jones & M.A.Clem.

Species of flowering plant

Arthrochilus dockrillii, commonly known as the green truffle orchid, is a species of flowering plant in the orchid family (Orchidaceae) and is endemic to Tropical North Queensland. It has one or two dark green leaves at its base and up to twenty five greenish, insect-like flowers with red glands on its labellum. This species is known by some authorities as Phoringopsis dockrillii. There is a single record of this species from Papua New Guinea.

== Description ==
Arthrochilus dockrillii is a terrestrial, perennial, deciduous, sympodial herb with an underground tuber which produces daughter tubers on the end of root-like stolons. It one or two dark green, linear to lance-shaped leaves, usually one larger than the other, each leaf 60–200 mm (2–8 in) long and 6–10 mm (0.2–0.4 in) wide. Between five and twenty five greenish, insect-like flowers 10–12 mm (0.4–0.5 in) long are well spaced along a flowering stem 150–300 mm (6–10 in) tall. The dorsal sepal is oblong to spatula-shaped, 5–6 mm (0.20–0.24 in) long and about 2 mm (0.08 in) wide. The lateral sepals are linear, 5.5–6.5 mm (0.22–0.26 in) long and about 2 mm (0.08 in) wide. The petals are narrow linear, 5–6 mm (0.20–0.24 in) long and about 1.5 mm (0.06 in) wide and slightly curved. The petals and lateral sepals turn backwards against the ovary and are inconspicuous. The labellum is about 5.5 mm (0.2 in) long and 2.5 mm (0.1 in) wide and held above the flower. The callus is about 1.5 mm (0.06 in) long, covered with a few spiky, bristly hair-like glands and the tip is about 3 mm (0.1 in) long. Flowering occurs from January to August.

== Taxonomy and naming ==
Arthrochilus dockrillii was first formally described in 1975 by Bill Lavarack from a specimen collected near Innisfail and the description was published in Proceedings of the Royal Society of Queensland. In 2002 David Jones and Mark Clements transferred the species to the genus Phoringopsis as Phoringopsis dockrillii, a name accepted by the Australian Plant Census but not by Plants of the World Online.

== Distribution and habitat ==
The green truffle orchid grows in coastal and near-coastal forests and scrub between Hopevale and Bramston Beach with a disjunct population near Kuranda. There is a single collection from Papua New Guinea.

== Ecology ==
As with other Arthrochilus orchids, A. dockrillii is pollinated by male thynnid wasps of the genus Arthrothynnus although the species involved is not known. It also reproduces asexually by producing new tubers.
