= Arthrochilus lavarackianus =

Glaucous truffle orchid

Scientific classification
- Kingdom: Plantae
- Clade: Tracheophytes
- Clade: Angiosperms
- Clade: Monocots
- Order: Asparagales
- Family: Orchidaceae
- Subfamily: Orchidoideae
- Tribe: Diurideae
- Genus: Arthrochilus
- Species: A. lavarackianus

Binomial name
- Arthrochilus lavarackianus Lavarack

Synonyms
- Phoringopsis lavarackiana (D.L.Jones) Lavarack

Species of flowering plant

Arthrochilus lavarackianus, commonly known as the glaucous truffle orchid, is a species of flowering plant in the orchid family (Orchidaceae) and is endemic to the Torres Strait and Tropical North Queensland. It has one or two bluish green leaves at its base and up to fifteen greenish, insect-like flowers with red glands on its mushroom-like labellum. This species is known by some authorities as Phoringopsis lavarackiana.

== Description ==
A. lavarackianus is a terrestrial, perennial, deciduous, sympodial herb with an underground tuber which produces daughter tubers on the end of root-like stolons. It one or two bluish green, linear to lance-shaped leaves, usually one larger than the other, each leaf 50–200 mm (2–8 in) long and 5–15 mm (0.2–0.6 in) wide. Between three and fifteen greenish, insect-like flowers 14–16 mm (0.55–0.63 in) long are well spaced along a flowering stem 100–300 mm (4–10 in) tall. The dorsal sepal is linear to spatula-shaped, 8–9 mm (0.3–0.4 in) long, about 2 mm (0.08 in) wide and curves forward towards the column. The lateral sepals are linear to oblong, 6–7 mm (0.24–0.28 in) long and about 1 mm (0.04 in) wide. The petals are linear, 7–8 mm (0.28–0.31 in) long and about 0.5 mm (0.02 in) wide and curved. The petals and lateral sepals turn backwards against the ovary and are inconspicuous. The labellum is mushroom-shaped, 6–7 mm (0.2–0.3 in) long and about 2.5 mm (0.1 in) wide and held above the flower. The callus is about 2.5 mm (0.1 in) long, mop-like, covered with spiky, bristly hair-like glands. The tip is of the callus is strap-like and about 3 mm (0.1 in) long. The column is 2.5 mm (0.1 in) long with two pairs of wings. Flowering occurs from January to August.

== Taxonomy and naming ==
The glaucous truffle orchid was first formally described in 2004 by David Jones and given the name Phoringopsis lavarackiana from a specimen collected on Moa Island. The description was published in The Orchadian. In 2006, Bill Lavarack changed the name of this orchid to Arthrochilus lavarackianus.

== Distribution and habitat ==
The glaucous truffle orchid grows in scrub on Moa Island and in Tropical North Queensland as far south as the Mutjati country of Shelburne Bay.

== Ecology ==
As with other Arthrochilus orchids, A. lavarackianus is pollinated by male thynnid wasps of the genus Arthrothynnus although the species involved is not known. It also reproduces asexually by producing new tubers.
