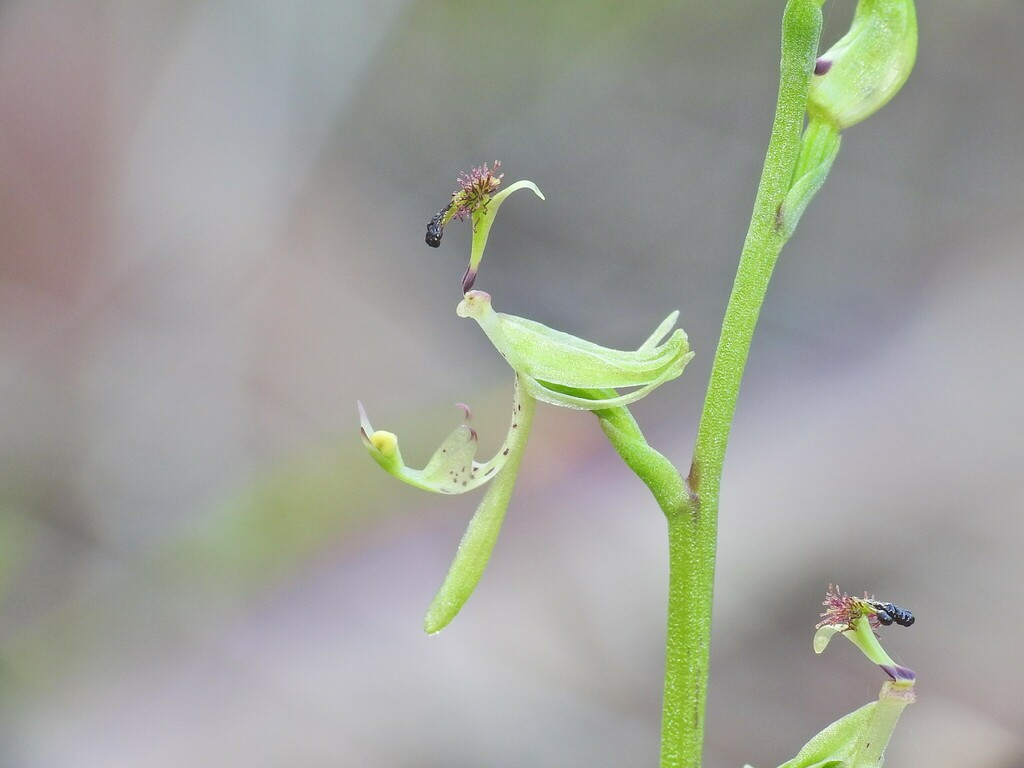

Scientific classification
- Kingdom: Plantae
- Clade: Tracheophytes
- Clade: Angiosperms
- Clade: Monocots
- Order: Asparagales
- Family: Orchidaceae
- Subfamily: Orchidoideae
- Tribe: Diurideae
- Genus: Arthrochilus
- Species: A. irritabilis

Binomial name
- Arthrochilus irritabilis F.Muell.

Synonyms
- Drakaea irritabilis (F.Muell.) Rchb.f.; Spiculaea irritabilis (F.Muell.) Schltr.

= Arthrochilus irritabilis =

Clubbed elbow orchid

Species of flowering plant

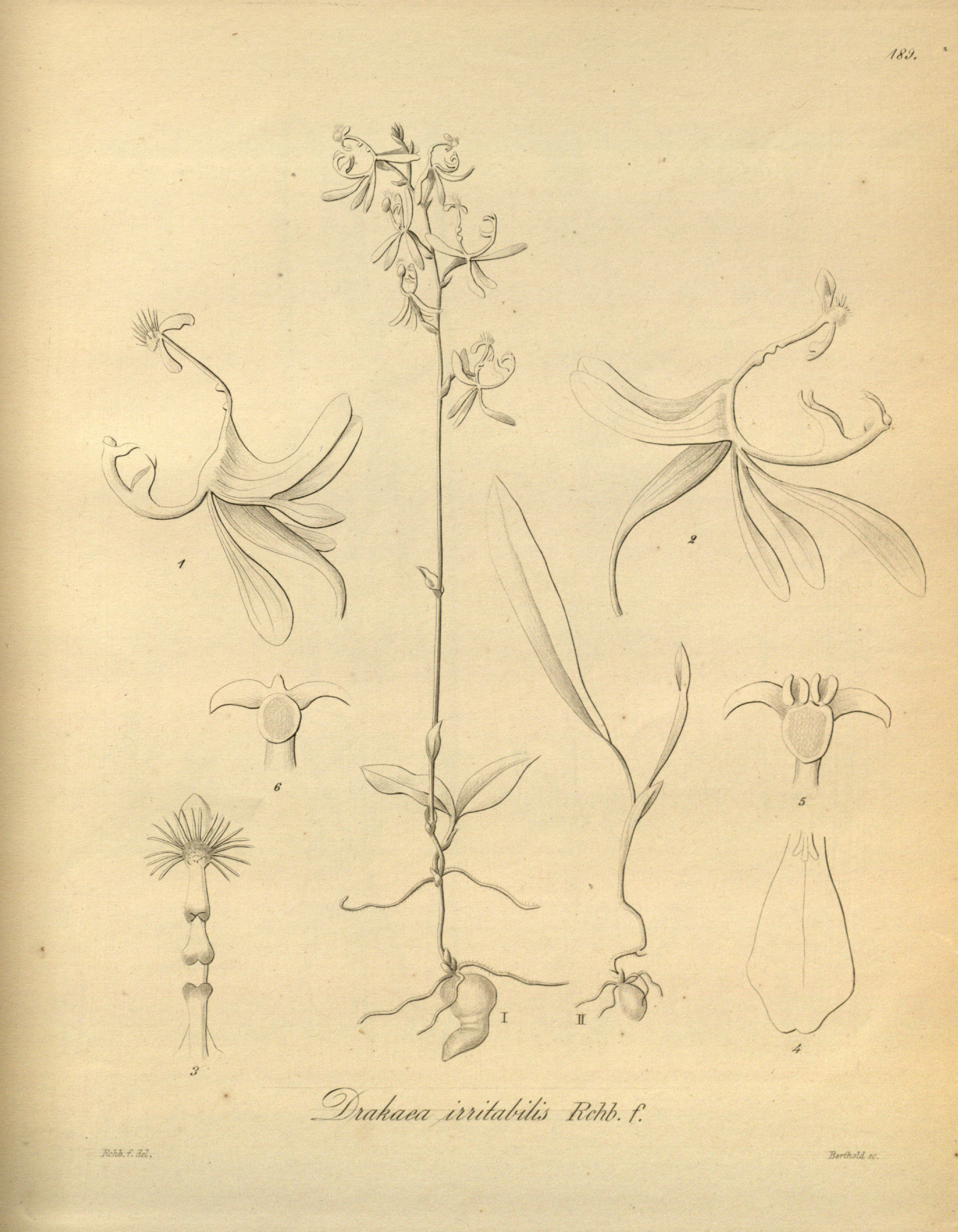
Illustration of Drakaea irritabilis (syn. Arthrochilus irritabilis) from Reichenbach's Xenia Orchidacae.

Arthrochilus irritabilis, commonly known as clubbed elbow orchid, is a flowering plant in the orchid family (Orchidaceae) and is endemic to Queensland. It has up to five leaves and up to thirty light greenish or reddish, insect-like flower with reddish, hair-like glands on its labellum. There is a single record of this species from Papua New Guinea.

== Description ==
Arthrochilus irritabilis is a terrestrial, perennial, deciduous, sympodial herb with an underground tuber which produces daughter tubers on the end of root-like stolons. It has between three and five narrow lance-shaped, bluish green leaves 30–80 mm (1–3 in) long and 8–14 mm (0.3–0.6 in) wide on side growth at the base of the flowering stem. Between five and thirty light greenish or reddish insect-like flowers, 10–14 mm (0.4–0.6 in) long are borne on a thin, wiry, green to reddish flowering stem 120–350 mm (5–10 in) tall. The dorsal is 8–11 mm (0.3–0.4 in) long, about 2 mm (0.08 in) wide, folded lengthwise near the tip and directed more or less downwards. The lateral sepals are oblong, curved, 5–7 mm (0.2–0.3 in) long and about 1 mm (0.04 in) wide. The petals are linear, 5–7 mm (0.2–0.3 in) long and about 1 mm (0.04 in) wide. The lateral sepals and petals all turn downwards towards the ovary. The labellum is about 5 mm (0.2 in) long, 1 mm (0.04 in) wide with a reddish base. The labellum callus is insect-like, about 2.5 mm (0.1 in) long with its central area crowded with hair-like, reddish or purplish glands. The tip of the callus is about 1 mm (0.04 in) long and covered with shiny, blackish glands. The column is curved, 7–8 mm (0.28–0.31 in) long with two pairs of curved triangular wings. Flowering occurs from November to February.

== Taxonomy and naming ==
Arthrochilus irritabilis was first formally described in 1858 by Ferdinand von Mueller and the description was published in Fragmenta phytographiae Australiae from a specimen collected "from wooded hills near Moreton Bay". The specific epithet (irritabilis) is a Latin word meaning "easily excited".

== Distribution and habitat ==
The clubbed elbow orchid grows in woodland, forest and heath, sometimes forming large colonies. It is widespread and common between Ingham and Brisbane. There is a single record from Papua New Guinea.

== Ecology ==
As with other Arthrochilus orchids, A. irritabilis is pollinated by male thynnid wasps of the genus Arthrothynnus although the species involved is not known. It also reproduces asexually by producing new tubers.
