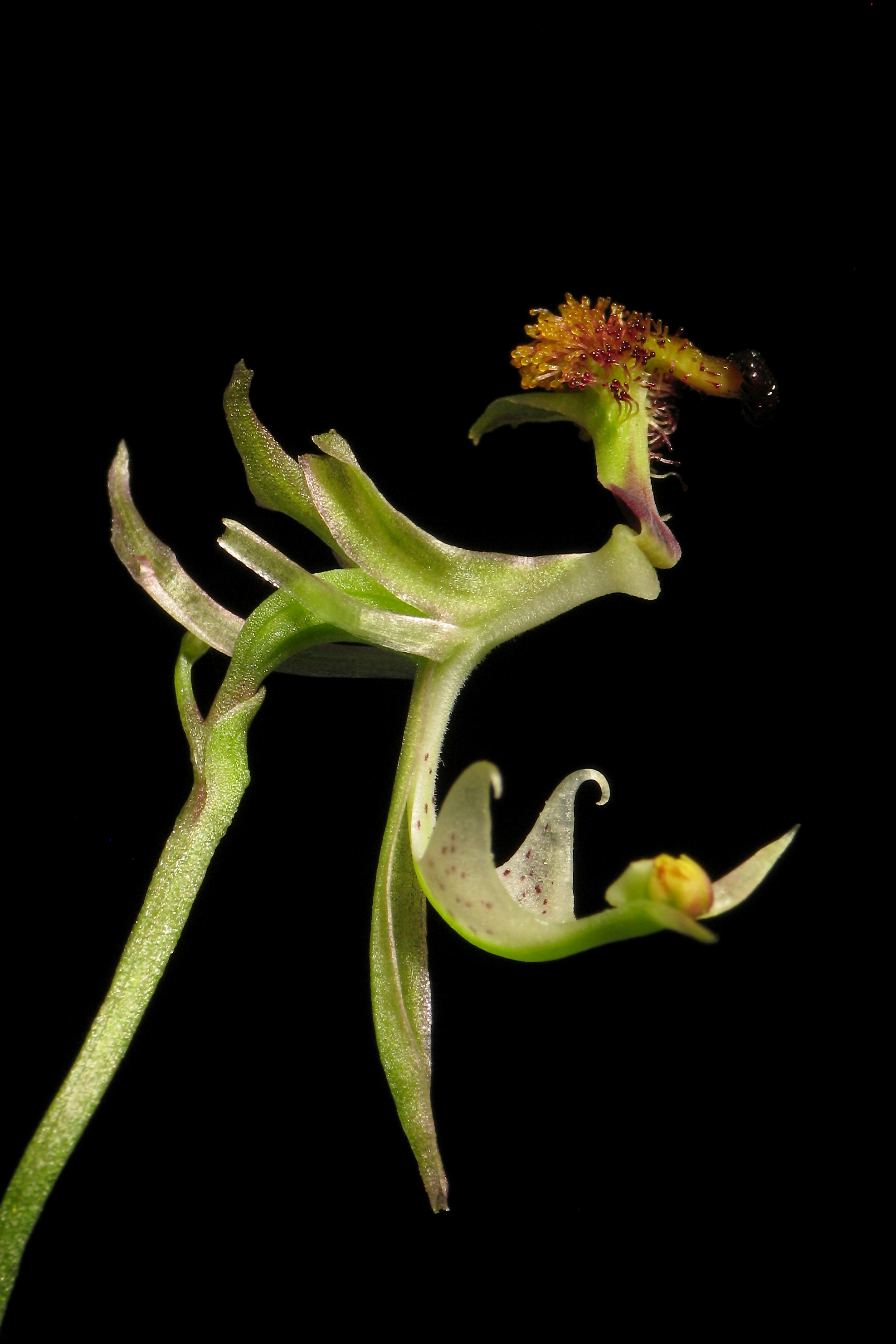
- Arthrochilus latipes in Kakadu National Park

Scientific classification
- Kingdom: Plantae
- Clade: Tracheophytes
- Clade: Angiosperms
- Clade: Monocots
- Order: Asparagales
- Family: Orchidaceae
- Subfamily: Orchidoideae
- Tribe: Diurideae
- Genus: Arthrochilus
- Species: A. latipes

Binomial name
- Arthrochilus latipes D.L.Jones

= Arthrochilus latipes =

Robust elbow orchid

Species of flowering plant

Arthrochilus latipes, commonly known as robust elbow orchid, is a flowering plant in the orchid family (Orchidaceae) and is endemic to the "Top End" of the Northern Territory in Australia. Each plant has from two to four ground-hugging leaves and between three and fifteen flowers during the wet season and the species often forms spreading colonies on sandstone escarpments. Like others in the genus, the flowers are pollinated by a species of thynnid wasp.

== Description ==
Arthrochilus latipes is a terrestrial, perennial, deciduous, sympodial herb with an underground tuber which produces daughter tubers on the end of root-like stolons. There are two to four lance-shaped, ground-hugging, dull green leaves at the base of the plant, each leaf 25–70 mm (1–3 in) long and 8–26 mm (0.3–1 in) wide.

The inflorescence is a raceme, 10–30 cm (4–10 in) tall with three to about fifteen flowers, each 15–25 mm (0.6–1 in) long with and green with brownish glands on the labellum. The dorsal sepal curves downwards, is narrow egg-shaped to spoon-shaped, about 14 mm (0.6 in) long, 3–4 mm (0.1–0.2 in) wide and is wrapped around one-quarter of the column. The lateral sepals and petals are turned back towards the ovary, the sepals about 10 mm × 3.5 mm (0.4 in × 0.1 in) and the petals about the same length but narrower. The labellum is about 7.5 mm × 1.5 mm (0.3 in × 0.06 in) but wider at the base, greenish with a dark purple blotch at its base. The callus resembles a flightless female thynnid wasp and is covered with short, shiny, club-shaped, yellowish brown to brown structures called "calli". The tip of the callus is bulb-shaped and covered with shiny black glands. The column is shaped like a semi-circle, about 10 mm (0.4 in) long with its inner surface hairy. One pair of column wings are triangular and point forwards, while the other pair on the side of the column are erect and have a hooked summit. Flowering occurs from October to January and is followed by a dehiscent, oval-shaped capsule about 10 mm (0.4 in) long.

== Taxonomy and naming ==
Arthrochilus latipes was first formally described in 1991 by David Jones and the description was published in Australian Orchid Research from a specimen collected in Radon Gorge in Kakadu National Park. The specific epithet (latipes) is derived from the Latin words latus meaning "broad" and pes meaning "foot" referring to the broad base of the labellum of this orchid species.

== Distribution and habitat ==
Robust elbow orchid is found in the Top End of the Northern Territory, east of Darwin, growing on rocky outcrops and sandstone escarpments, especially in the Kakadu and Litchfield National Parks.

== Ecology ==
As with other Arthrochilus orchids, robust elbow orchid is pollinated by males thynnid wasps of the genus Arthrothynnus although the species involved is not known. It also reproduces asexually by producing new tubers.
