= Arthrochilus stenophyllus =

Narrow-leaved elbow orchid

Scientific classification
- Kingdom: Plantae
- Clade: Tracheophytes
- Clade: Angiosperms
- Clade: Monocots
- Order: Asparagales
- Family: Orchidaceae
- Subfamily: Orchidoideae
- Tribe: Diurideae
- Genus: Arthrochilus
- Species: A. stenophyllus

Binomial name
- Arthrochilus stenophyllus D.L.Jones

Species of flowering plant

Arthrochilus stenophyllus, commonly known as the narrow-leaved elbow orchid, is a flowering plant in the orchid family (Orchidaceae) and is endemic to Tropical North Queensland. It has a rosette of dull green leaves on side growth at its base and up to fifteen pale green, insect-like flowers with dark red to brownish glands on its labellum.

== Description ==
Arthrochilus stenophyllus is a terrestrial, perennial, deciduous, sympodial herb with an underground tuber that produces daughter tubers on the end of root-like stolons. It has a rosette of between two and five linear to narrow lance-shaped leaves on side growth at the base of the flowering stem, each leaf 10–25 mm (0.4–1 in) long, 3–5 mm (0.1–0.2 in) wide and lying flat on the ground. Between three and fifteen pale green, insect-like flowers 8–12 mm (0.3–0.5 in) long are borne on a flowering stem 60–250 mm (2–10 in) tall. The dorsal sepal is linear to spatula-shaped, 7–8 mm (0.28–0.31 in) long, about 1 mm (0.04 in) wide and partly wrapped around the base of the column. The lateral sepals are lance-shaped but curved, 3.5–4.5 mm (0.14–0.18 in) long and about 1 mm (0.04 in) wide. The petals are also linear and curved, 5–5.5 mm (0.20–0.22 in) long and about 0.5 mm (0.02 in) wide. The lateral sepals and petals are turned back against the ovary. The labellum is green with a dark red blotch at its base, about 4.5 mm (0.2 in) long and 0.5 mm (0.02 in) wide on a stalk or "claw" about 3 mm (0.1 in) long. There is an insect-like callus about 3 mm (0.1 in) long with a few reddish to reddish brown, hair-like glands in a central band. The column is about 7 mm (0.3 in), curved, light green with a few purplish spots and has two pairs of curved wings. Flowering occurs from December to February.

== Taxonomy and naming ==
Arthrochilus stenophyllus was first formally described in 1991 by David Jones from a specimen collected south of Cardwell. The description was published in Australian Orchid Research. The specific epithet (stenophyllus) is derived from the Ancient Greek words stenos meaning "narrow" and phyllon meaning "leaf", referring to the narrow rosette leaves.

== Distribution and habitat ==
The narrow-leaved elbow orchid grows with sedges and shrubs in sparse Melaleuca viridiflora woodland near Cardwell.

== Ecology ==
As with other Arthrochilus orchids, A. stenophyllus is pollinated by male thynnid wasps of the genus Arthrothynnus although the species involved is not known. It also reproduces asexually by producing new tubers.
