= Arthrochilus rosulatus =

Rosetted elbow orchid

Scientific classification
- Kingdom: Plantae
- Clade: Tracheophytes
- Clade: Angiosperms
- Clade: Monocots
- Order: Asparagales
- Family: Orchidaceae
- Subfamily: Orchidoideae
- Tribe: Diurideae
- Genus: Arthrochilus
- Species: A. prolixus

Binomial name
- Arthrochilus prolixus D.L.Jones

Species of flowering plant

Arthrochilus rosulatus, commonly known as rosetted elbow orchid, is a flowering plant in the orchid family (Orchidaceae) and is endemic to Tropical North Queensland. It has a rosette of bluish green leaves surrounding its base and up to fifteen pale green, insect-like flowers with dark red glands on its labellum.

== Description ==
Arthrochilus rosulatus is a terrestrial, perennial, deciduous, sympodial herb with an underground tuber that produces daughter tubers on the end of root-like stolons. It has a rosette of between three and four elliptic to lance-shaped leaves surrounding the base of the flowering stem, each leaf 10–35 mm (0.4–1 in) long and 8–12 mm (0.3–0.5 in) wide. Between two and fifteen pale green, insect-like flowers 8–13 mm (0.3–0.5 in) long are borne on a flowering stem 70–150 mm (3–6 in) tall. The dorsal sepal is linear to egg-shaped with the narrower end towards the base, 7.5–9 mm (0.30–0.35 in) long, about 2 mm (0.08 in) wide and partly wrapped around the base of the column. The lateral sepals are oblong to lance-shaped with the narrower end towards the base, 5.5–6.5 mm (0.2–0.3 in) long and about 2 mm (0.08 in) wide. The petals are linear, 6.5–7.5 mm (0.26–0.30 in) long and 1 mm (0.04 in) wide and curved. The lateral sepals and petals are turned back against the ovary. The labellum is light green with a dark purplish blotch at its base, about 5 mm (0.2 in) long, 1 mm (0.04 in) wide on a short stalk or "claw". There is an insect-like callus about 3.5 mm (0.1 in) long with short, reddish brown, hair-like glands in a central band. The tip of the callus is about 1.5 mm (0.06 in) wide with shiny dark reddish or black glands. The column is translucent with a few purplish spots, curved, and has two pairs of curved wings. Flowering occurs from November to July.

== Taxonomy and naming ==
Arthrochilus rosulatus was first formally described in 1991 by David Jones from a specimen collected near Rossville. The description was published in Australian Orchid Research. The specific epithet (rosulatus) is a Latin word meaning "of roses", referring to the leaf rosette surrounding the base of the flowering stem, contrasting with others in the genus that have them on side growth.

== Distribution and habitat ==
The rosetted elbow orchid grows in forest in the vicinity of Cooktown, sometimes forming spreading colonies.

== Ecology ==
As with other Arthrochilus orchids, A. rosulatus is pollinated by male thynnid wasps of the genus Arthrothynnus although the species involved is not known. It also reproduces asexually by producing new tubers.
