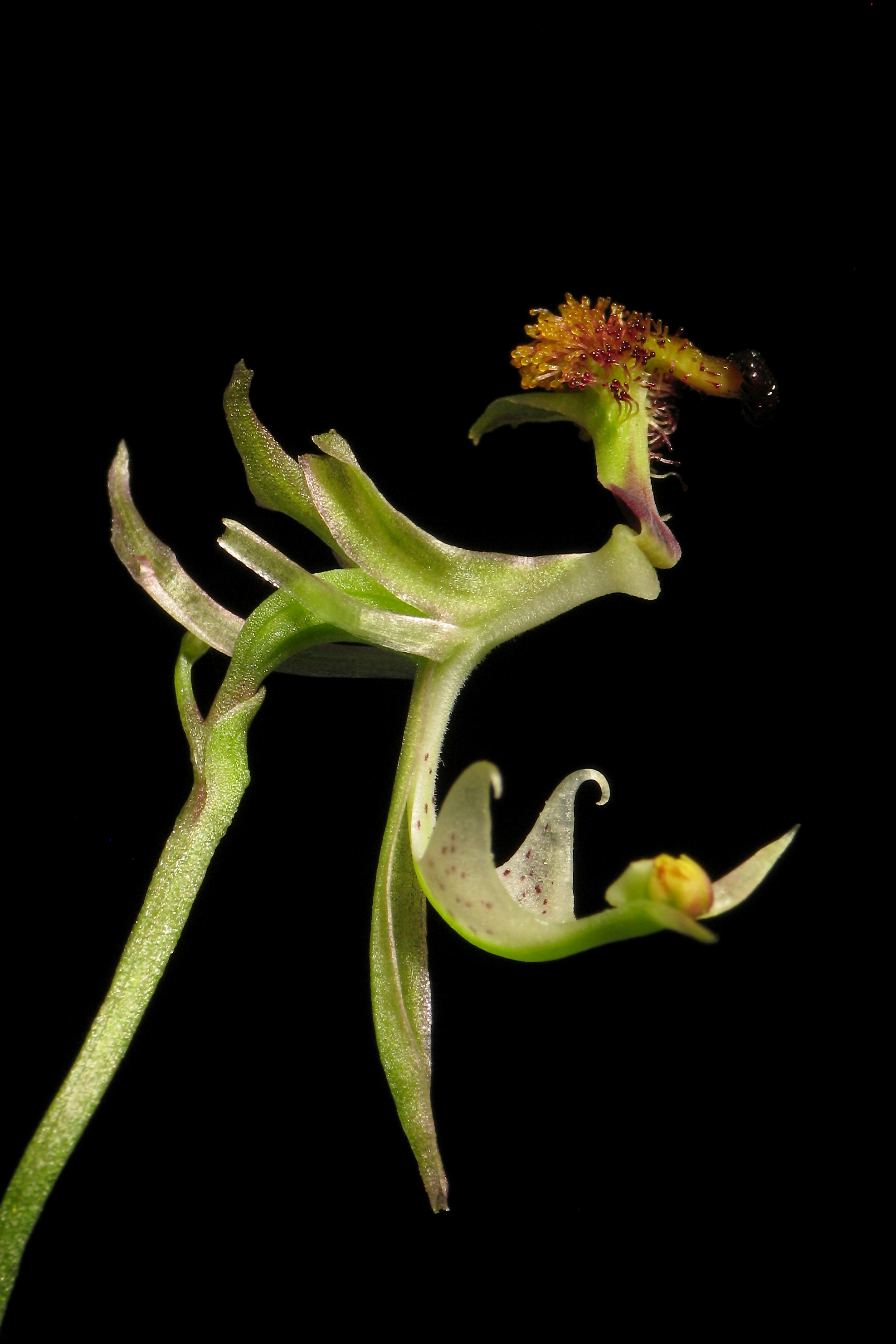
- Arthrochilus latipes in Kakadu National Park

Scientific classification
- Kingdom: Plantae
- Clade: Tracheophytes
- Clade: Angiosperms
- Clade: Monocots
- Order: Asparagales
- Family: Orchidaceae
- Subfamily: Orchidoideae
- Tribe: Diurideae
- Subtribe: Drakaeinae
- Genus: Arthrochilus; F.Muell.

Synonyms
- Phoringopsis D.L.Jones & M.A.Clem.; Thynninorchis D.L.Jones & M.A.Clem.

= Arthrochilus =

Elbow orchids

Genus of flowering plants

Arthrochilus, commonly called elbow orchids, is a genus of about fifteen species of flowering plants from the orchid family (Orchidaceae) and is found in Australia and New Guinea. The flowers are pollinated by male thynnid wasps which attempt to mate with the flower and are held in place by hooks while the pollinium is transferred between insect and flower.

== Description ==
Orchids in the genus Arthrochilus are terrestrial, perennial, deciduous, sympodial herbs usually with a few inconspicuous, fine roots and a single oval-shaped tuber lacking a protective fibrous sheath. (A. huntianus lacks a true tuber.) Some species form colonies, reproducing asexually from daughter tubers formed on the end of root-like stolons. The stem is short, erect and unbranched with thin, leaf-like cataphylls at each node. There are up to six leaves at or near the base of the plant, sometimes forming a rosette around the stem.

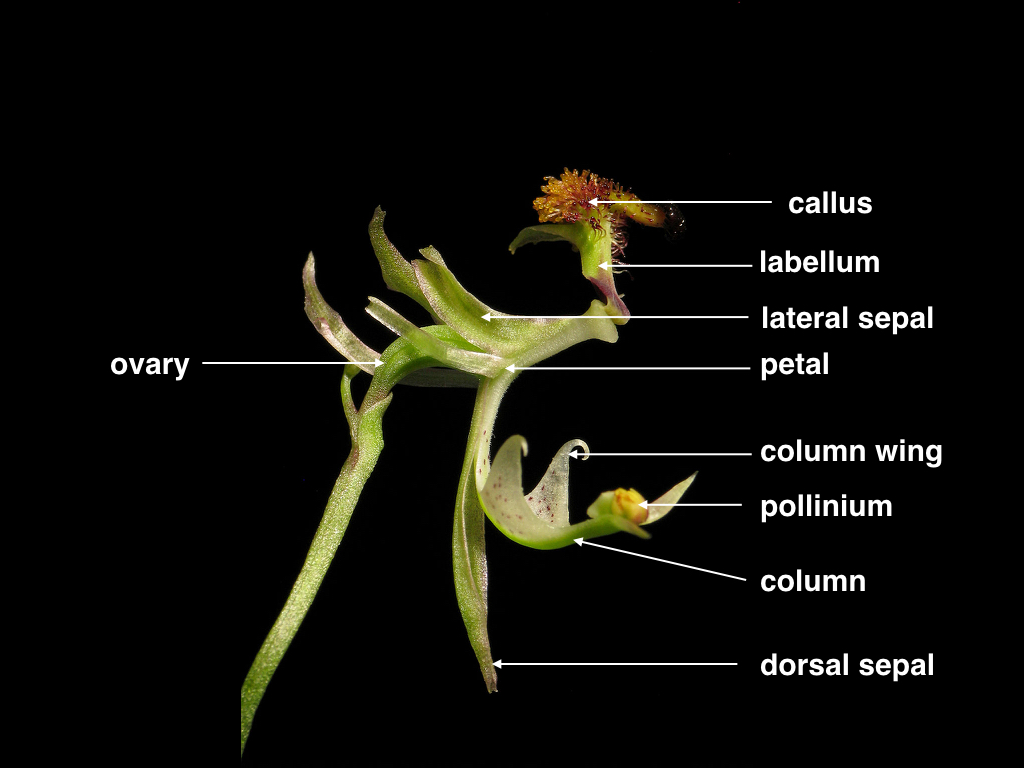
Labelled image

The inflorescence is a raceme with a few to many non-resupinate, dull-coloured flowers on a wiry stalk. The dorsal sepal is similar to or larger than the lateral sepals and its sides curve inwards. The lateral sepals and petals are attached the base of the column, the petals similar to, but smaller than the sepals. The highly modified labellum is dominated by the callus and is hinged to the column by a flexible "claw". The callus is ornamented with feathery cilia and club-shaped structures which gives the labellum the form of a wingless, female wasp. The column has two pairs of wings, two which surround the sexual parts of the flower and two larger hook-like wings either side of the column. Elbow orchids mainly flower in summer and the fruit that follows flowering is a glabrous dehiscent capsule containing a large number of winged seeds.

== Taxonomy and naming ==
The genus Arthrochilus was first formally described in 1858 by Ferdinand von Mueller and the description was published in Fragmenta phytographiae Australiae. Mueller described Arthrochilus irritabilis at the same time and it is regarded as the type species. The scientific name of the genus is derived from the Ancient Greek words arthron meaning "joint" and cheilos meaning "lip" referring to the jointed labellum.

== Distribution and habitat ==
Elbow orchids are found in all states of Australia except Western Australia and in southern Papua New Guinea and on the Torres Strait Islands. The majority of elbow orchid species occur in tropical regions but A. huntianus grows in eastern Australia with the subspecies nothofagicola occurring in Tasmania. The tropical species grow and flower in the summer wet season, usually growing in sand in forest or woodland.

== Ecology ==
The labellum of elbow orchids mimics wingless female thynnid wasps of the Superfamily Vespoidea, Family Thynnidae. In its attempt to fly off with the dummy female, the insect is thrust head-first against the column where the hooked wings hold the insect in place long enough for the pollinia to stick to its back. If it is carrying pollinia from another flower, the pollinia are crushed against the stigma. For three species of elbow orchid, a single species of wasp from the genus Arthrothynnus has been identified. In the case of some tropical species, the wasps struggle so violently with the labellum that the organ is often torn off. Some other orchids similarly employ thynnid wasps as pollinators but only Arthrochilus flowers have restraining hooks on the labellum.

== Species list ==
The following is a list of species recognised by the Plants of the World Online as at October 2025:

- Arthrochilus apectus D.L.Jones - untidy elbow orchid (Qld.)
- Arthrochilus aquilus D.L.Jones - dark elbow orchid (Qld.)
- Arthrochilus byrnesii Blaxell - sandstone truffle orchid (N.T., W.A.)
- Arthrochilus corinnae D.L.Jones - swamp elbow orchid (Qld.)
- Arthrochilus dockrillii Lavarack - green truffle orchid (Qld.)
- Arthrochilus huntianus (F.Muell.) Blaxell - common elbow orchid (N.S.W., Tas., Vic., S.A.)
- Arthrochilus irritabilis F.Muell. - clubbed elbow orchid (Qld.)
- Arthrochilus laevicallus Ormerod (Papua New Guinea)
- Arthrochilus latipes D.L.Jones - robust elbow orchid (N.T.)
- Arthrochilus lavarackianus (D.L.Jones) Lavarack - glaucous truffle orchid (Qld.)
- Arthrochilus oreophilus D.L.Jones - montane elbow orchid (Qld.)
- Arthrochilus prolixus D.L.Jones - wispy elbow orchid (N.S.W., Qld.)
- Arthrochilus rosulatus D.L.Jones - rosetted elbow orchid (Qld.)
- Arthrochilus sabulosus D.L.Jones - spotted elbow orchid (Qld.)
- Arthrochilus stenophyllus D.L.Jones - narrow-leaved elbow orchid (Qld.)

== See also ==
- List of Orchidaceae genera
