= Arthrochilus apectus =

Untidy elbow orchid

Scientific classification
- Kingdom: Plantae
- Clade: Embryophytes
- Clade: Tracheophytes
- Clade: Spermatophytes
- Clade: Angiosperms
- Clade: Monocots
- Order: Asparagales
- Family: Orchidaceae
- Subfamily: Orchidoideae
- Tribe: Diurideae
- Genus: Arthrochilus
- Species: A. apectus

Binomial name
- Arthrochilus apectus D.L.Jones

Species of flowering plant

Arthrochilus oreophilus, commonly known as untidy elbow orchid, is a flowering plant in the orchid family (Orchidaceae) and is endemic to near the tip of Cape York in Queensland, Australia. It has two or three leaves at its base and up to seven pale green, insect-like flowers with reddish glands on its labellum.

== Description ==
Arthrochilus apectus is a terrestrial, perennial, deciduous, sympodial herb with an underground tuber which produces daughter tubers on the end of root-like stolons. It has two or three leaves at its base, each leaf 20–50 mm (0.8–2 in) long and 4–10 mm (0.2–0.4 in) wide. Between three and seven insect-like flowers 9–11 mm (0.35–0.43 in) long are borne on a flowering stem 180–260 mm (7–10 in) tall. The dorsal sepal is 9–11 mm (0.35–0.43 in) long, about 1.5 mm (0.06 in) wide and the lateral sepals are 7–8.5 mm (0.28–0.33 in) long and about 1.5 mm (0.06 in) wide. The petals are 8–9 mm (0.3–0.4 in) long, about 0.5 mm (0.02 in) wide. The petals and lateral sepals turn backwards against the ovary. The labellum has a purple base and is about 3.5 mm (0.1 in) long, 1 mm (0.04 in) on a stalk or "claw" 3.5 mm (0.1 in) long. The callus is about 3.5 mm (0.1 in) long with its central part covered with many tiny, shiny, hair-like glands and the tip is about 1 mm (0.04 in) wide with shiny black glands. Flowering occurs from November to February.

== Taxonomy and naming ==
Arthrochilus apectus was first formally described in 2004 by David Jones from a specimen collected in the Heathlands Reserve near the tip of Cape York. The description was published in The Orchadian. The specific epithet (apectus) is from the Ancient Greek word apektos meaning "uncombed" or "unkempt".

== Distribution and habitat ==
Untidy elbow orchid grows in forest on the northern part of the Cape York Peninsula.

== Ecology ==
As with other Arthrochilus orchids, A. apectus is pollinated by male thynnid wasps of the genus Arthrothynnus although the species involved is not known. It also reproduces asexually by producing new tubers.
