= Arthrochilus corinnae =

Swamp elbow orchid

Scientific classification
- Kingdom: Plantae
- Clade: Embryophytes
- Clade: Tracheophytes
- Clade: Spermatophytes
- Clade: Angiosperms
- Clade: Monocots
- Order: Asparagales
- Family: Orchidaceae
- Subfamily: Orchidoideae
- Tribe: Diurideae
- Genus: Arthrochilus
- Species: A. corinnae

Binomial name
- Arthrochilus corinnae D.L.Jones

Species of flowering plant

Arthrochilus corinnae, commonly known as swamp elbow orchid, is a flowering plant in the orchid family (Orchidaceae) and is endemic to the northern part of Cape York in Queensland, Australia. It has two or three dull bluish green leaves near its base and up to twelve pale green, insect-like flowers with shiny yellowish glands on its labellum.

== Description ==
Arthrochilus corinnae is a terrestrial, perennial, deciduous, sympodial herb with an underground tuber which produces daughter tubers on the end of root-like stolons. Non-flowering plants have a rosette of leaves, which in flowering plants are on a short side stem. There are two or three dull bluish green leaves, each leaf 5–25 mm (0.2–1 in) long and 3–7 mm (0.1–0.3 in) wide. Between three and twelve insect-like flowers 9–14 mm (0.4–0.6 in) long are borne on a flowering stem 120–350 mm (5–10 in) tall. The dorsal sepal is linear to egg-shaped with the narrower end towards the base, 8–11 mm (0.3–0.4 in) long, about 2 mm (0.08 in) wide and folded lengthwise near the tip. The lateral sepals are oblong, curved, 5–6.5 mm (0.20–0.26 in) long and about 2 mm (0.08 in) wide. The petals are linear and curved, 6–7 mm (0.24–0.28 in) long and about 1 mm (0.04 in) wide. The petals and lateral sepals turn backwards against the ovary. The labellum is about 5.5 mm (0.2 in) long and about 1 mm (0.04 in) with a dark purple base. The callus is insect-like, about 4 mm (0.2 in) long with its central part crowded with many shiny, yellowish red hair-like glands and the tip is about 1.5 mm (0.06 in) wide with shiny black glands. Flowering occurs from November to February.

== Taxonomy and naming ==
Arthrochilus corinnae was first formally described in 2004 by David Jones from a specimen collected on Cape York. The description was published in The Orchadian.

== Distribution and habitat ==
Swamp elbow orchid grows in low-lying swampy areas with Melaleuca and Pandanus species on the Cape York Peninsula.

== Ecology ==
As with other Arthrochilus orchids, A. corinnae is pollinated by male thynnid wasps of the genus Arthrothynnus although the species involved is not known. It also reproduces asexually by producing new tubers.
