= Arthrochilus laevicallus =

Arthrochilus laevigatus

Scientific classification
- Kingdom: Plantae
- Clade: Tracheophytes
- Clade: Angiosperms
- Clade: Monocots
- Order: Asparagales
- Family: Orchidaceae
- Subfamily: Orchidoideae
- Tribe: Diurideae
- Genus: Arthrochilus
- Species: A. byrnesii

Binomial name
- Arthrochilus byrnesii Ormerod

Species of flowering plant

Arthrochilus laevicallus is a species of flowering plant in the orchid family (Orchidaceae) and is endemic to Papua New Guinea. It is leafless but has up to seven green, insect-like flowers with dark reddish glands on its labellum.

== Description ==
Arthrochilus laevicallus is a terrestrial, perennial, deciduous, sympodial herb with an underground tuber which produces daughter tubers on the end of root-like stolons. It lacks leaves but has between four and seven green, insect-like flowers on a flowering stem 105–175 mm (4–7 in) tall. The dorsal sepal is strap-shaped to lance-shaped with the narrower end towards the base, about 11 mm (0.4 in) long and 2 mm (0.08 in) wide. The lateral sepals are strap-shaped but curved, about 8.5 mm (0.33 in) long and 2 mm (0.08 in) wide. The petals are curved linear, 8 mm (0.31 in) long and 1 mm (0.04 in) wide and curved. The petals and lateral sepals turn backwards against the ovary. The labellum is about 6 mm (0.2 in) long and 1.5 mm (0.06 in) and held above the flower. The callus is about 3 mm (0.1 in) long with its central part covered with short, bristly hair-like glands. Flowering occurs in January.

== Taxonomy and naming ==
Arthrochilus laevicallus was first formally described in 2011 by Paul Ormerod from a specimen collected near Tarara on the Wassi Kussa River in the west of Papua New Guinea. The description was published in The Orchadian.

== Distribution and habitat ==
This elbow orchid grows in wet flats in forest in New Guinea.
