= Arthrochilus oreophilus =

Montane elbow orchid

Scientific classification
- Kingdom: Plantae
- Clade: Embryophytes
- Clade: Tracheophytes
- Clade: Spermatophytes
- Clade: Angiosperms
- Clade: Monocots
- Order: Asparagales
- Family: Orchidaceae
- Subfamily: Orchidoideae
- Tribe: Diurideae
- Genus: Arthrochilus
- Species: A. oreophilus

Binomial name
- Arthrochilus oreophilus D.L.Jones

Synonyms
- Spiculaea irritabilis auct. non (F.Muell.) Schltr.: Dockrill, A.W. (1969)

Species of flowering plant

Arthrochilus oreophilus, commonly known as montane elbow orchid, is a flowering plant in the orchid family (Orchidaceae) and is endemic to higher places in far north Queensland, Australia. It has a rosette of leaves at its base and up to fifteen green, insect-like flowers with dark reddish brown glands on its labellum.

== Description ==
Arthrochilus oreophilus is a terrestrial, perennial, deciduous, sympodial herb with an underground tuber that produces daughter tubers on the end of root-like stolons. It has a rosette of between two and five lance-shaped leaves at its base, each leaf 20–45 mm (0.8–2 in) long and about 10–18 mm (0.4–0.7 in) wide. Between two and fifteen insect-like flowers 12–15 mm (0.5–0.6 in) long are borne on a fleshy, dark reddish brown flowering stem 80–200 mm (3–8 in) tall. The dorsal sepal is spatula-shaped to egg-shaped with the narrower end towards the base, 9–10 mm (0.35–0.39 in) long, about 2 mm (0.08 in) wide, folded lengthwise and wrapped around the base of the column. The lateral sepals are lance-shaped but curved, 6–7 mm (0.2–0.3 in) long, about 2 mm (0.08 in) wide and turn downwards towards the ovary. The petals are linear, curved, about 7 mm (0.3 in) long, 1 mm (0.04 in) wide and turned backwards against the ovary. The labellum is about 6 mm (0.2 in) long and pale green with a dark purple base. There is an insect-like callus about 3.5 mm (0.1 in) long with dark reddish brown, hair-like glands in a central band on the labellum. The column is green with purplish spots, curved, about 7 mm (0.3 in) long with two curved wings above and below it. Flowering occurs from November to January.

== Taxonomy and naming ==
Arthrochilus oreophilus was first formally described in 1991 by David Jones from a specimen collected near Herberton. The description was published in Australian Orchid Research. The specific epithet (oreophilus) is derived from the Ancient Greek words oros meaning "mountain" or "hill" and philos meaning "beloved" or "dear", referring to the habitat preference of this orchid.

== Distribution and habitat ==
Montane elbow orchid grows in woodland in forest on the ranges and tablelands at altitudes above 1,000 m (3,000 ft) between the Cedar Bay National Park and the Evelyn Tableland. It is most common on the Atherton Tableland.

== Ecology ==
As with other Arthrochilus orchids, A. oreophilus is pollinated by male thynnid wasps of the genus Arthrothynnus although the species involved is not known. It also reproduces asexually by producing new tubers.
