= Arthrochilus aquilus =

Dark elbow orchid

Scientific classification
- Kingdom: Plantae
- Clade: Embryophytes
- Clade: Tracheophytes
- Clade: Spermatophytes
- Clade: Angiosperms
- Clade: Monocots
- Order: Asparagales
- Family: Orchidaceae
- Subfamily: Orchidoideae
- Tribe: Diurideae
- Genus: Arthrochilus
- Species: A. aquilus

Binomial name
- Arthrochilus aquilus D.L.Jones

Species of flowering plant

Arthrochilus aquilus, commonly known as dark elbow orchid, is a flowering plant in the orchid family (Orchidaceae) and is endemic to the northern part of Cape York in Queensland, Australia. It has up to five dark green leaves at its base and up to fifteen pale green, insect-like flowers with dark reddish black glands on its labellum.

== Description ==
Arthrochilus aquilus is a terrestrial, perennial, deciduous, sympodial herb with an underground tuber which produces daughter tubers on the end of root-like stolons. It has between two and five dark green leaves at its base, each leaf 20–50 mm (0.8–2 in) long and 7–14 mm (0.3–0.6 in) wide. Between three and fifteen insect-like flowers 9–13 mm (0.4–0.5 in) long are borne on a flowering stem 200–350 mm (8–10 in) tall. The dorsal sepal is 7–8.5 mm (0.28–0.33 in) long, about 1 mm (0.04 in) wide and the lateral sepals are 6–7.5 mm (0.24–0.30 in) long and 1–1.5 mm (0.04–0.06 in) wide. The petals are 6.5–7.5 mm (0.26–0.30 in) long and about 0.5 mm (0.02 in) wide. The petals and lateral sepals turn backwards against the ovary. The labellum is about 6 mm (0.2 in) long and 1 mm (0.04 in) on a stalk or "claw" 4 mm (0.2 in) long. The callus is about 2.5 mm (0.1 in) long with its central part crowded with many shiny, dark reddish hair-like glands and the tip is about 1 mm (0.04 in) wide with shiny black glands. Flowering occurs from November to February.

== Taxonomy and naming ==
Arthrochilus aquilus was first formally described in 2004 by David Jones from a specimen collected in the Heathlands Reserve near the tip of Cape York. The description was published in The Orchadian. The specific epithet (aquilus) is a Latin word meaning "dark coloured" or "blackish".

== Distribution and habitat ==
Dark elbow orchid grows in forest on the northern part of the Cape York Peninsula.

== Ecology ==
As with other Arthrochilus orchids, A. aquilus is pollinated by male thynnid wasps of the genus Arthrothynnus although the species involved is not known. It also reproduces asexually by producing new tubers.
