= Phoringopsis byrnesii =

Sandstone truffle orchid

Scientific classification
- Kingdom: Plantae
- Clade: Tracheophytes
- Clade: Angiosperms
- Clade: Monocots
- Order: Asparagales
- Family: Orchidaceae
- Subfamily: Orchidoideae
- Tribe: Diurideae
- Genus: Phoringopsis
- Species: P. byrnesii

Binomial name
- Phoringopsis byrnesii Blaxell

Synonyms
- Arthrochilus byrnesii (Blaxell)

Species of flowering plant

Phoringopsis byrnesii, commonly known as sandstone truffle orchid, is a rare species of flowering plant in the orchid family (Orchidaceae) and is endemic to the far north-west of Australia. It has three dark green leaves at its base and up to fifteen greenish, insect-like flowers with dark reddish black glands on its labellum.

== Description ==
Phoringopsis byrnesii is a terrestrial, perennial, deciduous, sympodial herb with an underground tuber which produces daughter tubers on the end of root-like stolons. It usually has three dark green leaves, one large and one or two smaller, each leaf 150–300 mm (6–10 in) long and 15–20 mm (0.6–0.8 in) wide. Between five and fifteen greenish, insect-like flowers 12–14 mm (0.5–0.6 in) long are well spaced along a flowering stem 150–300 mm (6–10 in) tall. The dorsal sepal is 8–10 mm (0.3–0.4 in) long, about 3 mm (0.1 in) wide and the lateral sepals are 6.5–7.5 mm (0.26–0.30 in) long and about 2.5 mm (0.1 in) wide. The petals are 6–7 mm (0.24–0.28 in) long and about 1.5 mm (0.06 in) wide and curved. The petals and lateral sepals turn backwards against the ovary and are inconspicuous. The labellum is about 5.5 mm (0.2 in) long and 2.5 mm (0.1 in) and held above the flower. The callus is about 5.5 mm (0.2 in) long, about 2.5 mm (0.1 in) wide, covered with many spiky, bristly hair-like glands with a glandular tip is about 2.5 mm (0.1 in) wide. Flowering occurs in March and April.

== Taxonomy and naming ==
This species was first formally described in 1972 by Donald Blaxell and given the name Arthrochilus byrnesii in Contributions from the New South Wales National Herbarium from a specimen collected by Norman Byrnes near the South Alligator River. In 2002 David Jones and Mark Clements changed the name of this orchid to Phoringopsis byrnesii in The Orchadian.

== Distribution and habitat ==
Sandstone truffle orchid is a rarely seen species which grows around sandstone boulders and in tussocks of spinifex in the north of the Northern Territory and the Kimberley region of Western Australia.

== Ecology ==
As with other Phoringopsis orchids, P. byrnesii is pollinated by male thynnid wasps of the genus Arthrothynnus although the species involved is not known. It also reproduces asexually by producing new tubers.
