= Arthrochilus sabulosus =

Spotted elbow orchid

Scientific classification
- Kingdom: Plantae
- Clade: Tracheophytes
- Clade: Angiosperms
- Clade: Monocots
- Order: Asparagales
- Family: Orchidaceae
- Subfamily: Orchidoideae
- Tribe: Diurideae
- Genus: Arthrochilus
- Species: A. sabulosus

Binomial name
- Arthrochilus sabulosus D.L.Jones

Species of flowering plant

Arthrochilus sabulosus, commonly known as spotted elbow orchid, is a flowering plant in the orchid family (Orchidaceae) and is endemic to Tropical North Queensland and Horn Island. It has a rosette of dull green leaves on side growth at its base and up to fifteen pale green, insect-like flowers with reddish to brownish glands on its labellum.

== Description ==
Arthrochilus sabulosus is a terrestrial, perennial, deciduous, sympodial herb with an underground tuber that produces daughter tubers on the end of root-like stolons. It has a rosette of between two and three egg-shaped to lance-shaped leaves on side growth at the base of the flowering stem, each leaf 10–35 mm (0.4–1 in) long and 6–15 mm (0.2–0.6 in) wide. Between three and fifteen pale green, insect-like flowers 10–15 mm (0.4–0.6 in) long are borne on a flowering stem 120–370 mm (5–10 in) tall. The dorsal sepal is linear but tapered, 10–12 mm (0.4–0.5 in) long, about 2 mm (0.08 in) wide and partly wrapped around the base of the column. The lateral sepals are lance-shaped but curved, 7.5–8 mm (0.30–0.31 in) long and about 2 mm (0.08 in) wide. The petals are also linear and curved, 8–9 mm (0.31–0.35 in) long and about 1 mm (0.04 in) wide. The lateral sepals and petals are turned back against the ovary. The labellum is green with a dark purplish blotch at its base, about 6 mm (0.2 in) long and 1 mm (0.04 in) wide on a short stalk or "claw". There is an insect-like callus about 4.5 mm (0.2 in) long with reddish brown, hair-like glands in a central band. The tip of the callus is about 1.5 mm (0.06 in) wide and brownish with shiny black glands. The column is about 9 mm (0.4 in), curved, light green with a few purplish spots and has two pairs of curved wings. Flowering occurs from November to July.

== Taxonomy and naming ==
Arthrochilus sabulosus was first formally described in 1991 by David Jones from a specimen collected on Horn Island. The description was published in Australian Orchid Research. The specific epithet (sabulosus) is a Latin word meaning "full of sand" or "sandy", referring to the sandy places where this orchid tends to grow.

== Distribution and habitat ==
Spotted elbow orchid grows in sand dunes with scrub vegetation. It is found on the northern part of the Cape York Peninsula and on Horn Island in the Torres Strait.

== Ecology ==
As with other Arthrochilus orchids, A. sabulosus is pollinated by male thynnid wasps of the genus Arthrothynnus although the species involved is not known. It also reproduces asexually by producing new tubers.
