= Epidendrum subg. Pleuranthium =

Scientific classification
- Kingdom: Plantae
- Clade: Tracheophytes
- Clade: Angiosperms
- Clade: Monocots
- Order: Asparagales
- Family: Orchidaceae
- Subfamily: Epidendroideae
- Genus: Epidendrum
- Subgenus: Epidendrum subg. Pleuranthium; Rchb.f.

Subgenus of orchids

The subgenus Pleuranthium of the genus Epidendrum of the Orchidaceae is distinguished from the other subgenera by having lateral inflorescences on the reed-like stems of the sympodial plant. With the exception of subgenus Psilanthemum Klotzsch, all of the remaining subgenera produce terminal inflorescences.

H. G. Reichenbach recognized four species in this subgenus. Kew has concluded that one of these, E. pileatum, is a synonym for E. dendrobii (page numbers refer to H. G. Reichenbach 1861):

- E. aggregatum Lindl. 1841 (p. 415)
- E. cauliflorum Lindl. 1838 (p. 415)
- E. dendrobii Rchb.f. 1850 (pp. 414, 415)
