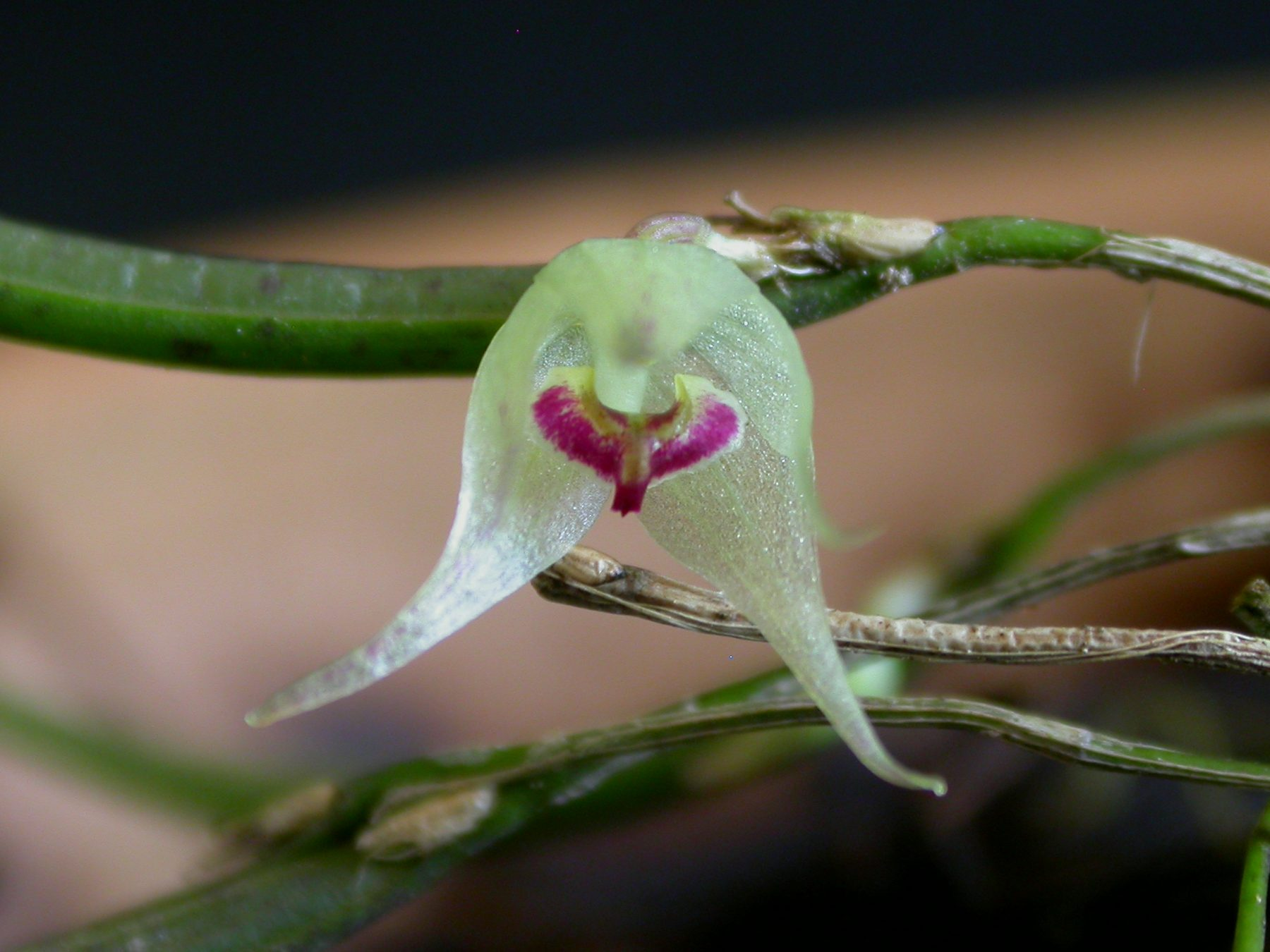

Scientific classification
- Kingdom: Plantae
- Clade: Tracheophytes
- Clade: Angiosperms
- Clade: Monocots
- Order: Asparagales
- Family: Orchidaceae
- Subfamily: Epidendroideae
- Genus: Octomeria
- Species: O. octomeriantha

Binomial name
- Octomeria octomeriantha (Hoehne) Pabst

Synonyms
- Pleurothallis octomeriantha Hoehne (basionym); Octomeria elobata Schltr. ex Pabst

= Octomeria octomeriantha =

Species of orchid

Octomeria octomeriantha is a species of orchid endemic to Brazil (São Paulo and Paraná).
