= Octomeria lilliputana =

Conservation status
- CITES Appendix II

Scientific classification
- Kingdom: Plantae
- Clade: Embryophytes
- Clade: Tracheophytes
- Clade: Spermatophytes
- Clade: Angiosperms
- Clade: Monocots
- Order: Asparagales
- Family: Orchidaceae
- Subfamily: Epidendroideae
- Genus: Octomeria
- Species: O. liliputana

Binomial name
- Octomeria liliputana W.Forst., F.Barros & V.C.Souza

Species of flowering plant

Octomeria lilliputana is a species of flowering plant in the family Orchidaceae. It is an epiphyte with fleshy leaves, and rose-coloured sepals and petals. The species is native to southern Brazil, and listed in Appendix II of CITES.

Octomeria lilliputana was described in 2013, and named after the fiction island of Lilliput.

== Taxonomy ==
The species was named by Wellington Forster, Fábio de Barros, and Vinicius Castro Souza in 2013.

== Distribution ==
Octomeria lilliputana is native to the wet tropical biome of Paraná, southern Brazil. It is known only from its type locality, in Marumbi Peak State Park. The species grows in primary rainforests.

== Description ==
Octomeria lilliputana is an epiphytic herb around 5 centimetres (2.0 in) tall. The stem is 0.5–1.5 centimetres (0.20–0.59 in) long, and encased by two or three thin sheaths.

The leaf is fleshy, narrowly elliptical to linear-elliptical, 1.3–3.2 centimetres (0.51–1.26 in) long, and 0.3–0.4 centimetres (0.12–0.16 in) wide. The leaf margin is smooth. The leaf lacks a stem.

The inflorescence is a fascicle with one or two flowers. The inflorescence stem is cylindrical, and 0.5–0.6 millimetres (0.020–0.024 in) long. The flowers are in an inverted position because the stem is twisted 180°. The flower stem is around 3 millimetres (0.12 in) long. The ovary is around 2 millimetres (0.079 in) long.

The sepals are rose-coloured and translucent. The sepals have three veins, and a smooth margin. The dorsal sepal is slightly concave, narrowly elliptical, around 6 millimetres (0.24 in) long, and around 2 millimetres (0.079 in) wide. The lateral sepals are slightly concave, lanceolate and slightly sickle-shaped, 6 millimetres (0.24 in) long, and around 2 millimetres (0.079 in) wide. The petals are rose coloured, flat, around 5.5 millimetres (0.22 in) long, around 1 millimetre (0.039 in) wide, and have three veins. The petals are elliptical to narrowly lanceolate, and have a smooth margin. The lip is slightly fleshy, around 4 millimetres (0.16 in) long, and has three lobes. The column is whitish-rose, slender, and around 2.1 millimetres (0.083 in) long. The lip is hinged to the column foot. Flowering specimens have been collected in October.

Octomeria lilliputana is similar to Octomeria cochlearis, Octomeria montana, Octomeria ochroleuca, and Octomeria rhodoglossa.

== Conservation ==
Octomeria lilliputana is listed in Appendix II of CITES. There are no quotas or suspensions in place for the species.

== Etymology ==
The specific epithet lilliputana refers to Lilliput, a fictional island with very small inhabitants, that appears in the novel Gulliver's Travels.
