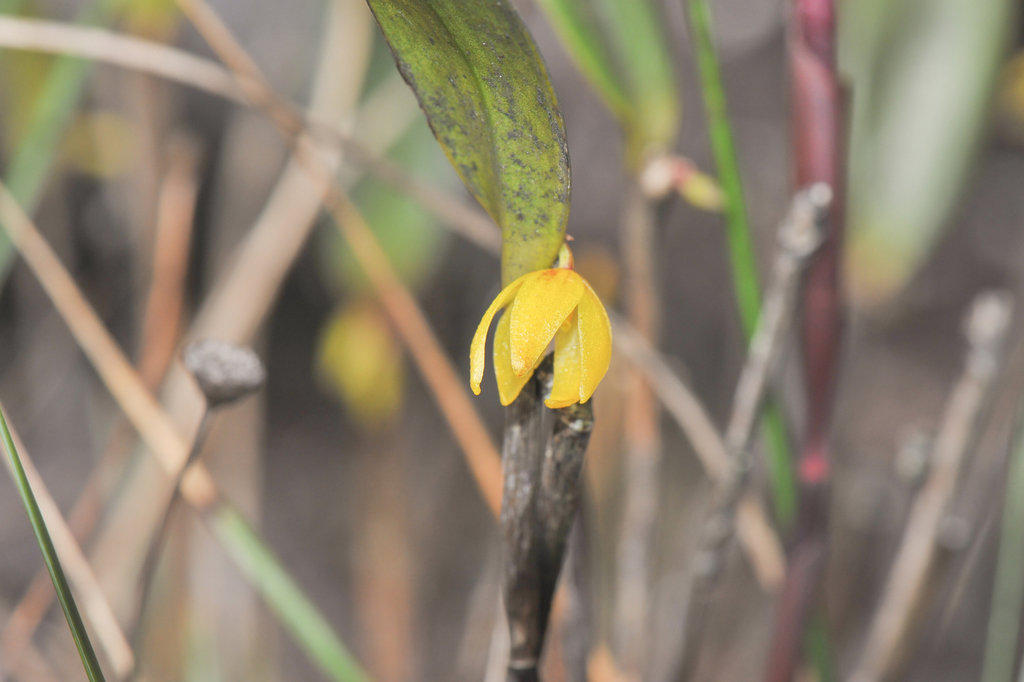

Conservation status
- CITES Appendix II

Scientific classification
- Kingdom: Plantae
- Clade: Tracheophytes
- Clade: Angiosperms
- Clade: Monocots
- Order: Asparagales
- Family: Orchidaceae
- Subfamily: Epidendroideae
- Genus: Octomeria
- Species: O. connellii

Binomial name
- Octomeria connellii Rolfe

= Octomeria connellii =

Species of flowering plant

Octomeria connellii is a species of flowering plant in the family Orchidaceae. It is an epiphyte or lithophyte with ovate-lanceolate sepals and petals. The species is native to South America.

Octomeria connellii was described in 1901, and is listed in Appendix II of CITES.

== Taxonomy ==
The species was described by Robert Allen Rolfe in 1901.

== Distribution ==
Octomeria connellii is native to the wet tropical biome of Venezuela, Guyana, and Brazil. It was discovered on Mount Roraima.

== Description ==
Octomeria connellii is an epiphyte or lithophyte. The stems are 4–12 inches (10–30 cm) long, and have four or five tubular sheaths. The leaves are oblong-lanceolate, fleshy or thickly leathery, and 2–4 inches (5.1–10.2 cm) long.

The flowers are medium-sized, and have short stems. The sepals and petals are ovate-lanceolate, and sub-obtuse. The labellum is oblong, concave, and has minutely crenulate edges. The column is club-shaped.

Octomeria connellii is comparable to Octomeria grandiflora, though the former has shorter leaves, longer stems, and a differently structured labellum.

== Conservation ==
Octomeria connellii is listed in Appendix II of CITES. There are no quotas or suspensions in place for the species.
