= Octomeria wilsoniana =

Conservation status
- CITES Appendix II

Scientific classification
- Kingdom: Plantae
- Clade: Tracheophytes
- Clade: Angiosperms
- Clade: Monocots
- Order: Asparagales
- Family: Orchidaceae
- Subfamily: Epidendroideae
- Genus: Octomeria
- Species: O. wilsoniana

Binomial name
- Octomeria wilsoniana Hoehne

Species of flowering plant

Octomeria wilsoniana is a species of flowering plant in the family Orchidaceae. It is an epiphyte native to Brazil. The species was described in 1929, and is listed in Appendix II of CITES.

== Distribution ==
Octomeria wilsoniana is native to the seasonally dry tropical biome of São Paulo, Brazil. The species inhabits tropical rainforests.

== Taxonomy ==
Octomeria wilsoniana was described by Frederico Carlos Hoehne in 1929.

== Description ==
Octomeria wilsoniana is an epiphytic herb.

== Conservation ==
Octomeria wilsoniana is listed in Appendix II of CITES. There are no quotas or suspensions in place for the species.
