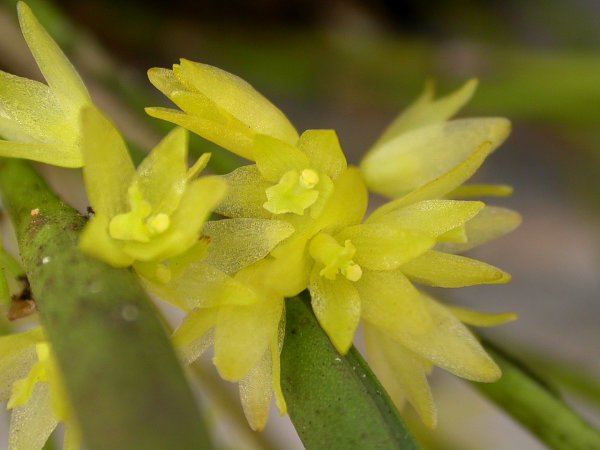

Scientific classification
- Kingdom: Plantae
- Clade: Tracheophytes
- Clade: Angiosperms
- Clade: Monocots
- Order: Asparagales
- Family: Orchidaceae
- Subfamily: Epidendroideae
- Genus: Octomeria
- Species: O. decumbens

Binomial name
- Octomeria decumbens Cogn.

Synonyms
- Octomeria decumbens var. major Pabst

= Octomeria decumbens =

Species of orchid

Octomeria decumbens is a species of orchid native to southern and southeastern Brazil.
