= O. nana =

O. nana may refer to:

- Octomeria nana, an orchid species
- Oreophryne nana, the Camiguin narrow-mouthed frog, a frog species endemic to the Philippines
- Oithona nana, a widespread marine cyclopoid copepod

== See also ==
- Nana (disambiguation)
