= Octomeria pacii =

Scientific classification
- Kingdom: Plantae
- Clade: Embryophytes
- Clade: Tracheophytes
- Clade: Spermatophytes
- Clade: Angiosperms
- Clade: Monocots
- Order: Asparagales
- Family: Orchidaceae
- Subfamily: Epidendroideae
- Genus: Octomeria
- Species: O. pacii

Binomial name
- Octomeria pacii Vélez-Abarca, M.M.Jiménez & Baquero

Species of flowering plant

Octomeria pacii is a species of flowering plant in the family Orchidaceae. It is native to Ecuador's Zamora-Chinchipe Province, and was described in 2021.

Octomeria pacii is an epiphyte with white and magenta flowers. Unlike most species of Octomeria, it may be self-pollinating.

== Taxonomy ==
Octomeria pacii was described in 2021, by Leisberth Vélez-Abarca, Marco M. Jiménez, and Luis E. Baquero. The holotype was collected from the Cordillera del Cóndor, at an elevation of 1,010 metres (3,310 ft).

Octomeria pacii was described alongside Octomeria panguiensis.

== Distribution ==
Octomeria pacii is native to the wet tropical biome of Ecuador. It grows in the montane forests of the Cordillera del Cóndor, under the shade of small trees. The species grows at elevations of around 1,000 metres (3,300 ft).

Octomeria pacii has only been recorded from Ecuador's Zamora-Chinchipe Province.

== Description ==
Octomeria pacii is an epiphyte with slender roots. It grows up to 23 centimetres (9.1 in) high. The leaves are leathery, narrowly elliptical, 8–15 centimetres (3.1–5.9 in) long, and 1.5–2.5 centimetres (0.59–0.98 in) wide.

The inflorescence produces a single flower. The sepals are translucent, white, and suffused with magenta. The dorsal sepal has five veins, and measures 9–11 millimetres (0.35–0.43 in) long by 5–6 millimetres (0.20–0.24 in) wide. The lateral sepals have five veins, are 9–11 millimetres (0.35–0.43 in) long, and 3–4 millimetres (0.12–0.16 in) wide. The petals have three veins, and are white, suffused with magenta. The petals are 10–11 millimetres (0.39–0.43 in) long, and 3–4 millimetres (0.12–0.16 in) wide. The lip has three lobes, is white and magenta, around 6 millimetres (0.24 in) long, and around 3.5 millimetres (0.14 in) wide.

The column is red to purple in colour, and 3–3.5 millimetres (0.12–0.14 in) long. Unlike most other Octomeria, O. pacii may be self-pollinating, and has only a vestigial rostellum. The rostellum prevents self-pollination in most Octomeria.

Octomeria pacii is similar to Octomeria deceptrix, though the species differ in the details of their leaves and flowers.

== Etymology ==
Octomeria pacii is named after Patrick Paci, a "passionate lover of the forests and slipper orchids of Ecuador", who supported the research.
