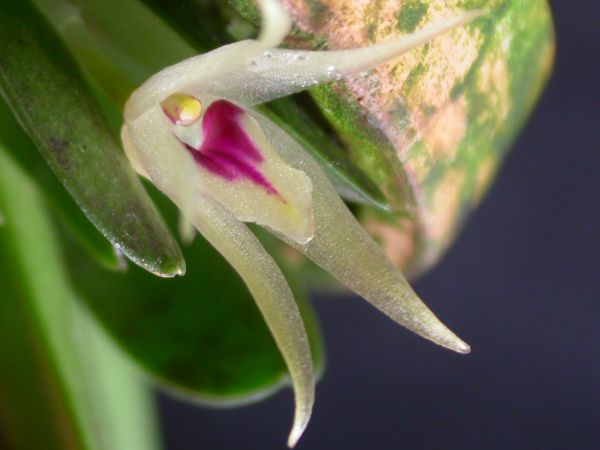

Scientific classification
- Kingdom: Plantae
- Clade: Embryophytes
- Clade: Tracheophytes
- Clade: Spermatophytes
- Clade: Angiosperms
- Clade: Monocots
- Order: Asparagales
- Family: Orchidaceae
- Subfamily: Epidendroideae
- Genus: Octomeria
- Species: O. estrellensis

Binomial name
- Octomeria estrellensis Hoehne

= Octomeria estrellensis =

Species of orchid

Octomeria estrellensis is a species of orchid endemic to southeastern Brazil. Information on the species was first published in 1938 by Frederico Carlos Hoehne.
