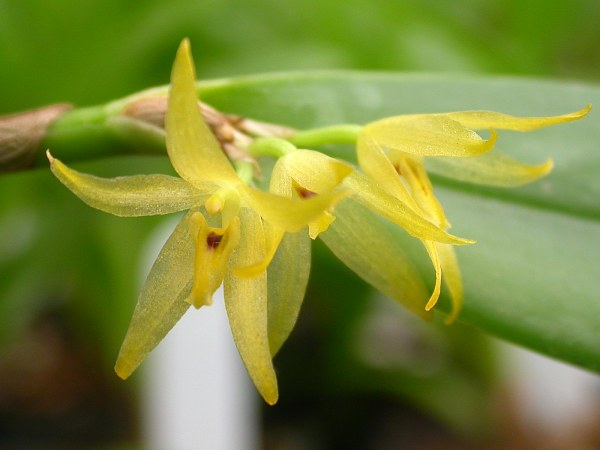

Scientific classification
- Kingdom: Plantae
- Clade: Tracheophytes
- Clade: Angiosperms
- Clade: Monocots
- Order: Asparagales
- Family: Orchidaceae
- Subfamily: Epidendroideae
- Genus: Octomeria
- Species: O. gehrtii

Binomial name
- Octomeria gehrtii Hoehne & Schltr.

= Octomeria gehrtii =

Species of orchid

Octomeria gehrtii is a species of orchid endemic to Brazil (São Paulo to Paraná).
