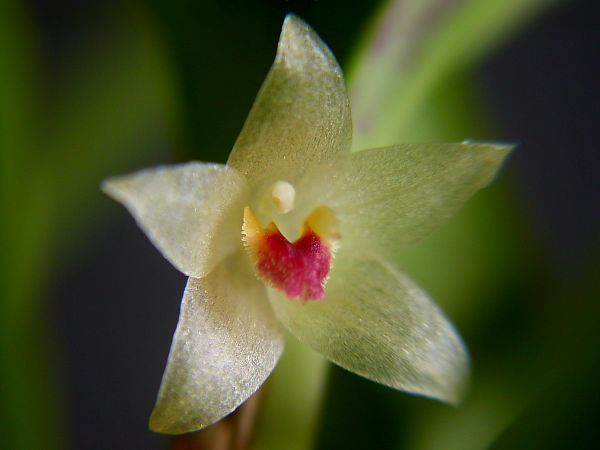

Scientific classification
- Kingdom: Plantae
- Clade: Tracheophytes
- Clade: Angiosperms
- Clade: Monocots
- Order: Asparagales
- Family: Orchidaceae
- Subfamily: Epidendroideae
- Genus: Octomeria
- Species: O. tricolor

Binomial name
- Octomeria tricolor Rchb.f.

Synonyms
- Octomeria albina Barb.Rodr.; Octomeria lacerata Hoehne & Schltr.

= Octomeria tricolor =

Species of orchid

Octomeria tricolor is a species of orchid endemic to southeastern Brazil.
