= Octomeria wawrae =

Conservation status
- CITES Appendix II

Scientific classification
- Kingdom: Plantae
- Clade: Tracheophytes
- Clade: Angiosperms
- Clade: Monocots
- Order: Asparagales
- Family: Orchidaceae
- Subfamily: Epidendroideae
- Genus: Octomeria
- Species: O. wawrae

Binomial name
- Octomeria wawrae Rchb.f. ex Wawra

Species of flowering plant

Octomeria wawrae is a species of flowering plant in the family Orchidaceae. It is an epiphytic herb.

The species was named by Heinrich Gustav Reichenbach in 1888.

== Distribution ==
Octomeria wawrae is native to the seasonally dry tropical biome of south-east Brazil. It is endemic to the country, and found in rocky highlands, deciduous forests, and rainforests.

== Conservation ==
Octomeria wawrae is listed in Appendix II of CITES. There are no quotas or suspensions in place for the species.
