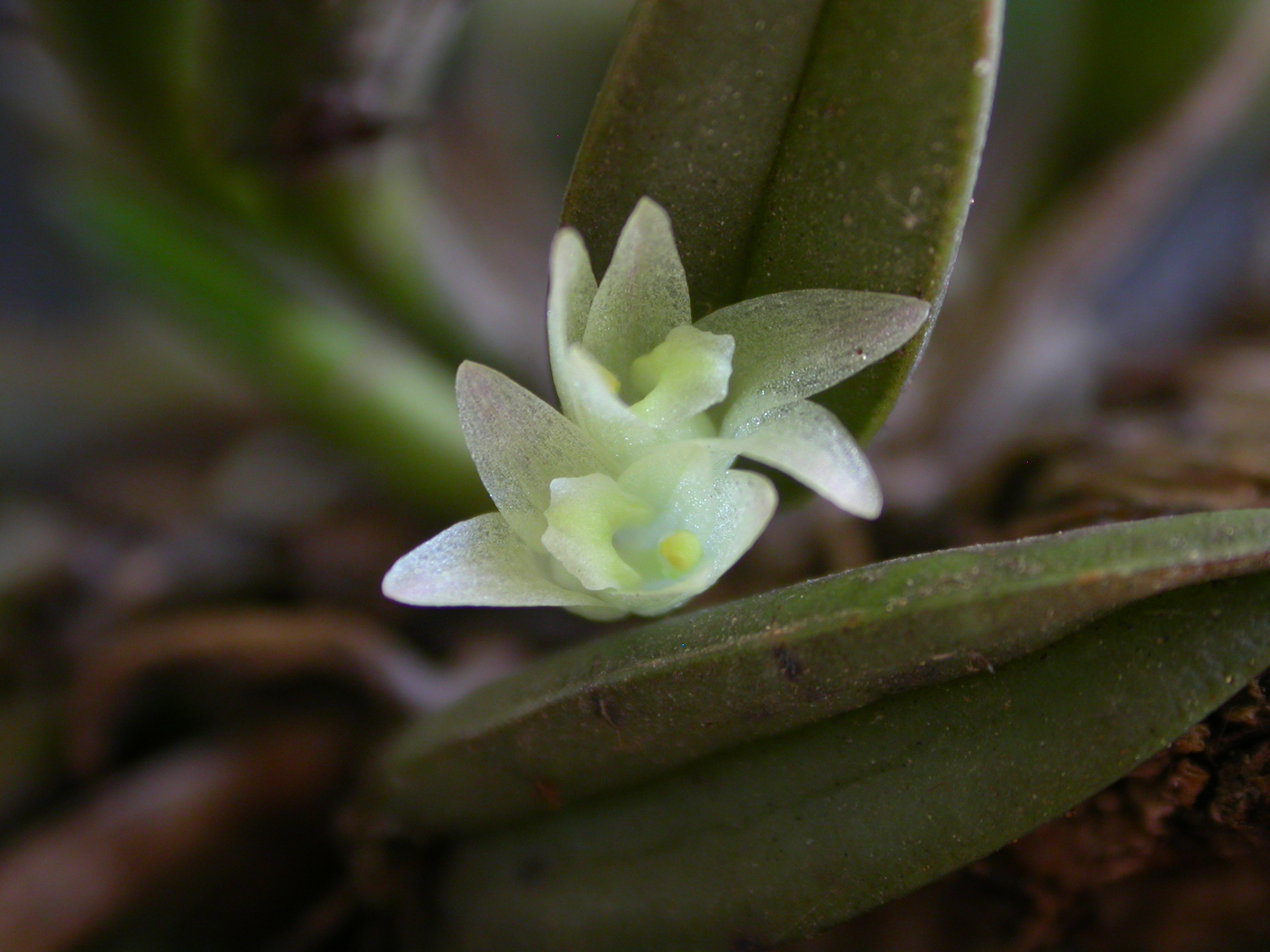

Scientific classification
- Kingdom: Plantae
- Clade: Tracheophytes
- Clade: Angiosperms
- Clade: Monocots
- Order: Asparagales
- Family: Orchidaceae
- Subfamily: Epidendroideae
- Genus: Octomeria
- Species: O. lithophila

Binomial name
- Octomeria lithophila (Barb.Rodr.) Barb.Rodr.

Synonyms
- Gigliolia lithophila Barb.Rodr.

= Octomeria lithophila =

Species of orchid

Octomeria lithophila is a species of orchid endemic to southeastern Brazil.
