= Octomeria ximenae =

Conservation status
- CITES Appendix II

Scientific classification
- Kingdom: Plantae
- Clade: Tracheophytes
- Clade: Angiosperms
- Clade: Monocots
- Order: Asparagales
- Family: Orchidaceae
- Subfamily: Epidendroideae
- Genus: Octomeria
- Species: O. ximenae

Binomial name
- Octomeria ximenae Luer & Hirtz

Species of flowering plant

Octomeria ximenae is a species of flowering plant in the family Orchidaceae. It is an epiphyte.

The species is native to Ecuador. It was described in 2002, and is listed in Appendix II of CITES.

== Distribution ==
Octomeria ximenae is native to the wet tropical biome of Ecuador.

== Taxonomy ==
The species was described in 2002, by Carlyle A. Luer and Alexander Charles Hirtz. The holotype was collected in Morona-Santiago Province, at an elevation of 1,500 metres (4,900 ft).

== Conservation ==
Octomeria ximenae is listed in Appendix II of CITES. There are no quotas or suspensions in place for the species.
