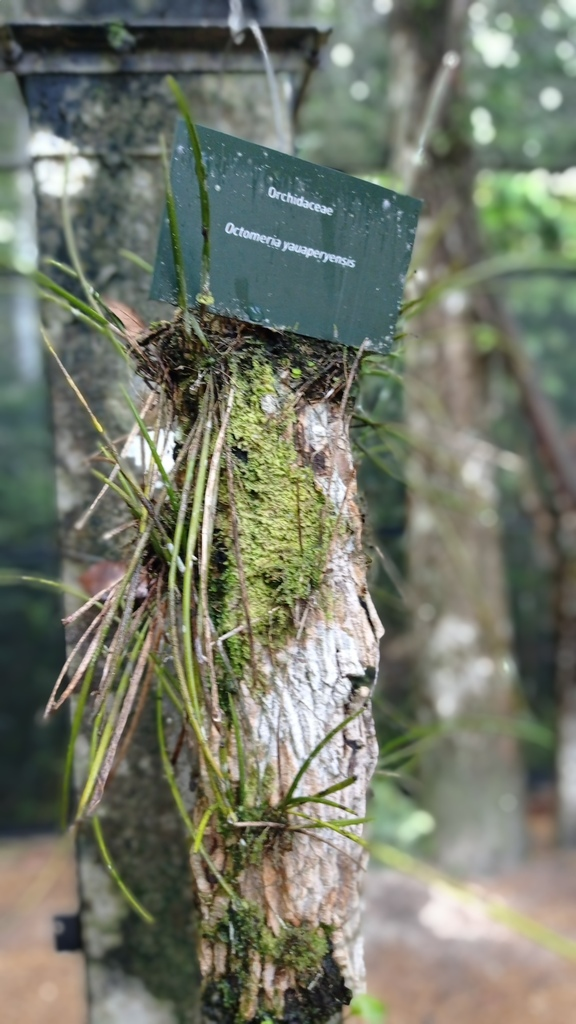

Conservation status
- CITES Appendix II

Scientific classification
- Kingdom: Plantae
- Clade: Tracheophytes
- Clade: Angiosperms
- Clade: Monocots
- Order: Asparagales
- Family: Orchidaceae
- Subfamily: Epidendroideae
- Genus: Octomeria
- Species: O. yauaperyensis

Binomial name
- Octomeria yauaperyensis Barb.Rodr.

Synonyms
- Octomeria complanata C.Schweinf.; Octomeria hondurensis Ames

= Octomeria yauaperyensis =

Species of flowering plant

Octomeria yauaperyensis is a species of flowering plant in the family Orchidaceae. It is an epiphytic herb.

The species is native to Central and South America. It was described in 1891, and is listed in Appendix II of CITES.

== Taxonomy ==
The species was described by 1891, by João Barbosa Rodrigues.

== Distribution ==
Octomeria yauaperyensis is native to the wet tropical biome of Central and South America. It is present in northern Brazil, Costa Rica, Ecuador, Guyana, Honduras, Panamá, Peru, and Venezuela.

It inhabits the Campinarana, Igapó, and Várzea forest ecosystems.

== Conservation ==
Octomeria yauaperyensis is listed in Appendix II of CITES. There are no quotas or suspensions in place for the species.
