= Octomeria napoleon =

Scientific classification
- Kingdom: Plantae
- Clade: Tracheophytes
- Clade: Angiosperms
- Clade: Monocots
- Order: Asparagales
- Family: Orchidaceae
- Subfamily: Epidendroideae
- Genus: Octomeria
- Species: O. napoleon

Binomial name
- Octomeria napoleon Luer ex Gil-Amaya & Karremans

Species of flowering plant

Octomeria napoleon is a species of flowering plant in the family Orchidaceae. It is an epiphyte with leathery leaves and yellow sepals. The species is native to Colombia and Brazil.

Octomeria napoleon was first described in 2010, though the name was not validly published until 2019.

== Taxonomy ==
The name Octomeria napoleon was first used by Carlyle A. Luer in 2010. The name was not validly published, as Luer cited two herbaria when listing a holotype. In 2019, Adam Philip Karremans and Karen Gil-Amaya validated the name.

== Distribution ==
Octomeria napoleon is native to the wet tropical biome of south-east Colombia and northern Brazil (including Amazonas).

== Description ==
Octomeria napoleon is a small but robust epiphyte with slender roots. The stems are 0.5–5 centimetres (0.20–1.97 in) long, and surrounded by two or three tubular sheaths.

The leaves are thickly leathery, elliptical, suffused with purple, 1.5–6 centimetres (0.59–2.36 in) long, and up to 1 centimetre (0.39 in) wide.

The inflorescence has a single flower, which grows on a stem around 1 millimetre (0.039 in) long. The sepals are yellow, elliptical-oblong, around 7 millimetres (0.28 in) long, around 2 millimetres (0.079 in) wide, and have three veins. The petals are elliptical, around 6.5 millimetres (0.26 in) long, and around 1.5 millimetres (0.059 in) wide. The lip is around 3.5 millimetres (0.14 in) long, and around 1.8 millimetres (0.071 in) wide. The lip has three lobes. The column is slender, cylindrical, and around 2 millimetres (0.079 in) long.

== Etymology ==
Luer's original description of the species states that the specific epithet "napoleon" means "lion of the woodland, the powerful, little general".
