= Octomeria chloidophylla =

Conservation status
- CITES Appendix II

Scientific classification
- Kingdom: Plantae
- Clade: Tracheophytes
- Clade: Angiosperms
- Clade: Monocots
- Order: Asparagales
- Family: Orchidaceae
- Subfamily: Epidendroideae
- Genus: Octomeria
- Species: O. chloidophylla

Binomial name
- Octomeria chloidophylla (Rchb.f.) Garay

Synonyms
- Humboltia chloidophylla (Rchb.f.) Kuntze; Pleurothallis chloidophylla Rchb.f.; Octomeria dusenii Schltr.; Octomeria semiconnata C.Schweinf.

Species of flowering plant

Octomeria chloidophylla is a species of flowering plant in the family Orchidaceae. It is an epiphyte native to Brazil, Colombia, Ecuador, and Peru. The species was described in 1850, and is listed in Appendix II of CITES.

== Taxonomy ==
Octomeria chloidophylla was first described in 1850, by Heinrich Gustav Reichenbach, and placed in the genus Pleurothallis. In 1891, Otto Kuntze placed it in the genus Humboltia. In 1967, Leslie Andrew Garay published the new combination Octomeria chloidophylla, and synonymised it with Octomeria dusenii.

== Distribution ==
Octomeria chloidophylla is native to the seasonally dry tropical biome of Brazil (Rio de Janeiro and Santa Catarina), Colombia, Ecuador, and Peru. It grows in tropical rainforests.

== Description ==
Octomeria chloidophylla is an epiphytic herb.

== Conservation ==
Octomeria chloidophylla is listed in Appendix II of CITES. There are no quotas or suspensions in place for the species.
