= Octomeria costaricensis =

Conservation status
- CITES Appendix II

Scientific classification
- Kingdom: Plantae
- Clade: Tracheophytes
- Clade: Angiosperms
- Clade: Monocots
- Order: Asparagales
- Family: Orchidaceae
- Subfamily: Epidendroideae
- Genus: Octomeria
- Species: O. costaricensis

Binomial name
- Octomeria costaricensis Schltr.

Synonyms
- Octomeria valerioi Ames & C.Schweinf.

Species of flowering plant

Octomeria costaricensis is a species of flowering plant in the family Orchidaceae. It is an epiphyte native to Central America. The species was described in 1923, and is listed in Appendix II of CITES.

== Taxonomy ==
The species was described by Rudolf Schlechter in 1923.

== Distribution ==
Octomeria costaricensis is native to the wet tropical biome of Costa Rica, Nicaragua, and Panama.

== Description ==
Octomeria costaricensis is an epiphyte.

== Conservation ==
Octomeria costaricensis is listed in Appendix II of CITES. Wild specimens cannot legally be exported from Panama, subject to exceptions.
