= Octomeria edmundoi =

Conservation status
- CITES Appendix II

Scientific classification
- Kingdom: Plantae
- Clade: Tracheophytes
- Clade: Angiosperms
- Clade: Monocots
- Order: Asparagales
- Family: Orchidaceae
- Subfamily: Epidendroideae
- Genus: Octomeria
- Species: O. edmundoi

Binomial name
- Octomeria edmundoi Brade

Species of flowering plant

Octomeria edmundoi is a species of flowering plant in the family Orchidaceae. It is an epiphyte native to Brazil. The species was described in 1943, and is listed in Appendix II of CITES.

== Taxonomy ==
The species was described by Alexander Curt Brade in 1943.

== Distribution ==
Octomeria edmundoi is native to the seasonally dry tropical biome of Minas Gerais, south-east Brazil.

== Description ==
Octomeria edmundoi is an epiphyte.

== Conservation ==
Octomeria edmundoi is listed in Appendix II of CITES. There are no quotas or suspensions in place for the species.
