= Octomeria ouropretana =

Conservation status
- CITES Appendix II

Scientific classification
- Kingdom: Plantae
- Clade: Tracheophytes
- Clade: Angiosperms
- Clade: Monocots
- Order: Asparagales
- Family: Orchidaceae
- Subfamily: Epidendroideae
- Genus: Octomeria
- Species: O. ouropretana

Binomial name
- Octomeria ouropretana H.Barbosa

Species of flowering plant

Octomeria ouropretana is a species of flowering plant in the family Orchidaceae. It is an epiphyte native to Brazil. The species was described in 1920, and is listed in Appendix II of CITES.

== Taxonomy ==
The species was described by H. Barbosa in 1920.

== Distribution ==
Octomeria ouropretana is native to the wet tropical biome of Minas Gerais, south-east Brazil. It grows in tropical rainforests.

== Description ==
Octomeria ouropretana is an epiphytic herb.

== Conservation ==
Octomeria ouropretana is listed in Appendix II of CITES. There are no quotas or suspensions in place for the species.
