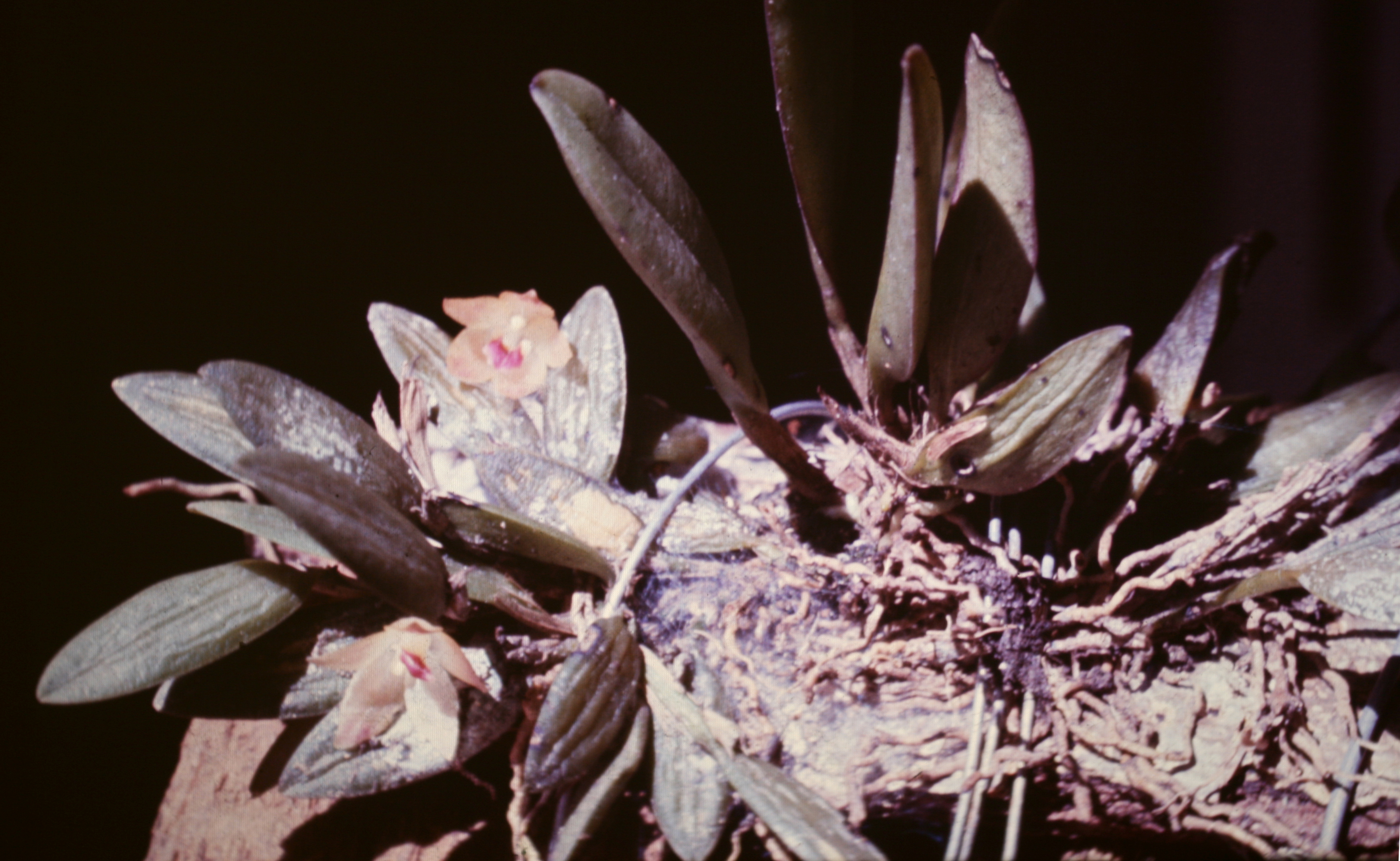

Scientific classification
- Kingdom: Plantae
- Clade: Embryophytes
- Clade: Tracheophytes
- Clade: Angiosperms
- Clade: Monocots
- Order: Asparagales
- Family: Orchidaceae
- Subfamily: Epidendroideae
- Genus: Octomeria
- Species: O. minor

Binomial name
- Octomeria minor C.Schweinf.

= Octomeria minor =

Species of orchid

Octomeria minor is a species of orchid endemic to the Guyanas.
