= Octomeria colombiana =

Conservation status
- CITES Appendix II

Scientific classification
- Kingdom: Plantae
- Clade: Tracheophytes
- Clade: Angiosperms
- Clade: Monocots
- Order: Asparagales
- Family: Orchidaceae
- Subfamily: Epidendroideae
- Genus: Octomeria
- Species: O. colombiana

Binomial name
- Octomeria colombiana Schltr.

Synonyms
- Octomeria amazonica Pabst; Octomeria auriculata Luer & Dalström

Species of flowering plant

Octomeria colombiana is a species of flowering plant in the family Orchidaceae. It is an epiphyte native to South America. The species was described in 1920, and is listed in Appendix II of CITES.

== Taxonomy ==
The species was described by Rudolf Schlechter in 1920.

== Distribution ==
Octomeria colombiana is native to the wet tropical biome of Bolivia, northern Brazil, Colombia, and Ecuador.

== Description ==
Octomeria colombiana is an epiphyte.

== Conservation ==
Octomeria colombiana is listed in Appendix II of CITES. There are no quotas or suspensions in place for the species.
