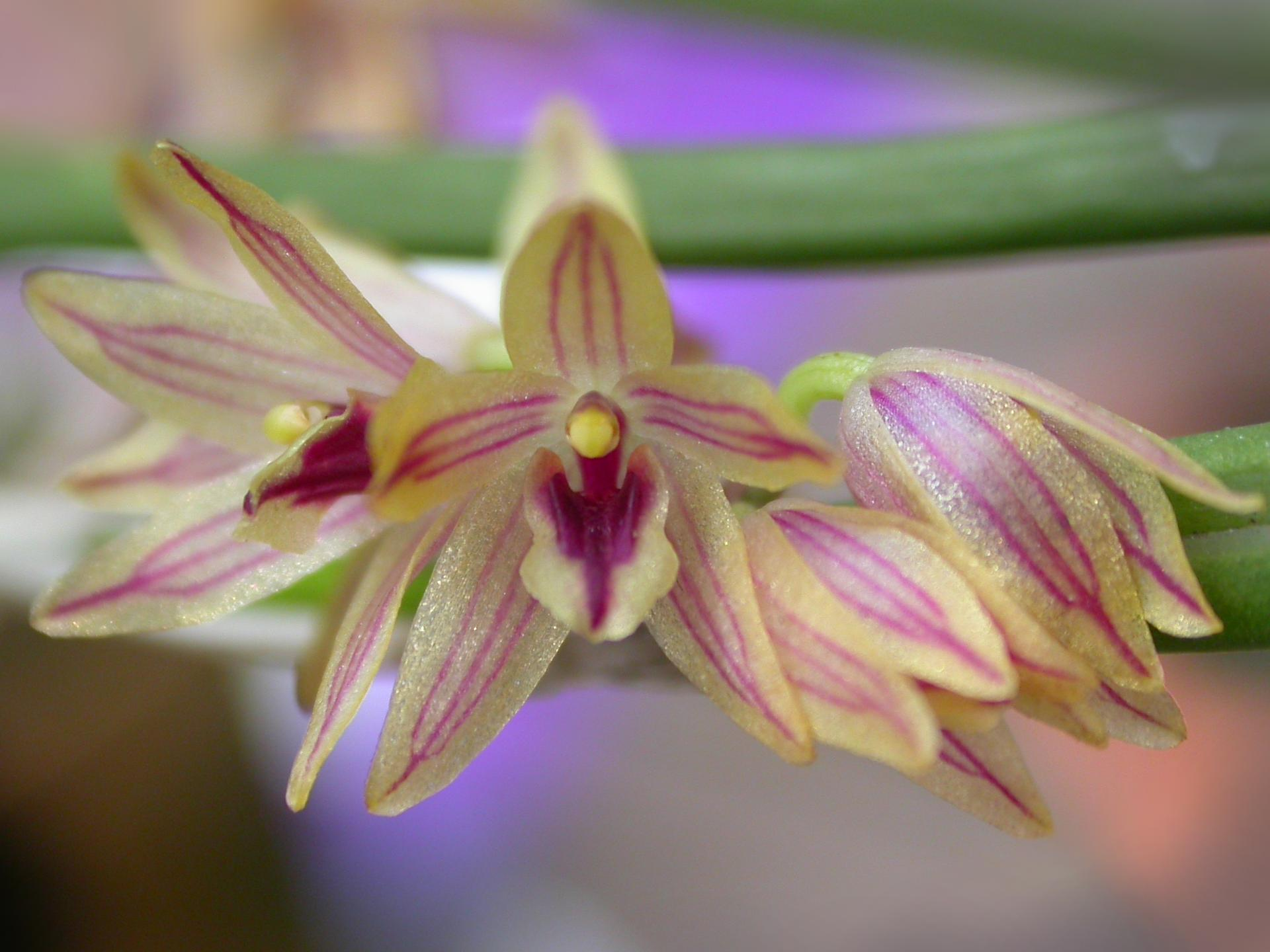

Scientific classification
- Kingdom: Plantae
- Clade: Tracheophytes
- Clade: Angiosperms
- Clade: Monocots
- Order: Asparagales
- Family: Orchidaceae
- Subfamily: Epidendroideae
- Genus: Octomeria
- Species: O. praestans

Binomial name
- Octomeria praestans Barb.Rodr.

Synonyms
- Octomeria paulensis Barb.Rodr.

= Octomeria praestans =

Species of orchid

Octomeria praestans is a species of orchid endemic to southern and southeastern Brazil. The species is placed within the subfamily Epidendroideae and the subtribe Pleurothallidinae. Octomeria praestans was first described by João Barbosa Rodrigues in 1881. Plants of this species are typically found growing in the Atlantic Forest biome, where they can be recognized by their erect growth habit and preference for humid, shaded habitats. The species is considered of interest in horticulture for its distinctive floral characteristics and is recognized as an accepted name by major botanical databases.
