= Octomeria cordilabia =

Conservation status
- CITES Appendix II

Scientific classification
- Kingdom: Plantae
- Clade: Tracheophytes
- Clade: Angiosperms
- Clade: Monocots
- Order: Asparagales
- Family: Orchidaceae
- Subfamily: Epidendroideae
- Genus: Octomeria
- Species: O. cordilabia

Binomial name
- Octomeria cordilabia C.Schweinf.

Species of flowering plant

Octomeria cordilabia is a species of flowering plant in the family Orchidaceae. It is an epiphyte or lithophyte native to Venezuela and Brazil. The species was described in 1961, and is listed in Appendix II of CITES.

== Taxonomy ==
The species was described by Charles Schweinfurth in 1961.

== Distribution ==
Octomeria cordilabia is native to the wet tropical biome of Venezuela and northern Brazil (Amazonas).

== Description ==
Octomeria cordilabia is an epiphytic or lithophytic herb.

== Conservation ==
Octomeria cordilabia is listed in Appendix II of CITES. There are no quotas or suspensions in place for the species.
