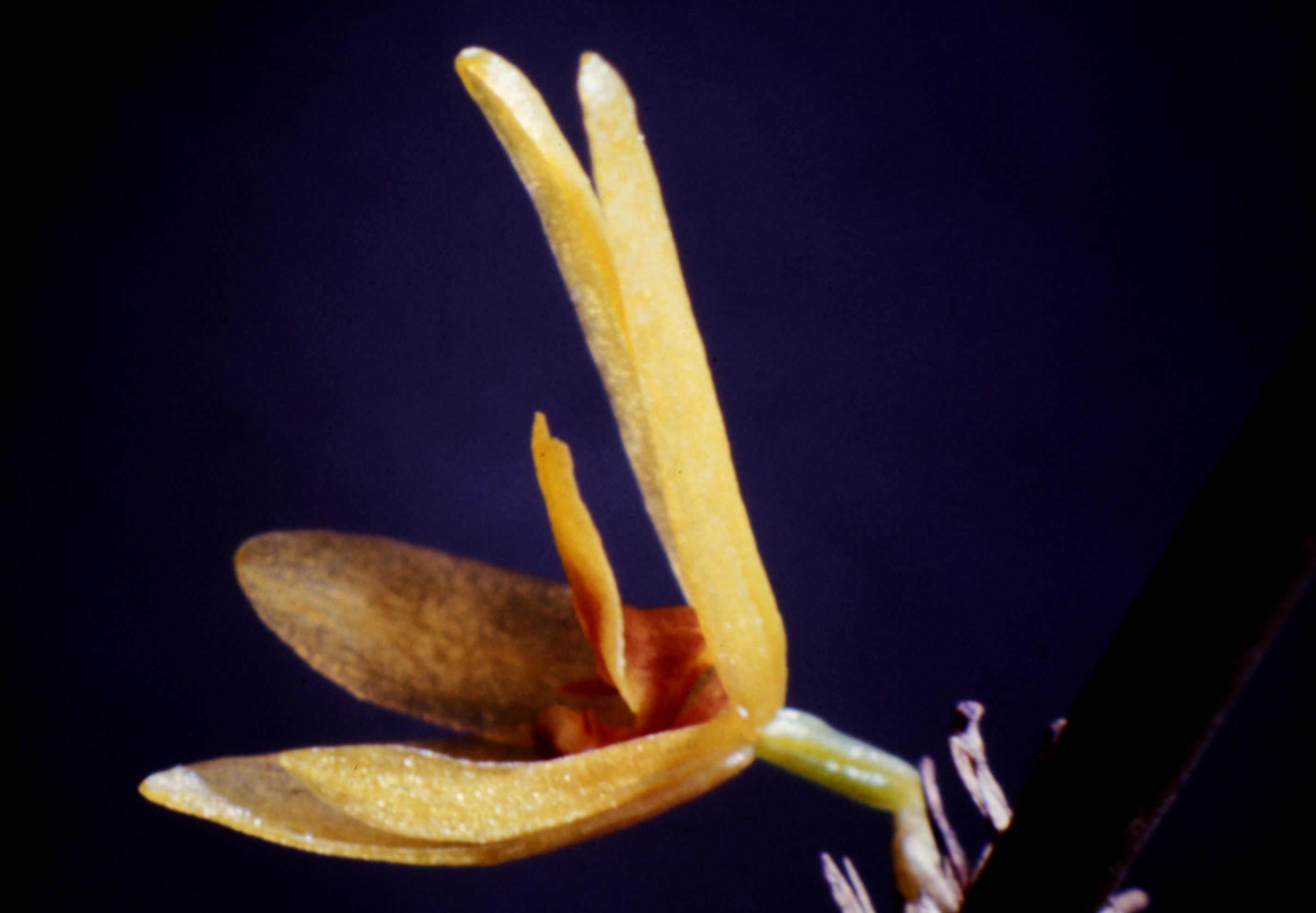
- Octomeria scirpoidea

Scientific classification
- Kingdom: Plantae
- Clade: Tracheophytes
- Clade: Angiosperms
- Clade: Monocots
- Order: Asparagales
- Family: Orchidaceae
- Subfamily: Epidendroideae
- Tribe: Epidendreae
- Subtribe: Pleurothallidinae
- Genus: Octomeria; R.Br.

Synonyms
- Aspegrenia Poepp. & Endl.; Enothrea Raf.; Gigliolia Barb.Rodr., illegitimate; Octandrorchis Brieger, illegitimate

= Octomeria =

Genus of orchids

Octomeria (from Greek "eight part", referring to its 8 pollinia) is a plant genus belonging to the family Orchidaceae. The genus comprises about 150 species native to the Neotropics, mostly in Brazil.

== List of species ==
As of December 2025, Plants of the World Online accepts the following 171 species:

- Octomeria acicularis Luer & R.Vásquez
- Octomeria aetheoantha Barb.Rodr.
- Octomeria albopurpurea Barb.Rodr.
- Octomeria alexandri Schltr.
- Octomeria aloifolia Barb.Rodr.
- Octomeria alpina Barb.Rodr.
- Octomeria anceps Porto & Brade
- Octomeria andreana Campacci & Baptista
- Octomeria anomala Garay & Dunst.
- Octomeria bomboizae Luer
- Octomeria bradei Schltr.
- Octomeria caetensis Pabst
- Octomeria caldensis Hoehne
- Octomeria callosa Luer
- Octomeria campos-portoi Schltr.
- Octomeria candidae Vélez-Abarca, M.M.Jiménez & Baquero
- Octomeria cariocana Pabst
- Octomeria chamaeleptotes Rchb.f.
- Octomeria chloidophylla (Rchb.f.) Garay
- Octomeria cochlearis Rchb.f.
- Octomeria colombiana Schltr.
- Octomeria concolor Barb.Rodr.
- Octomeria condorensis Luer & Hirtz
- Octomeria connellii Rolfe
- Octomeria cordilabia C.Schweinf.
- Octomeria corrigiosa Luer & Toscano
- Octomeria costaricensis Schltr.
- Octomeria crassifolia Lindl.
- Octomeria crassilabia Pabst
- Octomeria cucullata Porto & Brade
- Octomeria dalstroemii Luer
- Octomeria deceptrix Luer
- Octomeria decipiens Dammer
- Octomeria decumbens Cogn.
- Octomeria dentifera C.Schweinf.
- Octomeria diaphana Lindl.
- Octomeria doucetteana L.E.Matthews
- Octomeria edmundoi Brade
- Octomeria ementosa Barb.Rodr.
- Octomeria erosilabia C.Schweinf.
- Octomeria estrellensis Hoehne
- Octomeria exchlorophyllata Barb.Rodr.
- Octomeria exigua C.Schweinf.
- Octomeria fasciculata Barb.Rodr.
- Octomeria ffrenchiana P.Feldmann & N.Barré
- Octomeria fialhoensis Dutra ex Pabst
- Octomeria fibrifera Schltr.
- Octomeria filifolia C.Schweinf.
- Octomeria fimbriata Porto & Peixoto
- Octomeria flabellifera Pabst
- Octomeria flaviflora C.Schweinf.
- Octomeria fusiformis Luer & Toscano
- Octomeria gehrtii Hoehne & Schltr.
- Octomeria gemmula Carnevali & I.Ramírez
- Octomeria georgei Luer
- Octomeria geraensis (Barb.Rodr.) Barb.Rodr.
- Octomeria giordanii T.F.Santos & E.L.F.Menezes
- Octomeria glazioveana Regel
- Octomeria gracilicaulis Schltr.
- Octomeria gracilis Lodd. ex Lindl.
- Octomeria graminifolia (L.) R.Br.
- Octomeria grandiflora Lindl.
- Octomeria guentheriana Kraenzl.
- Octomeria harantiana I.Bock
- Octomeria hatschbachii Schltr.
- Octomeria heleneana Carnevali & F.Delascio
- Octomeria helvola Barb.Rodr.
- Octomeria hexalobata Chiron & N.Sanson
- Octomeria hirtzii Luer
- Octomeria hoehnei Schltr.
- Octomeria iguapensis Schltr.
- Octomeria imigiae T.F.Santos, Toscano & E.C.Smidt
- Octomeria integrilabia C.Schweinf.
- Octomeria irrorata Schltr.
- Octomeria itatiaiae Brade & Pabst
- Octomeria jauaensis Luer
- Octomeria jimenezii Vélez-Abarca
- Octomeria juergensii Schltr.
- Octomeria juncifolia Barb.Rodr.
- Octomeria lamellaris Luer
- Octomeria lancipetala C.Schweinf.
- Octomeria leptophylla Barb.Rodr.
- Octomeria lichenicola Barb.Rodr.
- Octomeria lilliputana W.Forst., F.Barros & V.C.Souza
- Octomeria linearifolia Barb.Rodr.
- Octomeria lithophila (Barb.Rodr.) Barb.Rodr.
- Octomeria longifolia Schltr.
- Octomeria longipedicellata Seehawer
- Octomeria marsupialis Luer
- Octomeria mauritii Pabst & Moutinho
- Octomeria medinae Luer & J.Portilla
- Octomeria micrantha Barb.Rodr.
- Octomeria minor C.Schweinf.
- Octomeria minuta Cogn.
- Octomeria mocoana Schltr.
- Octomeria montana Barb.Rodr.
- Octomeria monticola C.Schweinf.
- Octomeria moscosoae Luer
- Octomeria multiflora Barb.Rodr.
- Octomeria nana C.Schweinf.
- Octomeria napoleon Luer ex Gil-Amaya & Karremans
- Octomeria ochroleuca Barb.Rodr.
- Octomeria octomeriantha (Hoehne) Pabst
- Octomeria odontoglossoides Luer
- Octomeria oncidioides Luer
- Octomeria ouropretana H.Barbosa
- Octomeria oxychela Barb.Rodr.
- Octomeria pacii Vélez-Abarca, M.M.Jiménez & Baquero
- Octomeria palmyrabellae Barb.Rodr.
- Octomeria panguiensis Vélez-Abarca, M.M.Jiménez & Baquero
- Octomeria parvifolia Rolfe
- Octomeria parvula C.Schweinf.
- Octomeria peruviana D.E.Benn. & Christenson
- Octomeria pinicola Barb.Rodr.
- Octomeria platytylis W.Forst., F.Barros & V.C.Souza
- Octomeria portillae Luer & Hirtz
- Octomeria praestans Barb.Rodr.
- Octomeria prostrata H.Stenzel
- Octomeria pumila Seehawer
- Octomeria purpurascens Sambin & Chiron
- Octomeria pusilla Lindl.
- Octomeria pygmaea C.Schweinf.
- Octomeria recchiana Hoehne
- Octomeria reitzii Pabst
- Octomeria rhizomatosa C.Schweinf.
- Octomeria rhodoglossa Schltr.
- Octomeria rigida Barb.Rodr.
- Octomeria riograndensis Schltr.
- Octomeria rodeiensis Barb.Rodr.
- Octomeria rodriguesii Cogn.
- Octomeria rohrii Pabst
- Octomeria romerorum Carnevali & I.Ramírez
- Octomeria rotundata Luer & Hirtz
- Octomeria rotundiglossa Hoehne
- Octomeria rubrifolia Barb.Rodr.
- Octomeria sagittata (Rchb.f.) Garay
- Octomeria sancti-angeli Kraenzl.
- Octomeria sansoniana Chiron & Guiard
- Octomeria sarcophylla Barb.Rodr.
- Octomeria sarthouae Luer
- Octomeria saundersiana Rchb.f.
- Octomeria schultesii Pabst
- Octomeria scirpoidea (Poepp. & Endl.) Rchb.f.
- Octomeria serrana Hoehne
- Octomeria setigera Pabst
- Octomeria spannagelii Hoehne
- Octomeria spatulata Rchb.f.
- Octomeria splendida Garay & Dunst.
- Octomeria stellaris Barb.Rodr.
- Octomeria steyermarkii Garay & Dunst.
- Octomeria subcallosa W.Forst., F.Barros & V.C.Souza
- Octomeria sulfurea Chiron & N.Sanson
- Octomeria surinamensis H.Focke
- Octomeria tapiricataractae G.A.Romero & Luer
- Octomeria taracuana Schltr.
- Octomeria tellina W.Forst., F.Barros & V.C.Souza
- Octomeria tricolor Rchb.f.
- Octomeria tridentata Lindl.
- Octomeria truncicola Barb.Rodr.
- Octomeria tweediei Luer & Toscano
- Octomeria uberiformis Sambin & Chiron
- Octomeria umbonulata Schltr.
- Octomeria unguiculata Schltr.
- Octomeria ventii H.Dietr.
- Octomeria warmingii Rchb.f.
- Octomeria wawrae Rchb.f. ex Wawra
- Octomeria werneri Luer & Thoerle
- Octomeria wilsoniana Hoehne
- Octomeria ximenae Luer & Hirtz
- Octomeria yauaperyensis Barb.Rodr.
- Octomeria zygoglossa Luer
