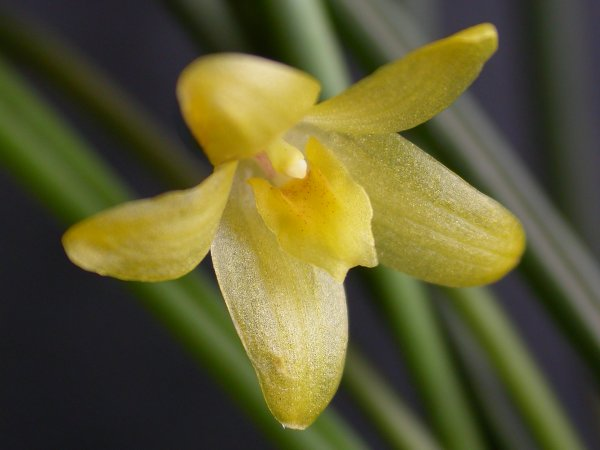

Scientific classification
- Kingdom: Plantae
- Clade: Tracheophytes
- Clade: Angiosperms
- Clade: Monocots
- Order: Asparagales
- Family: Orchidaceae
- Subfamily: Epidendroideae
- Genus: Octomeria
- Species: O. juncifolia

Binomial name
- Octomeria juncifolia Barb.Rodr.

Synonyms
- Octomeria juncifolia var. revoluta Barb.Rodr.; Octomeria juncifolia var. minor Cogn.

= Octomeria juncifolia =

Species of orchid

Octomeria juncifolia is a species of orchid endemic to southern and southeastern Brazil.
