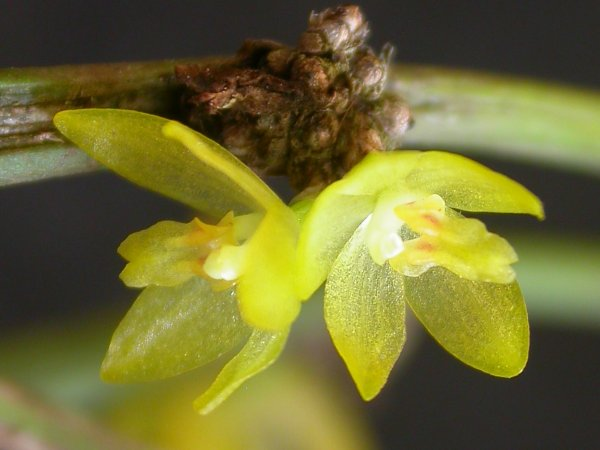

Scientific classification
- Kingdom: Plantae
- Clade: Tracheophytes
- Clade: Angiosperms
- Clade: Monocots
- Order: Asparagales
- Family: Orchidaceae
- Subfamily: Epidendroideae
- Genus: Octomeria
- Species: O. rodeiensis

Binomial name
- Octomeria rodeiensis Barb.Rodr.

= Octomeria rodeiensis =

Species of orchid

Octomeria rodeiensis is a species of orchid endemic to southeastern Brazil and Ecuador.
