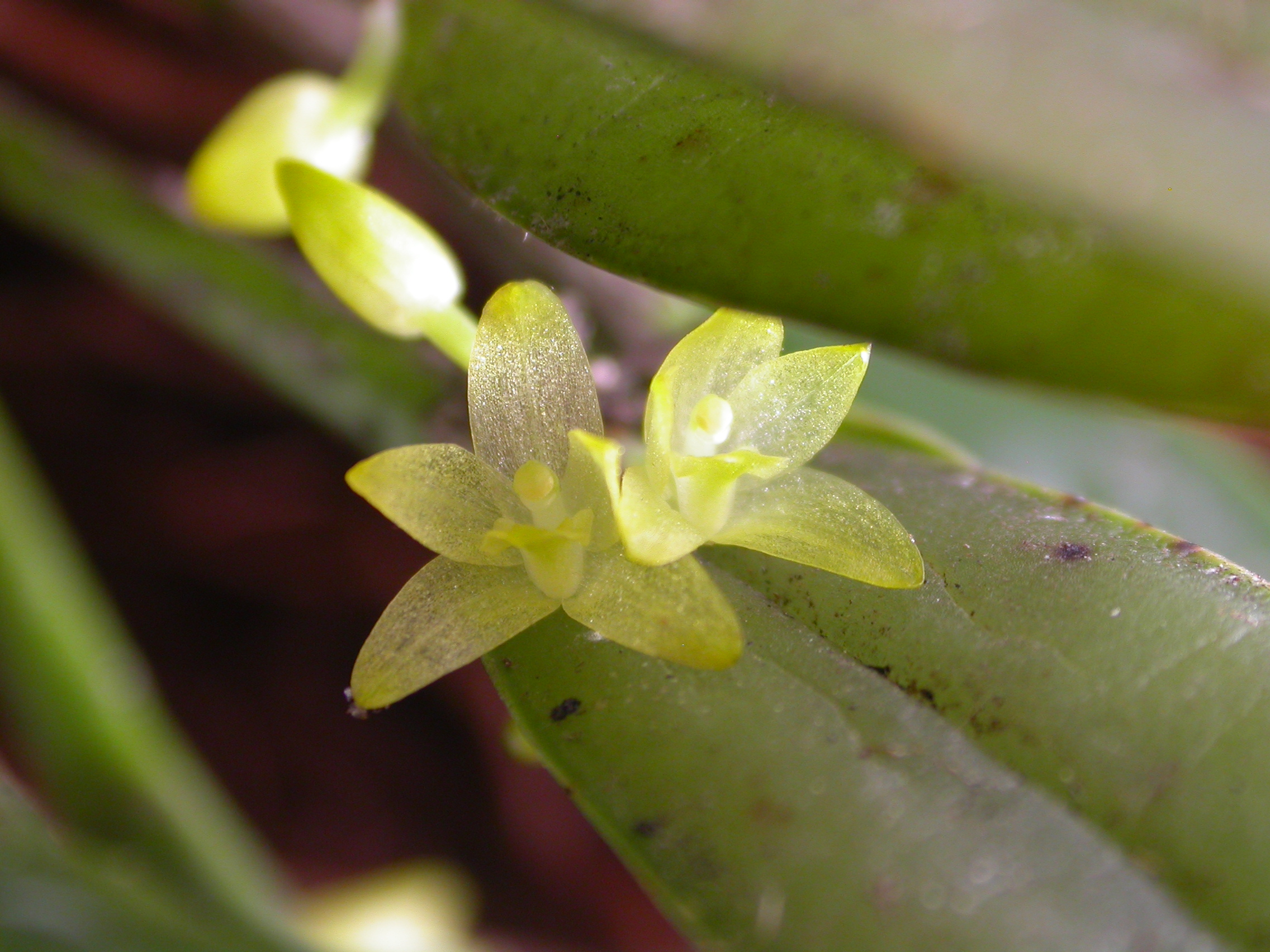

Scientific classification
- Kingdom: Plantae
- Clade: Tracheophytes
- Clade: Angiosperms
- Clade: Monocots
- Order: Asparagales
- Family: Orchidaceae
- Subfamily: Epidendroideae
- Genus: Octomeria
- Species: O. ementosa

Binomial name
- Octomeria ementosa Barb.Rodr.

= Octomeria ementosa =

Species of orchid

Octomeria ementosa is a species of orchid endemic to Brazil (Rio de Janeiro, Paraná). This species name was first identified by João Barbosa Rodrigues in 1882.
