= Octomeria diaphana =

Conservation status
- CITES Appendix II

Scientific classification
- Kingdom: Plantae
- Clade: Tracheophytes
- Clade: Angiosperms
- Clade: Monocots
- Order: Asparagales
- Family: Orchidaceae
- Subfamily: Epidendroideae
- Genus: Octomeria
- Species: O. diaphana

Binomial name
- Octomeria diaphana Lindl.

Species of flowering plant

Octomeria diaphana is a species of flowering plant in the family Orchidaceae. It is an epiphyte native to Bolivia and Brazil. The species was described in 1839, and is listed in Appendix II of CITES.

== Taxonomy ==
The species was described by John Lindley in 1839.

== Distribution ==
Octomeria diaphana is native to the wet tropical biome of Brazil (south and south-east) and eastern Bolivia.

== Description ==
Octomeria diaphana is an epiphyte.

== Conservation ==
Octomeria diaphana is listed in Appendix II of CITES. There are no quotas or suspensions in place for the species.
