= Octomeria werneri =

Conservation status
- CITES Appendix II

Scientific classification
- Kingdom: Plantae
- Clade: Embryophytes
- Clade: Tracheophytes
- Clade: Spermatophytes
- Clade: Angiosperms
- Clade: Monocots
- Order: Asparagales
- Family: Orchidaceae
- Subfamily: Epidendroideae
- Genus: Octomeria
- Species: O. werneri

Binomial name
- Octomeria werneri Luer & Thoerle

Species of flowering plant

Octomeria werneri is a species of flowering plant in the family Orchidaceae. It is a small, epiphytic orchid with elliptical leaves, self-pollinating flowers, and light-rose coloured sepals.

The species is native to Ecuador. It was described in 2011, and is listed in Appendix II of CITES.

== Taxonomy ==
The species was named by Carlyle A. Luer and Lisa Terri Thoerle in 2011. The type material was collected from Zamora-Chinchipe Province, Ecuador, in 2008, at an elevation of 2,400 metres (7,900 ft). The species is known only from the original collection.

== Distribution ==
Octomeria werneri is native to the wet tropical biome of Zamora-Chinchipe, Ecuador.

== Description ==
Octomeria werneri is a small epiphytic orchid, with coarse roots. The stem is stout, 3.5 centimetres (1.4 in) tall, and surrounded by three to four loose sheaths. The sheathes eventually disintegrate. The leaves are elliptical, leathery, around 5–6 centimetres (2.0–2.4 in) long, and around 1 centimetre (0.39 in) wide.

The flowers are single, self-pollinating, and grow on 2–3 millimetres (0.079–0.118 in) stems. The sepals are light rose in colour. The dorsal sepal is around 10 millimetres (0.39 in) long, and 3.5 millimetres (0.14 in) wide. The lateral sepals are around 9 millimetres (0.35 in) long, and 3 millimetres (0.12 in) wide.

The petals are membranous and ovate. They are 9.5 millimetres (0.37 in) long, and 3 millimetres (0.12 in) wide. The lip is 8 millimetres (0.31 in) long, 4 millimetres (0.16 in) wide, and has three lobes.

The ovary is 5 millimetres (0.20 in) long. The column is semicircular in cross-section, and 2.5 millimetres (0.098 in) long.

== Conservation ==
Octomeria werneri is listed in Appendix II of CITES. There are no quotas or suspensions in place for the species.

== Etymology ==
Octomeria werneri is named after Florian Werner, who collected the species.
