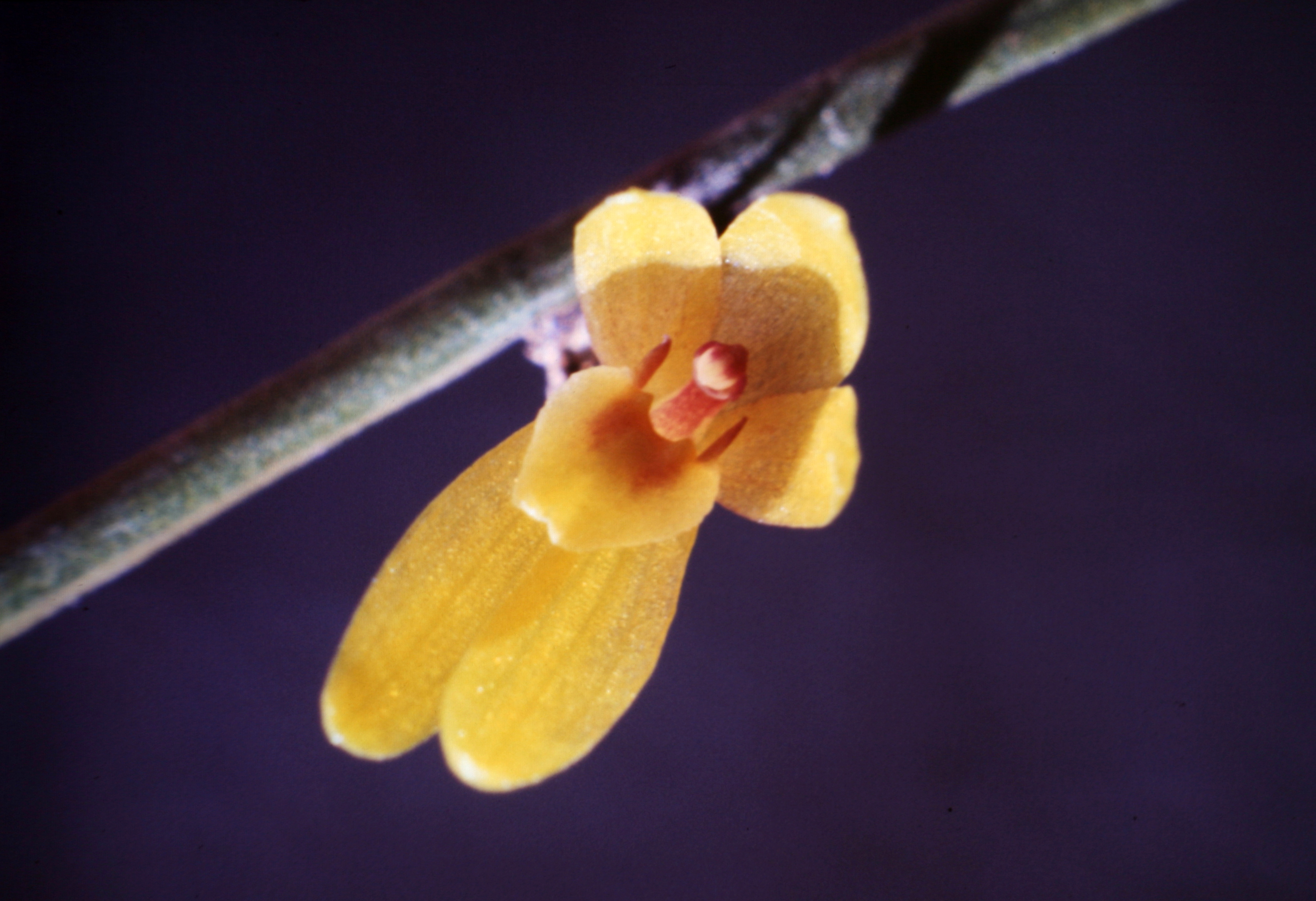

Scientific classification
- Kingdom: Plantae
- Clade: Tracheophytes
- Clade: Angiosperms
- Clade: Monocots
- Order: Asparagales
- Family: Orchidaceae
- Subfamily: Epidendroideae
- Genus: Octomeria
- Species: O. scirpoidea

Binomial name
- Octomeria scirpoidea (Poepp. & Endl.) Rchb.f.

Synonyms'
- Aspegrenia scirpoidea Poepp. & Endl; Octomeria brachypetala Schltr.; Octomeria brevifolia Cogn.; Octomeria scirpifolia Hoffmanns.; Octomeria tenuis Schltr.

= Octomeria scirpoidea =

Species of orchid

Octomeria scirpoidea is a species of orchid endemic to South America (Bolivia, northern Brazil, Colombia, Ecuador, French Guiana, Guyana, Panama, Peru, Suriname, Venezuela).
