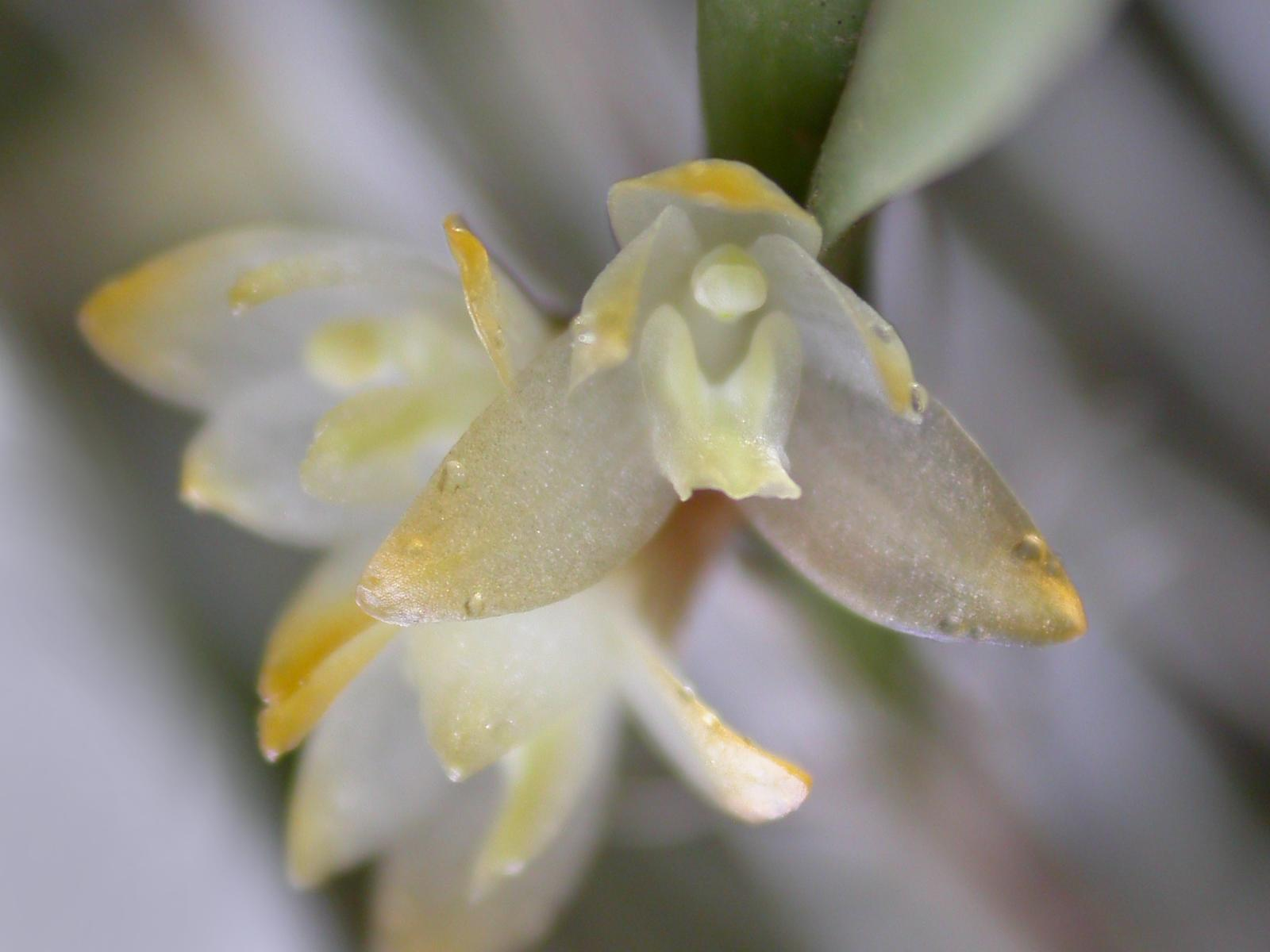

Scientific classification
- Kingdom: Plantae
- Clade: Tracheophytes
- Clade: Angiosperms
- Clade: Monocots
- Order: Asparagales
- Family: Orchidaceae
- Subfamily: Epidendroideae
- Genus: Octomeria
- Species: O. pinicola

Binomial name
- Octomeria pinicola Barb.Rodr.

= Octomeria pinicola =

Species of orchid

Octomeria pinicola is a species of orchid found from Brazil to Argentina (Misiones).
