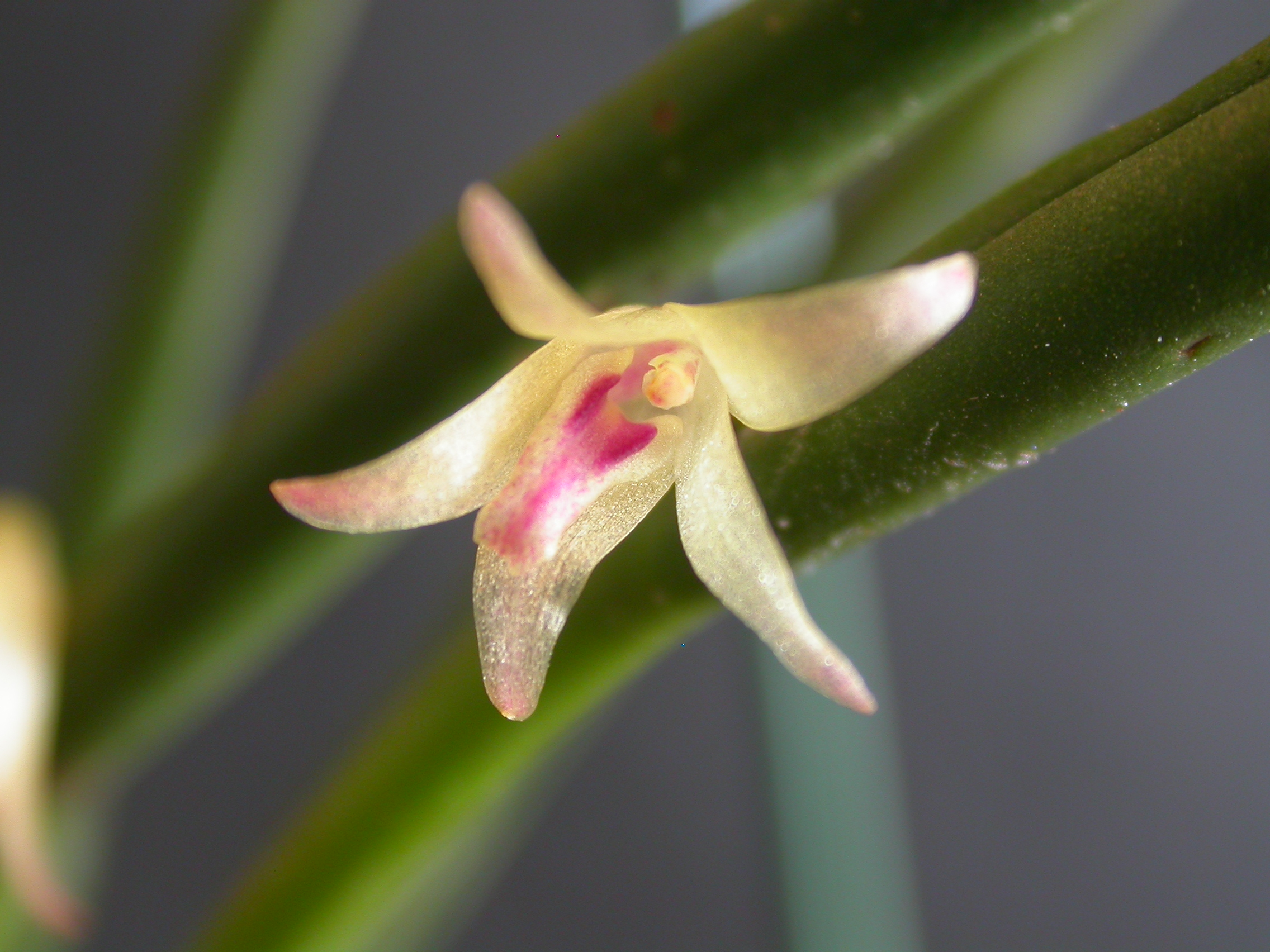

Scientific classification
- Kingdom: Plantae
- Clade: Tracheophytes
- Clade: Angiosperms
- Clade: Monocots
- Order: Asparagales
- Family: Orchidaceae
- Subfamily: Epidendroideae
- Genus: Octomeria
- Species: O. truncicola

Binomial name
- Octomeria truncicola Barb.Rodr.

= Octomeria truncicola =

Species of orchid

Octomeria truncicola is a species of orchid endemic to Brazil (Rio de Janeiro).
