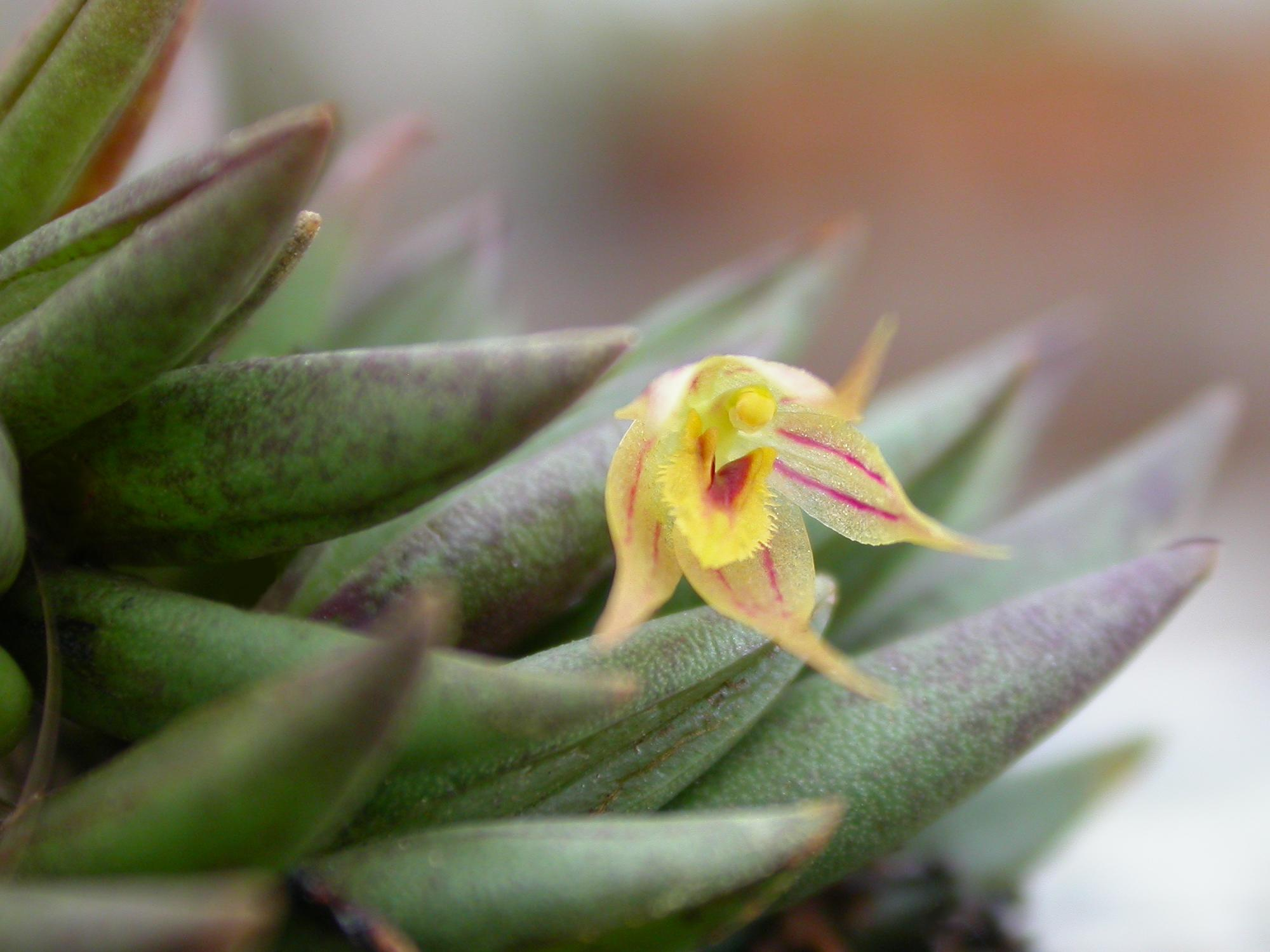

Scientific classification
- Kingdom: Plantae
- Clade: Tracheophytes
- Clade: Angiosperms
- Clade: Monocots
- Order: Asparagales
- Family: Orchidaceae
- Subfamily: Epidendroideae
- Genus: Octomeria
- Species: O. aloifolia

Binomial name
- Octomeria aloifolia Barb.Rodr.

= Octomeria aloifolia =

Species of orchid

Octomeria aloifolia is a species of orchid native to eastern Brazil.
