= Octomeria decipiens =

Conservation status
- CITES Appendix II

Scientific classification
- Kingdom: Plantae
- Clade: Tracheophytes
- Clade: Angiosperms
- Clade: Monocots
- Order: Asparagales
- Family: Orchidaceae
- Subfamily: Epidendroideae
- Genus: Octomeria
- Species: O. decipiens

Binomial name
- Octomeria decipiens Dammer

Species of flowering plant

Octomeria decipiens is a species of flowering plant in the family Orchidaceae. It is an epiphyte likely to be native to Brazil. The species was described in 1910, and is listed in Appendix II of CITES.

== Taxonomy ==
The species was described by Carl Lebrecht Udo Dammer in 1910.

== Distribution ==
Octomeria decipiens is likely to be native to the seasonally dry tropical biome of Brazil.

== Description ==
Octomeria decipiens is an epiphyte.

== Conservation ==
Octomeria decipiens is listed in Appendix II of CITES. There are no quotas or suspensions in place for the species.
