= Octomeria corrigiosa =

Conservation status
- CITES Appendix II

Scientific classification
- Kingdom: Plantae
- Clade: Tracheophytes
- Clade: Angiosperms
- Clade: Monocots
- Order: Asparagales
- Family: Orchidaceae
- Subfamily: Epidendroideae
- Genus: Octomeria
- Species: O. corrigiosa

Binomial name
- Octomeria corrigiosa Luer & Toscano

Species of flowering plant

Octomeria corrigiosa is a species of flowering plant in the family Orchidaceae. It is an epiphyte native to Brazil. The species was described in 2010, and is listed in Appendix II of CITES.

== Taxonomy ==
The species was described by Carlyle A. Luer and Antonio Luiz Vieira Toscano in 2010.

== Distribution ==
Octomeria corrigiosa is native to the wet tropical biome of Minas Gerais, south-east Brazil.

== Description ==
Octomeria corrigiosa is an epiphyte.

== Conservation ==
Octomeria corrigiosa is listed in Appendix II of CITES. There are no quotas or suspensions in place for the species.
