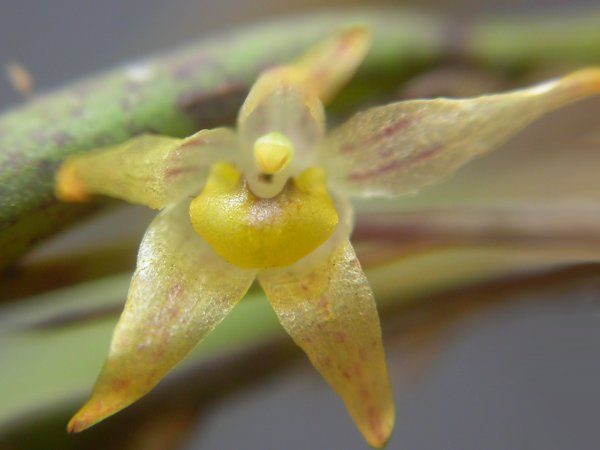

Scientific classification
- Kingdom: Plantae
- Clade: Tracheophytes
- Clade: Angiosperms
- Clade: Monocots
- Order: Asparagales
- Family: Orchidaceae
- Subfamily: Epidendroideae
- Genus: Octomeria
- Species: O. cucullata

Binomial name
- Octomeria cucullata Porto & Brade

= Octomeria cucullata =

Species of orchid

Octomeria cucullata is a species of orchid that is native to Brazil, specifically the states of Rio de Janeiro and Paraná.
