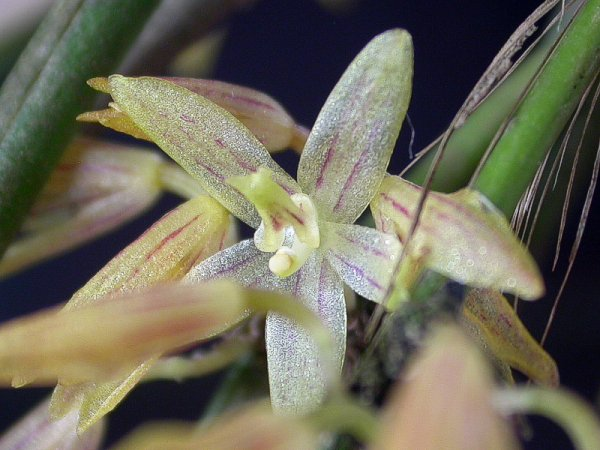

Scientific classification
- Kingdom: Plantae
- Clade: Tracheophytes
- Clade: Angiosperms
- Clade: Monocots
- Order: Asparagales
- Family: Orchidaceae
- Subfamily: Epidendroideae
- Genus: Octomeria
- Species: O. palmyrabellae

Binomial name
- Octomeria palmyrabellae Barb.Rodr.

= Octomeria palmyrabellae =

Species of orchid

Octomeria palmyrabellae is a species of orchid endemic to Brazil (São Paulo to Paraná). It is a cespitose epiphyte that ranges from 113 - 302mm long with cylindrical to sub-cylindrical leaves. The flowers are yellowish with wine-colored streaks, and come borne in a dense fascicle. Its habitat in Paraná is in the thickets of Araucaria moist forests, where it flowers from September to May.
