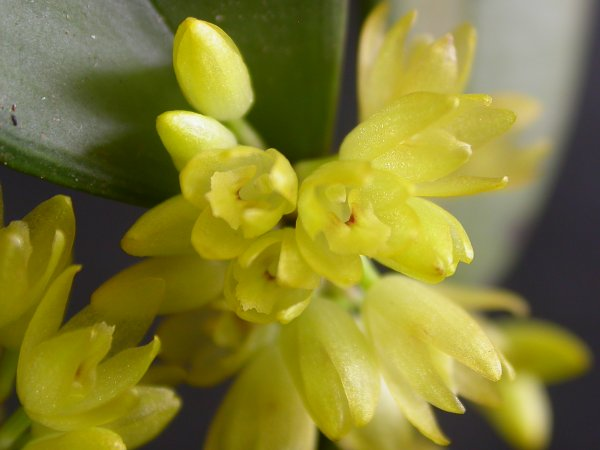

Scientific classification
- Kingdom: Plantae
- Clade: Tracheophytes
- Clade: Angiosperms
- Clade: Monocots
- Order: Asparagales
- Family: Orchidaceae
- Subfamily: Epidendroideae
- Genus: Octomeria
- Species: O. concolor

Binomial name
- Octomeria concolor Barb.Rodr.

= Octomeria concolor =

Species of orchid

Octomeria concolor is a species of orchid native to Bolivia and Brazil.
