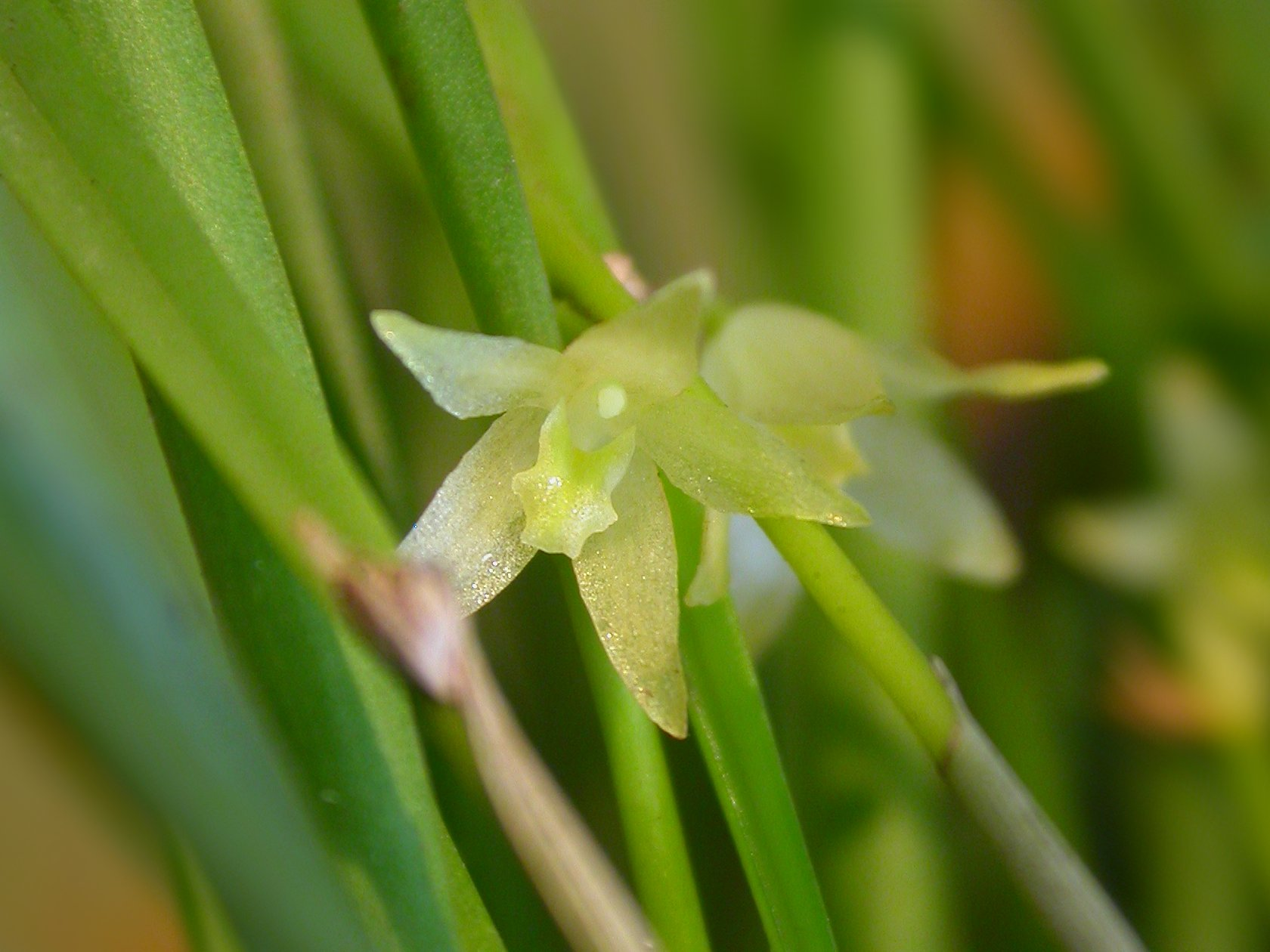

Scientific classification
- Kingdom: Plantae
- Clade: Tracheophytes
- Clade: Angiosperms
- Clade: Monocots
- Order: Asparagales
- Family: Orchidaceae
- Subfamily: Epidendroideae
- Genus: Octomeria
- Species: O. linearifolia

Binomial name
- Octomeria linearifolia Barb.Rodr.

= Octomeria linearifolia =

Species of orchid

Octomeria linearifolia is a species of orchid endemic to Brazil (Pernambuco to Paraná).
