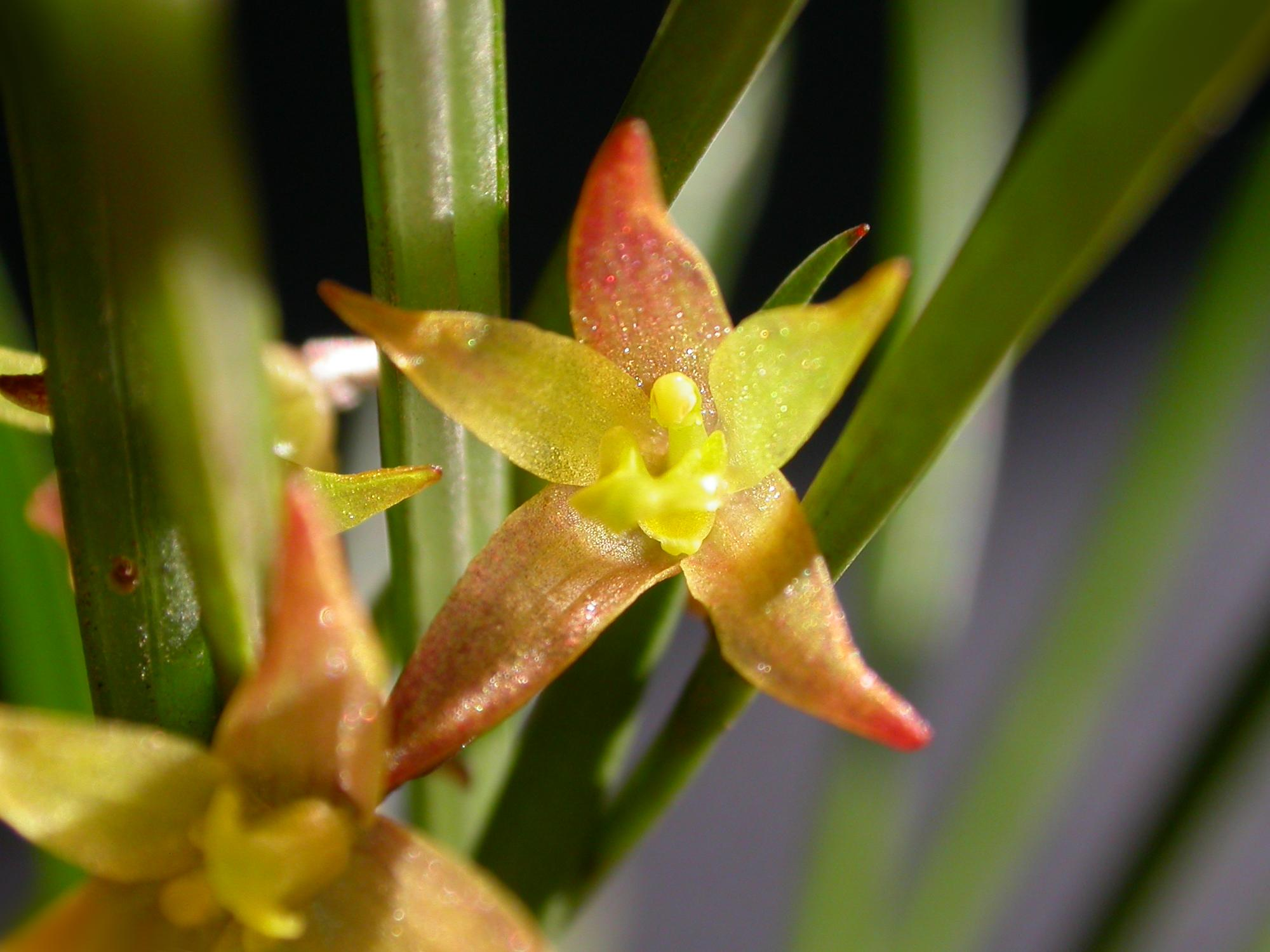

Scientific classification
- Kingdom: Plantae
- Clade: Tracheophytes
- Clade: Angiosperms
- Clade: Monocots
- Order: Asparagales
- Family: Orchidaceae
- Subfamily: Epidendroideae
- Genus: Octomeria
- Species: O. chamaeleptotes

Binomial name
- Octomeria chamaeleptotes Rchb.f.

= Octomeria chamaeleptotes =

Species of orchid

Octomeria chamaeleptotes is a species of orchid occurring from Brazil to Argentina (Misiones).
