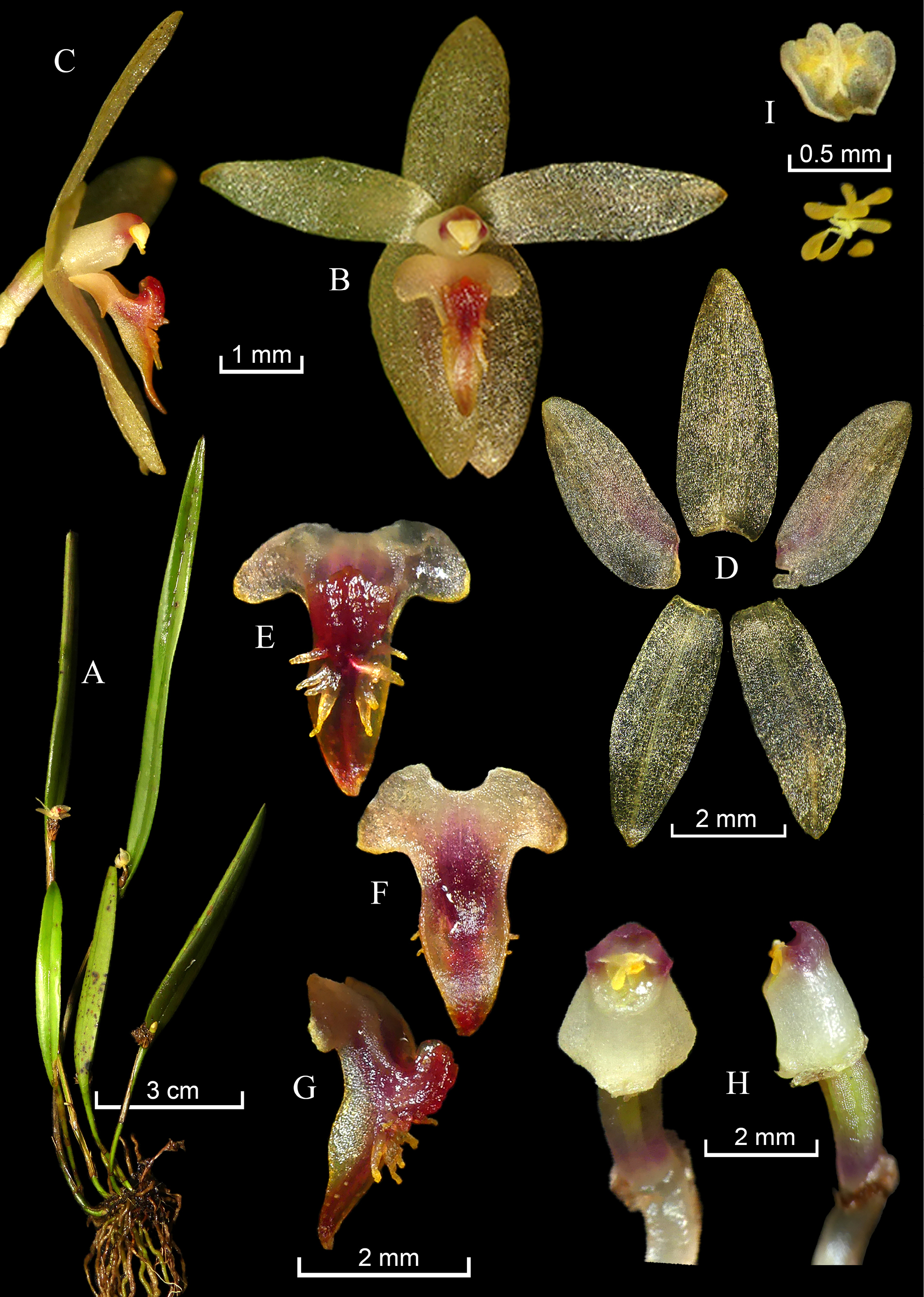

Conservation status
- CITES Appendix II

Scientific classification
- Kingdom: Plantae
- Clade: Tracheophytes
- Clade: Angiosperms
- Clade: Monocots
- Order: Asparagales
- Family: Orchidaceae
- Subfamily: Epidendroideae
- Genus: Octomeria
- Species: O. oncidioides

Binomial name
- Octomeria oncidioides Luer

= Octomeria oncidioides =

Species of flowering plant

Octomeria oncidioides is a species of flowering plant in the family Orchidaceae. It is an epiphyte native to Bolivia and Ecuador. The species was described in 2003, and is listed in Appendix II of CITES.

== Taxonomy ==
The species was described by Carlyle A. Luer in 2003. The type specimen was collected near Tipuani, Bolivia, at an elevation of 1,200 metres (3,900 ft). The type locality is in premontane forest in north-west Bolivia.

== Distribution ==
Octomeria oncidioides is native to the wet tropical biome of Bolivia. In April 2026, it was reported in south-eastern Ecuador (Morona-Santiago Province and Zamora-Chinchipe Province). The species is also likely to occur in the Peruvian Andes.

== Description ==
Octomeria oncidioides is an epiphyte. It has been observed growing on Alchornea grandis and Ficus.

== Conservation ==
Octomeria oncidioides is listed in Appendix II of CITES. There are no quotas or suspensions in place for the species.
