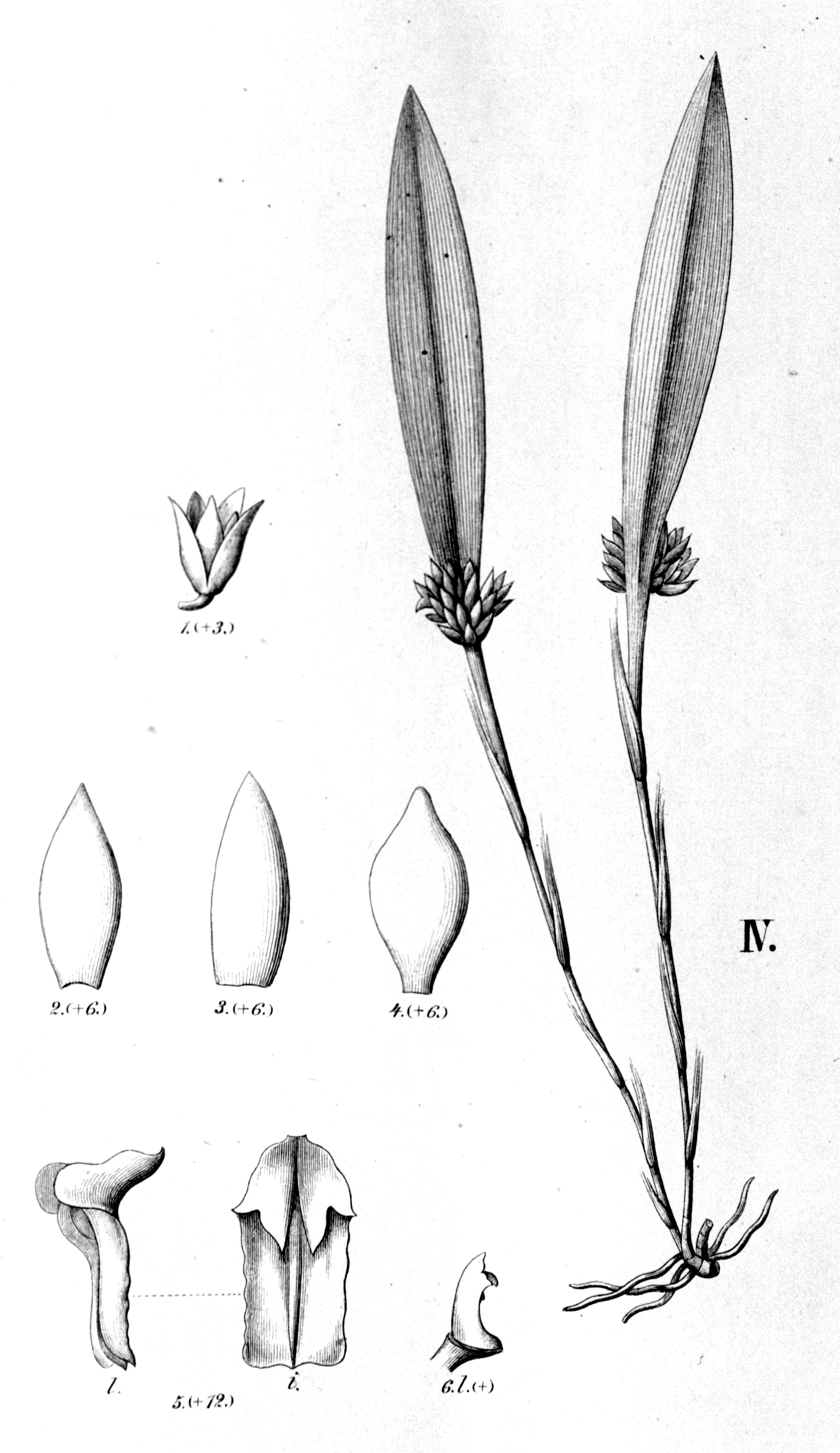
- Illustration

Conservation status
- CITES Appendix II

Scientific classification
- Kingdom: Plantae
- Clade: Embryophytes
- Clade: Tracheophytes
- Clade: Spermatophytes
- Clade: Angiosperms
- Clade: Monocots
- Order: Asparagales
- Family: Orchidaceae
- Subfamily: Epidendroideae
- Genus: Octomeria
- Species: O. oxychela

Binomial name
- Octomeria oxychela Barb.Rodr.

Synonyms
- Octomeria oxychela var. gracilis Cogn.

= Octomeria oxychela =

Species of flowering plant

Octomeria oxychela is a species of flowering plant in the family Orchidaceae. It is an epiphyte native to Brazil and Guyana. The species was described in 1881, and is listed in Appendix II of CITES.

== Taxonomy ==
Octomeria oxychela was described by João Barbosa Rodrigues in 1881.

== Distribution ==
The species is native to the wet tropical biome of Brazil (northeast, south, and southeast) and Guyana.

== Conservation ==
Octomeria oxychela is listed in Appendix II of CITES. There are no quotas or suspensions in place for the species.
