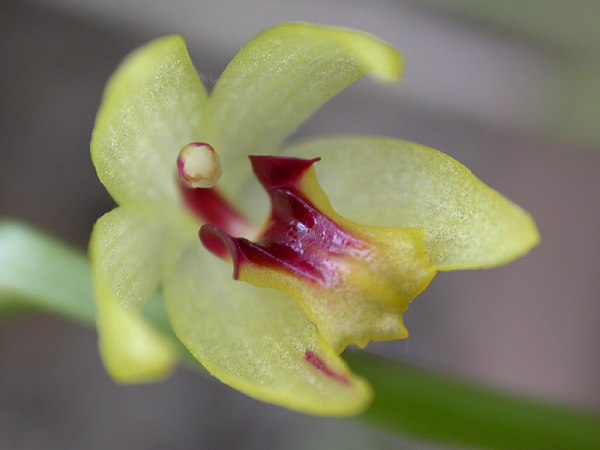

Scientific classification
- Kingdom: Plantae
- Clade: Tracheophytes
- Clade: Angiosperms
- Clade: Monocots
- Order: Asparagales
- Family: Orchidaceae
- Subfamily: Epidendroideae
- Genus: Octomeria
- Species: O. grandiflora

Binomial name
- Octomeria grandiflora Lindl.

Synonyms
- Octomeria surinamensis H.Focke; Octomeria robusta Barb.Rodr.; Octomeria robusta Rchb.f. & Warm.; Octomeria seegeriana Kraenzl.; Octomeria grandiflora var. robusta (Barb.Rodr.) Cogn.; Octomeria grandiflora var. seegeriana (Kraenzl.) Cogn.; Octomeria boliviensis Rolfe; Octomeria similis Schltr.; Octomeria ruthiana Hoehne

= Octomeria grandiflora =

Species of orchid

Octomeria grandiflora is a species of orchid endemic to Brazil (São Paulo to Paraná). It is pollinated by flies in the family Sciaridae, and has strong self-incompatibility.
