= Octomeria dalstroemii =

Conservation status
- CITES Appendix II

Scientific classification
- Kingdom: Plantae
- Clade: Tracheophytes
- Clade: Angiosperms
- Clade: Monocots
- Order: Asparagales
- Family: Orchidaceae
- Subfamily: Epidendroideae
- Genus: Octomeria
- Species: O. dalstroemii

Binomial name
- Octomeria dalstroemii Luer

Species of flowering plant

Octomeria dalstroemii is a species of flowering plant in the family Orchidaceae. It is an epiphyte native to Ecuador. The species was described in 2001, and is listed in Appendix II of CITES.

== Taxonomy ==
The species was described by Carlyle A. Luer in 2001.

== Distribution ==
Octomeria dalstroemii is native to the wet tropical biome of Ecuador.

== Description ==
Octomeria dalstroemii is an epiphyte.

== Conservation ==
Octomeria dalstroemii is listed in Appendix II of CITES. There are no quotas or suspenions in place for the species.

== Etymology ==
The specific epithet dalstroemii honours Stig Dalström.
