= Octomeria dentifera =

Conservation status
- CITES Appendix II

Scientific classification
- Kingdom: Plantae
- Clade: Tracheophytes
- Clade: Angiosperms
- Clade: Monocots
- Order: Asparagales
- Family: Orchidaceae
- Subfamily: Epidendroideae
- Genus: Octomeria
- Species: O. dentifera

Binomial name
- Octomeria dentifera C.Schweinf.

Species of flowering plant

Octomeria dentifera is a species of flowering plant in the family Orchidaceae. It is a lithophyte native to Venezuela. The species was described in 1961, and is listed in Appendix II of CITES.

== Taxonomy ==
The species was described by Charles Schweinfurth in 1961.

== Distribution ==
Octomeria dentifera is native to the wet tropical biome of Bolívar, Venezuela.

== Description ==
Octomeria dentifera is a lithophyte. It is similar to Octomeria parvula, though Octomeria dentifera is larger.

== Conservation ==
Octomeria dentifera is listed in Appendix II of CITES. There are no quotas or suspensions in place for the species.

== Etymology ==
The specific epithet dentifera refers to the toothed edges of the lip.
