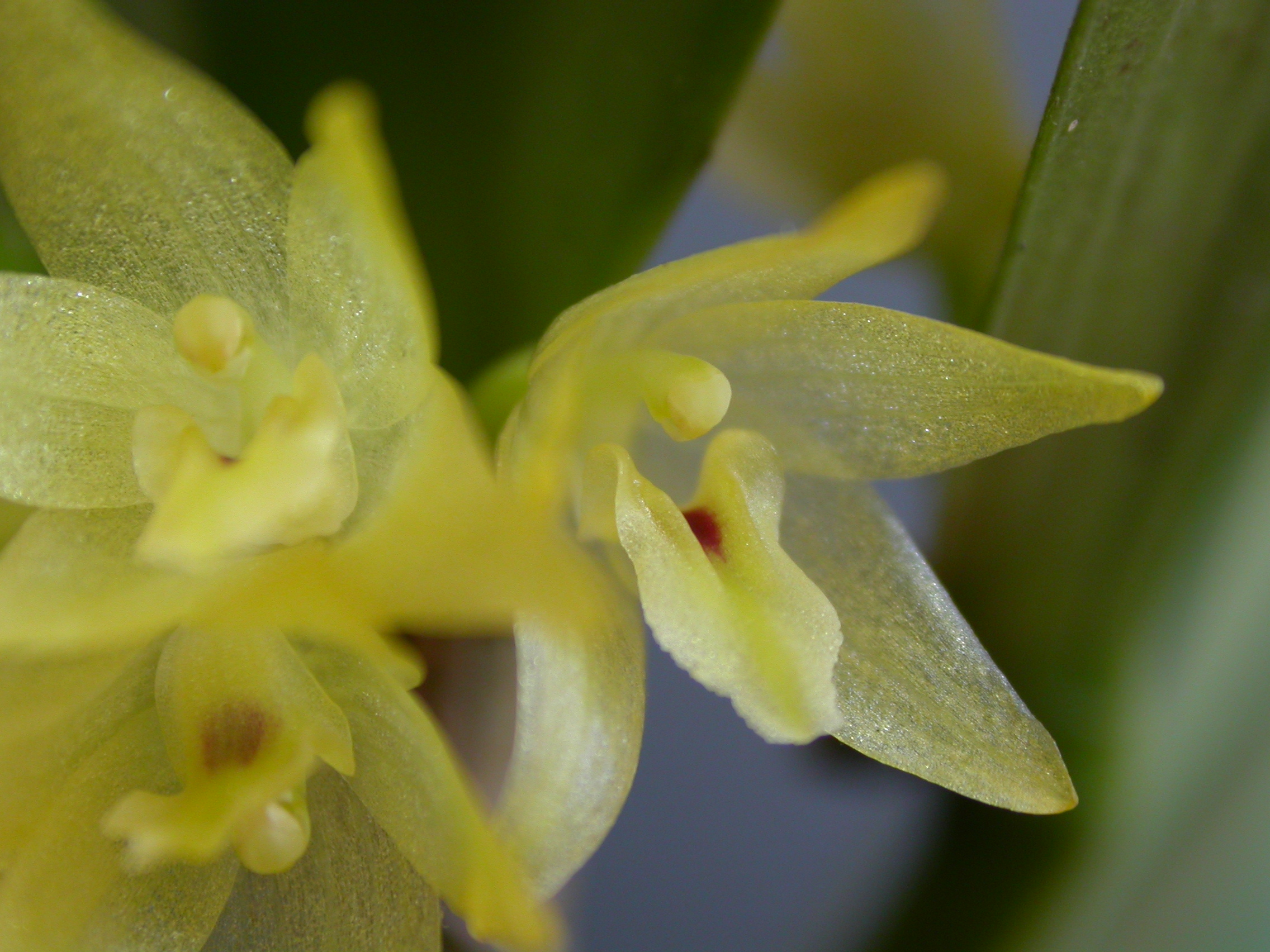

Scientific classification
- Kingdom: Plantae
- Clade: Embryophytes
- Clade: Tracheophytes
- Clade: Spermatophytes
- Clade: Angiosperms
- Clade: Monocots
- Order: Asparagales
- Family: Orchidaceae
- Subfamily: Epidendroideae
- Genus: Octomeria
- Species: O. crassifolia

Binomial name
- Octomeria crassifolia Lindl.

Synonyms
- Octomeria densiflora Barb.Rodr.; Octomeria densiflora var. triarticulata Barb.Rodr.; Octomeria crassifolia var. triarticulata (Barb.Rodr.) Cogn.; Octomeria crassifolia var. negrensis Porto & Brade

= Octomeria crassifolia =

Species of orchid

Octomeria crassifolia is a species of orchid found from eastern Ecuador, Brazil, Paraguay, Uruguay and northern Argentina.

It is self-incompatible, and pollinated by flies of the family Sciaridae.

== Images ==
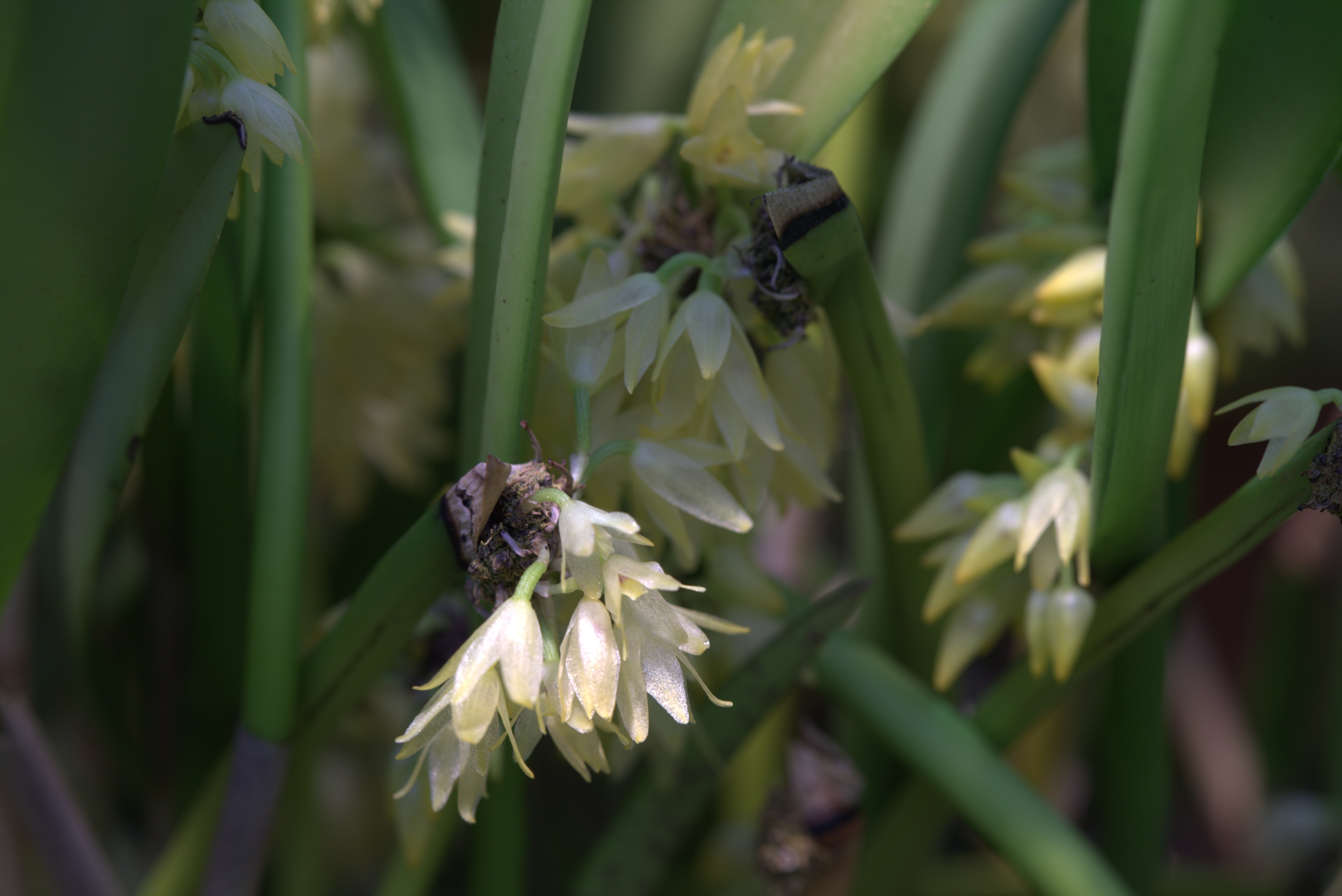
