= Octomeria doucetteana =

Scientific classification
- Kingdom: Plantae
- Clade: Tracheophytes
- Clade: Angiosperms
- Clade: Monocots
- Order: Asparagales
- Family: Orchidaceae
- Subfamily: Epidendroideae
- Genus: Octomeria
- Species: O. doucetteana

Binomial name
- Octomeria doucetteana L.E.Matthews

Species of flowering plant

Octomeria doucetteana is a species of flowering plant in the family Orchidaceae. It is a presumably epiphytic plant with fleshy leaves and yellow flowers. The species is thought to be native to Ecuador, and was described in 2018.

== Taxonomy ==
The species was described by Luke E. Matthews in 2018. It was discovered in Alfonso Doucette's collection.

== Distribution ==
Octomeria doucetteana is thought to be native to the wet tropical biome of Ecuador.

== Description ==
Octomeria doucetteana is caespitose, 6.5–10.6 centimetres (2.6–4.2 in) tall, and is presumed to be an epiphyte. The stem is 3.5–4.5 centimetres (1.4–1.8 in) long, and around 1.5 millimetres (0.059 in) wide. The leaves are narrowly elliptical, fleshy, 3–4.5 centimetres (1.2–1.8 in) long, and 6.8–6.9 millimetres (0.27–0.27 in) wide.

The inflorescence is a fascicle with one to three flowers. The inflorescence stem is around 0.5 millimetres (0.020 in) long. The flower stem is around 1 millimetre (0.039 in) long. The flowers are resupinate. The dorsal sepal is around 3.2 millimetres (0.13 in) long, around 1.9 millimetres (0.075 in) wide, oblong-ovate or triangular, translucent, yellow, and suffused with peach at the tip. The lateral sepals are oblong, translucent, yellow, and suffused with purple and brown. The lateral sepals are around 3.7 millimetres (0.15 in) long, and around 1.7 millimetres (0.067 in) wide. The petals are oblong-lanceolate, around 3.3 millimetres (0.13 in) long, around 1.6 millimetres (0.063 in) wide, and have a similar colour to the sepals. The lip is yellow and purple, around 1.7 millimetres (0.067 in) long, around 1.2 millimetres (0.047 in) wide, and has three lobes. The column is cream, around 1.3 millimetres (0.051 in) long, and around 0.5 millimetres (0.020 in) wide.

Octomeria doucetteana is similar to Octomeria portillae.

== Etymology ==
Octomeria doucetteana is named in honour of Alfonso Doucette.
