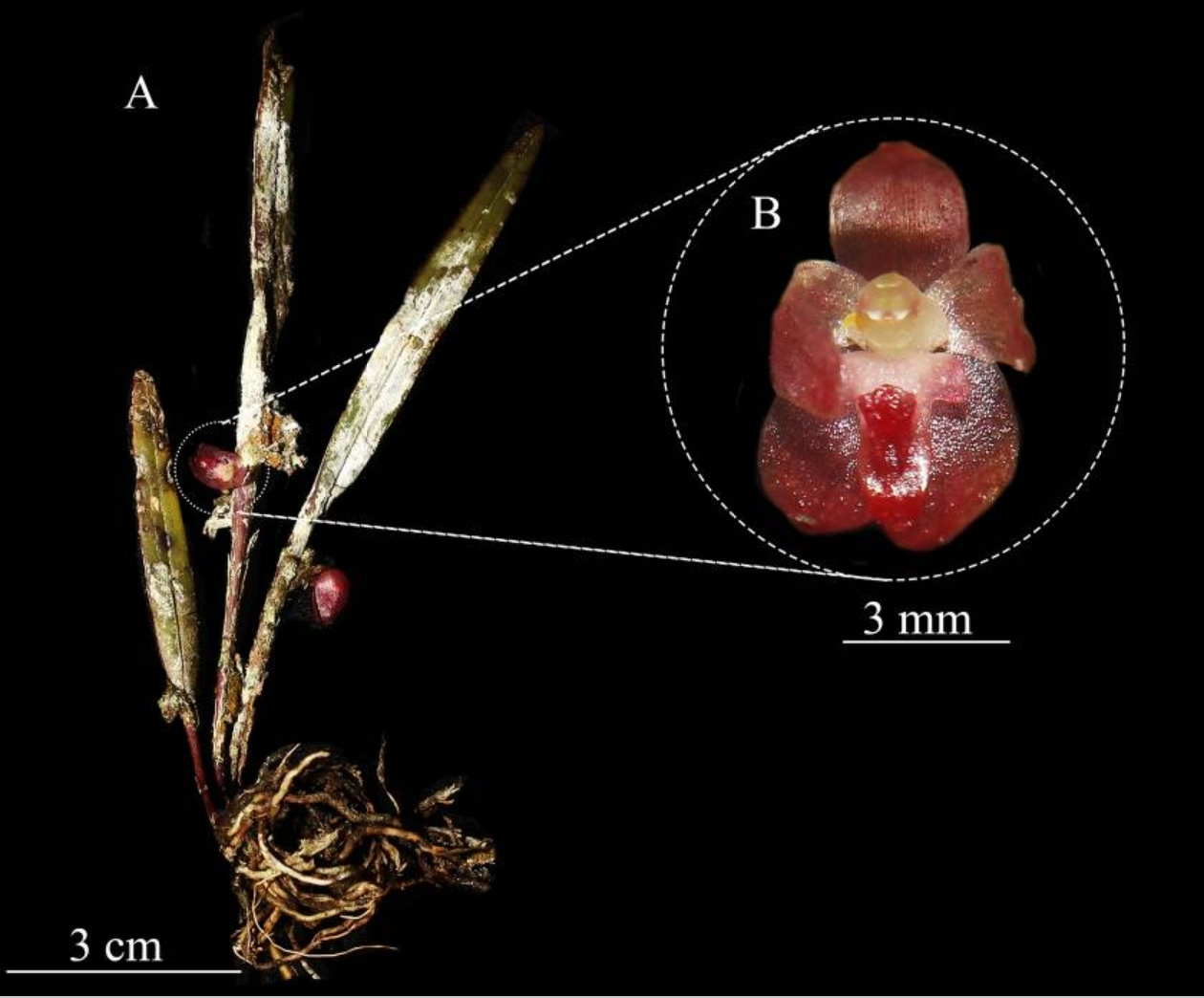

Conservation status
- CITES Appendix II

Scientific classification
- Kingdom: Plantae
- Clade: Tracheophytes
- Clade: Angiosperms
- Clade: Monocots
- Order: Asparagales
- Family: Orchidaceae
- Subfamily: Epidendroideae
- Genus: Octomeria
- Species: O. odontoglossoides

Binomial name
- Octomeria odontoglossoides Luer

= Octomeria odontoglossoides =

Species of flowering plant

Octomeria odontoglossoides is a species of flowering plant in the family Orchidaceae. It is an epiphyte native to Colombia and Ecuador. The species was described in 2010, and is listed in Appendix II of CITES.

== Taxonomy ==
The species was described by Carlyle A. Luer in 2010. The type specimen was collected from an unknown location in Colombia, and "purchased from a local collector."

== Distribution ==
Octomeria odontoglossoides is native to the wet tropial biome of Colombia. In 2023, it was collected from El Pangui Canton, in south-eastern Ecuador.

The species grows on tree trunks in the foothill forests of the Cordillera del Cóndor, at elevations of 900–1,100 metres (3,000–3,600 ft).

== Description ==
Octomeria odontoglossoides is an epiphyte.

== Conservation ==
Octomeria odontoglossoides is listed in Appendix II of CITES. There are no quotas or suspensions in place for the species.
