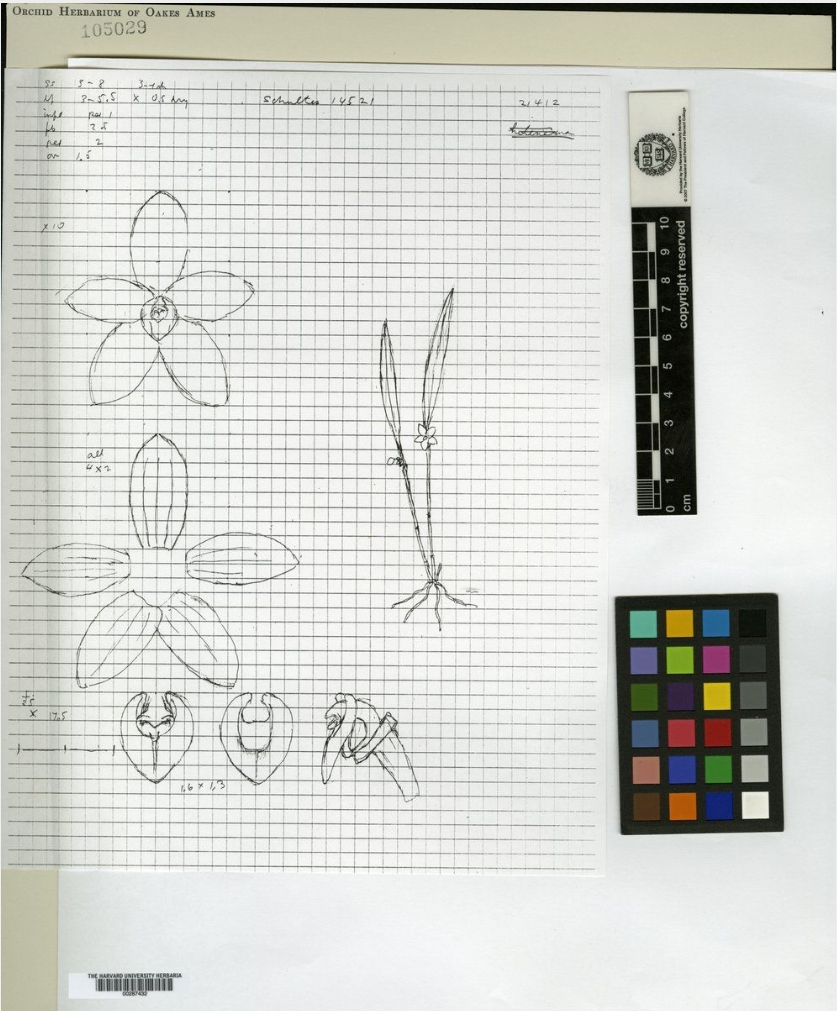
- Illustration

Conservation status
- CITES Appendix II

Scientific classification
- Kingdom: Plantae
- Clade: Tracheophytes
- Clade: Angiosperms
- Clade: Monocots
- Order: Asparagales
- Family: Orchidaceae
- Subfamily: Epidendroideae
- Genus: Octomeria
- Species: O. zygoglossa

Binomial name
- Octomeria zygoglossa Luer

= Octomeria zygoglossa =

Species of flowering plant

Octomeria zygoglossa is a species of flowering plant in the family Orchidaceae. It is an epiphyte.

The species is native to Colombia. It was named in 2010, and is listed in Appendix II of CITES.

== Taxonomy ==
Octomeria zygoglossa was named by Carlyle A. Luer in 2010.

== Distribution ==
Octomeria zygoglossa is native to the wet tropical biome of Colombia.

== Conservation ==
Octomeria zygoglossa is listed in Appendix II of CITES. There are no quotas or suspensions in place for the species.
