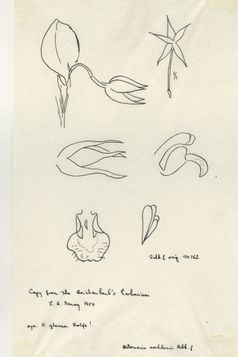

Conservation status
- CITES Appendix II

Scientific classification
- Kingdom: Plantae
- Clade: Tracheophytes
- Clade: Angiosperms
- Clade: Monocots
- Order: Asparagales
- Family: Orchidaceae
- Subfamily: Epidendroideae
- Genus: Octomeria
- Species: O. cochlearis

Binomial name
- Octomeria cochlearis Rchb.f.

Synonyms
- Octomeria supra-glauca Rolfe

= Octomeria cochlearis =

Species of flowering plant

Octomeria cochlearis is a species of flowering plant in the family Orchidaceae. It is an epiphyte endemic to Brazil. The species was described in 1881, and is listed in Appendix II of CITES.

== Taxonomy ==
The species was described by Heinrich Gustav Reichenbach in 1881.

== Distribution ==
Octomeria cochlearis is native to the seasonally dry tropical biome of south-east Brazil. It is found only in the state of Rio de Janeiro, where it grows in high altitude grasslands and tropical rainforests.

== Description ==
Octomeria cochlearis is an epiphytic herb.

== Conservation ==
Octomeria cochlearis is listed in Appendix II of CITES. There are no quotas or suspensions in place for the species.
