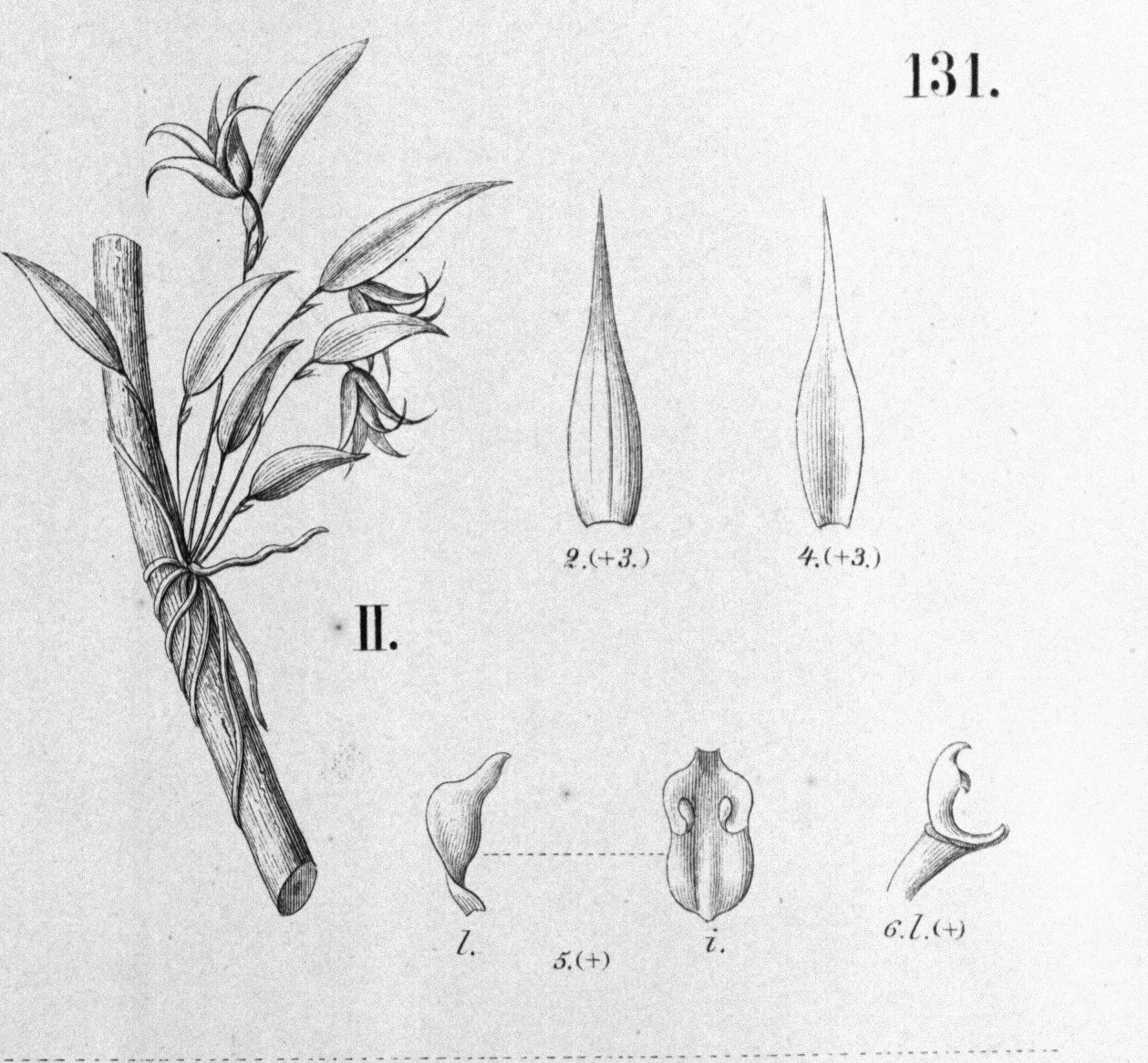

Conservation status
- CITES Appendix II

Scientific classification
- Kingdom: Plantae
- Clade: Tracheophytes
- Clade: Angiosperms
- Clade: Monocots
- Order: Asparagales
- Family: Orchidaceae
- Subfamily: Epidendroideae
- Genus: Octomeria
- Species: O. ochroleuca

Binomial name
- Octomeria ochroleuca Barb.Rodr.

Synonyms
- Octomeria ochroleuca var. trilobata Porto & Brade

= Octomeria ochroleuca =

Species of flowering plant

Octomeria ochroleuca is a species of flowering plant in the family Orchidaceae. It is an epiphyte native to Brazil. The species was described in 1877, and is listed in Appendix II of CITES.

== Taxonomy ==
The species was described in 1877 by João Barbosa Rodrigues.

== Distribution ==
Octomeria ochroleuca is native to the seasonally dry tropical biome of south-east Brazil.

== Description ==
Octomeria ochroleuca is an epiphyte.

== Conservation ==
Octomeria ochroleuca is listed in Appendix II of CITES. There are no quotas or suspenions in place for the species.
