= Octomeria nana =

Scientific classification
- Kingdom: Plantae
- Clade: Tracheophytes
- Clade: Angiosperms
- Clade: Monocots
- Order: Asparagales
- Family: Orchidaceae
- Subfamily: Epidendroideae
- Genus: Octomeria
- Species: O. nana

Binomial name
- Octomeria nana C.Schweinf., Bot. Mus. Leafl. 19: 211, 1961

Species of orchid

Octomeria nana is an orchid species in the genus Octomeria found in Venezuela. It is an epiphyte with yellow-brown flowers. The species is named for its small size.

== Description ==
Octomeria nana is a small epiphyte. The stem is slender, 8–25 millimetres (0.31–0.98 in) long, and surrounded by two tubular sheaths. The leaf is thickly leathery, narrowly ovate, 12–40 millimetres (0.47–1.57 in) long, and 5–6 millimetres (0.20–0.24 in) wide.

The inflorescences have one or two flowers, with stems around 1 millimetre (0.039 in) long. The sepals are yellow-brown, translucent, and ovate to narrowly ovate. The dorsal and lateral sepals are 4–6.5 millimetres (0.16–0.26 in) long, around 2 millimetres (0.079 in) wide, and have three veins. The petals are yellow-brown, ovate to narrowly ovate, 4–6 millimetres (0.16–0.24 in) long, 1.5–1.75 millimetres (0.059–0.069 in) wide, and have three veins. The lip is oblong or subquadrate, around 2.5 millimetres (0.098 in) long, and around 2 millimetres (0.079 in) wide. The column is semi-cylindrical, and around 1.5 millimetres (0.059 in) long.

== Etymology ==
The specific epithet nana is derived from the Latin nanus, and refers to the species' small habit.
