= Octomeria deceptrix =

Conservation status
- CITES Appendix II

Scientific classification
- Kingdom: Plantae
- Clade: Tracheophytes
- Clade: Angiosperms
- Clade: Monocots
- Order: Asparagales
- Family: Orchidaceae
- Subfamily: Epidendroideae
- Genus: Octomeria
- Species: O. deceptrix

Binomial name
- Octomeria deceptrix Luer

Species of flowering plant

Octomeria deceptrix is a species of flowering plant in the family Orchidaceae. It is an epiphyte native to Venezuela and Ecuador. The species was described in 2010, and is listed in Appendix II of CITES.

== Taxonomy ==
The species was described by Carlyle A. Luer in 2010.

== Distribution ==
Octomeria deceptrix is native to the wet tropical biome of Venezuela and Ecuador.

== Description ==
Octomeria deceptrix is an epiphyte.

== Conservation ==
Octomeria deceptrix is listed in Appendix II of CITES. There are no quotas or suspensions in place for the species.
