= Guido Frederico João Pabst =

Brazilian botanist

Guido Frederico João Pabst (born 19 September 1914 in Porto Alegre, died 27 April 1980 in Rio de Janeiro) was a Brazilian botanist. With his friend Edmundo Pereira, he founded the Herbarium Bradeanum in Rio de Janeiro.

== Works ==
- Pabst, G.F.J.; Dungs, F.; Mee, M.; Salvado, S.; Brade, A.C. (1975). Orchidaceae Brasilienses. Vol. 1. Brücke-Verlag Schmersow.
- Pabst, G.F.J.; Dungs, F. (1977). Orchidaceae brasilienses. Vol. 2. Brücke-Verlag K. Schmersow.
