= Frederico Carlos Hoehne =

Frederico Carlos Hoehne (1 February 1882, Juiz de Fora – 16 March 1959) was a Brazilian botanist.

In 1907 he was appointed jardineiro-chefe (head gardener) at the National Museum in Rio de Janeiro, soon afterwards working on botanical assignments in the nation's interior, such as: a survey mission arranged by the Rondon Commission (1908-1909), and the Roosevelt-Rondon Scientific Expedition of 1913–1914. From 1910 to 1923 he issued numerous botanical reports as a result of findings from his expeditions.

In 1918 he began work at the Instituto de Botánica in São Paulo, where in 1942 he was appointed director of the institute. Here he remained until his death in 1959.

His major work, Flora Brasilica, was started in 1940 and continued after his death by Alcides Ribeiro Teixeira. He was the author of studies on epiphytes, cinchona, toxic and medicinal plants, aquatic plants and more than 50 articles on the local flora of São Paulo. The following are of few of his principal publications:

- Botanica / Commissão de Linhas Telegraphicas Estrategicas de Matto Grosso ao Amazonas 1910 - Botany / Commission for strategic telegraph lines of Mato Grosso and Amazonas.
- Bromeliaceas e Orchidaceas, 1916 - Bromeliaceae and Orchidaceae.
- Araucarilandia, 1930.
- Leguminosas - Papilionadas, 1940–41.
- Aristolochiaceas, 1942 - Aristolochiaceae.
- Iconografia de Orchidaceas do Brasil, 1949 - Iconography of Orchidaceae of Brazil.

The botanical journal Hoehnea is named in his honour, as are the genera Hoehnephytum, Hoehnea, and Hoehneella.
