= C. cinnabarina =

C. cinnabarina may refer to:

- Calonectria cinnabarina, an ascomycete fungus
- Caloplaca cinnabarina, an Australian lichen
- Calostoma cinnabarina, a gasteroid fungus
- Canna cinnabarina, a garden plant
- Cattleya cinnabarina, a New World orchid
- Compsothespis cinnabarina, a praying mantis
- Crocosmia cinnabarina, a flowering plant
- Cryptachaea cinnabarina, a Brazilian spider
- Cystodermella cinnabarina, a basidiomycete fungus
