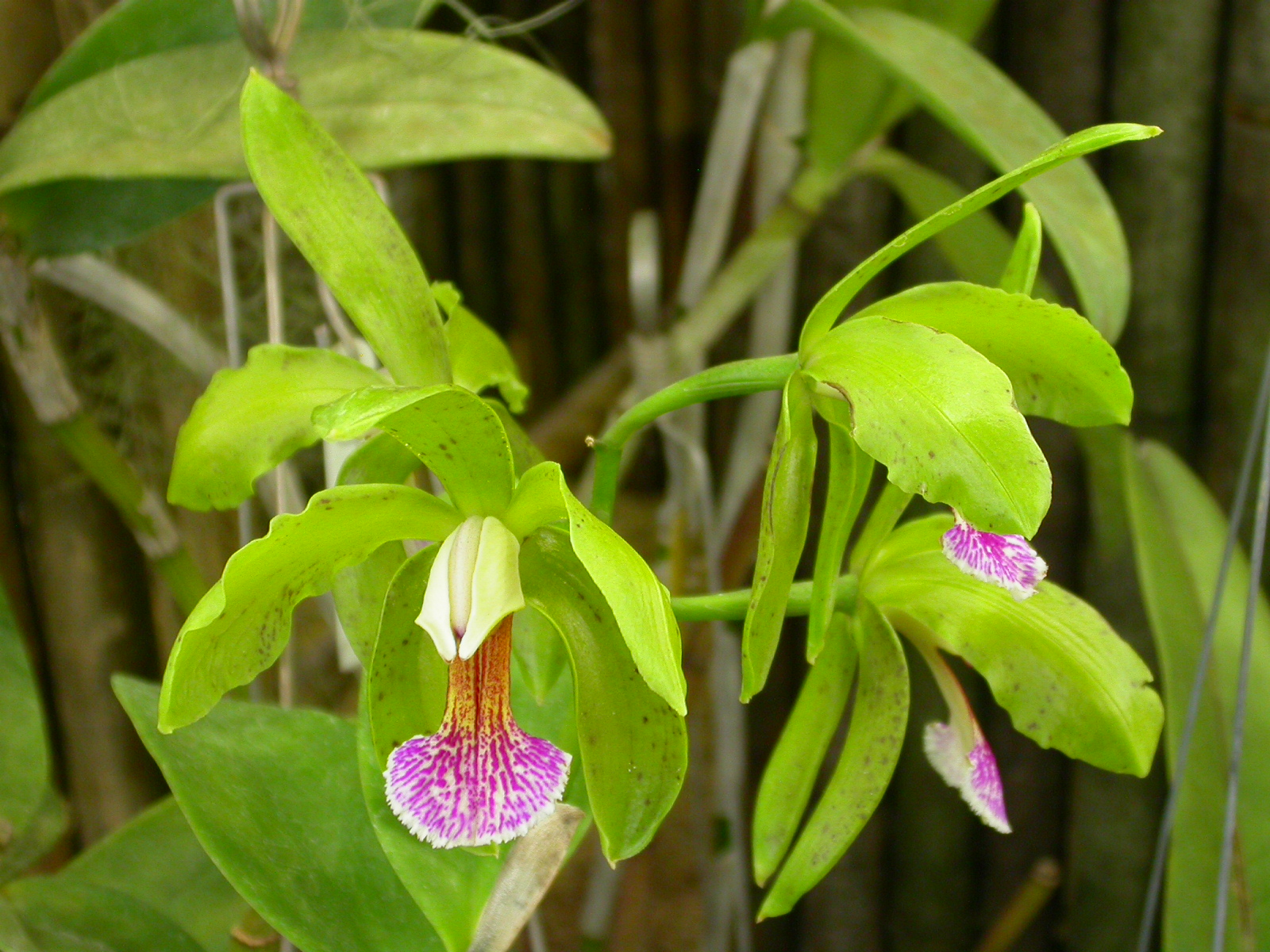

Scientific classification
- Kingdom: Plantae
- Clade: Tracheophytes
- Clade: Angiosperms
- Clade: Monocots
- Order: Asparagales
- Family: Orchidaceae
- Subfamily: Epidendroideae
- Genus: Cattleya
- Subgenus: Cattleya subg. Intermediae
- Species: C. granulosa

Binomial name
- Cattleya granulosa Lindl.

Synonyms
- Epidendrum granulosum (Lindl.) Rchb.f.; Cattleya granulosa var. russelliana Lindl.; Cattleya granulosa var. buyssoniana O'Brien

= Cattleya granulosa =

Species of orchid

Cattleya granulosa (the "granulose Cattleya") is a bifoliate Cattleya species of orchid. It is endemic to Brazil; the type specimen was reported to come from Guatemala, but this is likely erroneous. The diploid chromosome number of C. granulosa has been determined as 2n = 40.
