= Cattleya schofieldiana =

Scientific classification
- Kingdom: Plantae
- Clade: Tracheophytes
- Clade: Angiosperms
- Clade: Monocots
- Order: Asparagales
- Family: Orchidaceae
- Subfamily: Epidendroideae
- Genus: Cattleya
- Subgenus: Cattleya subg. Intermediae
- Species: C. schofieldiana

Binomial name
- Cattleya schofieldiana Rchb.f.

Synonyms
- Cattleya granulosa var. schofieldiana (Rchb.f.) H.J. Veitch; Cattleya princeps auct.; Cattleya granulosa var. banneri Rolfe; Cattleya schofieldiana var. banneri (Rolfe) Fowlie

Species of orchid

Cattleya schofieldiana is a species of bifoliate Cattleya orchid.
