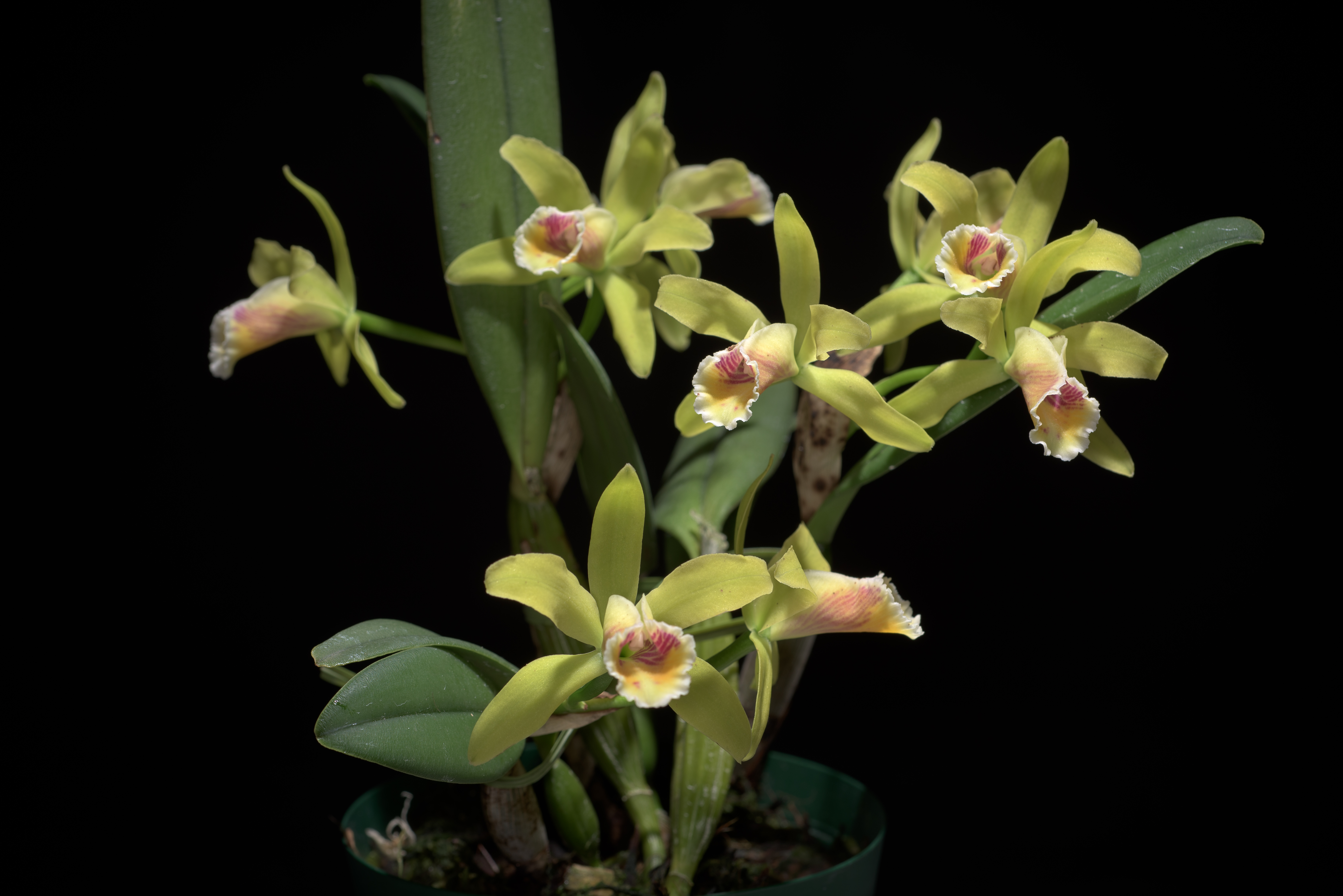

Scientific classification
- Kingdom: Plantae
- Clade: Tracheophytes
- Clade: Angiosperms
- Clade: Monocots
- Order: Asparagales
- Family: Orchidaceae
- Subfamily: Epidendroideae
- Genus: Cattleya
- Subgenus: Cattleya subg. Cattleya
- Section: Cattleya sect. Cattleya
- Species: C. luteola

Binomial name
- Cattleya luteola Lindl.

Synonyms
- Epidendrum luteolum (Lindl.) Rchb.f.; Cattleya epidendroides Rchb.f.; Cattleya flavida Klotzsch; Cattleya holfordii Rchb.f.; Cattleya meyeri Regel; Cattleya modesta Mey. ex Regel; Cattleya luteola var. roezlii Rchb.f.

= Cattleya luteola =

Species of plant

Cattleya luteola is a species of orchid, native to the lowland Amazon rainforest. It is present in Ecuador, Peru, Brazil and Bolivia.
