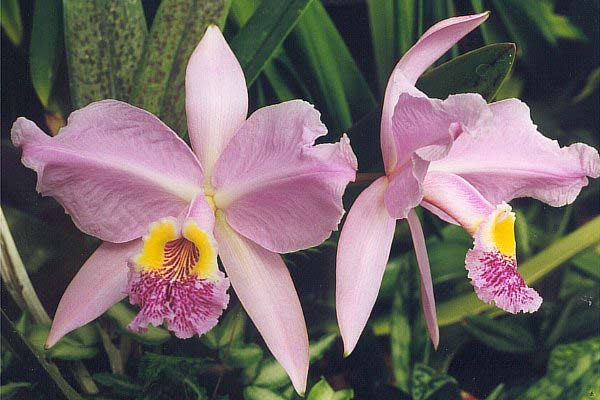

Scientific classification
- Kingdom: Plantae
- Clade: Tracheophytes
- Clade: Angiosperms
- Clade: Monocots
- Order: Asparagales
- Family: Orchidaceae
- Subfamily: Epidendroideae
- Genus: Cattleya
- Subgenus: Cattleya subg. Cattleya
- Section: Cattleya sect. Lawrenceanae
- Species: C. lueddemanniana

Binomial name
- Cattleya lueddemanniana Rchb.f.

Synonyms
- Cattleya bassetii A.H.Kent; Cattleya dawsonii R. Warner; Cattleya roezlii Rchb.f.; Cattleya speciosissima auct.

= Cattleya lueddemanniana =

Species of orchid

Cattleya lueddemanniana is a labiate Cattleya species of orchid. The diploid chromosome number of C. lueddemanniana has been determined as 2n = 40.
