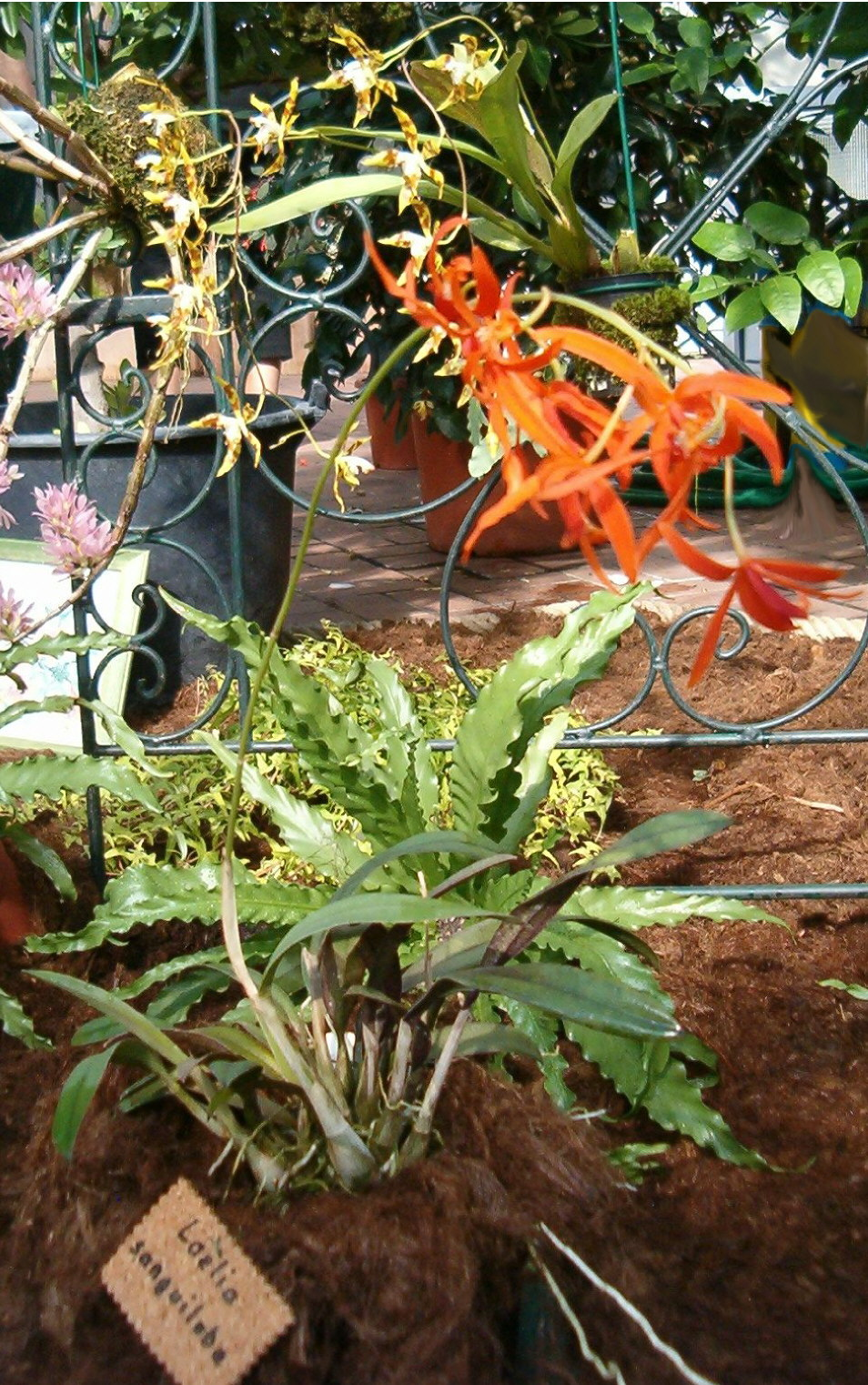
- Sophronitis sanguiloba habitus and flowers

Scientific classification
- Kingdom: Plantae
- Clade: Tracheophytes
- Clade: Angiosperms
- Clade: Monocots
- Order: Asparagales
- Family: Orchidaceae
- Subfamily: Epidendroideae
- Genus: Cattleya
- Subgenus: Cattleya subg. Cattleya
- Section: Cattleya sect. Crispae
- Species: C. sanguiloba

Binomial name
- Cattleya sanguiloba (Withner) Van den Berg & M.W.Chase

Synonyms
- Laelia sanguiloba Withner; Hoffmannseggella sanguiloba (Withner) V.P.Castro & Chiron

= Cattleya sanguiloba =

Red-lobed cattleya

Species of orchid

Cattleya sanguiloba (the "bloody-lipped Cattleya"), also known by the synonym Laelia sanguiloba.

It is a species of orchid endemic to the state Bahia located in southeastern Brazil.

It is native to the Atlantic Forest biome (Mata Atlantica Brasileira) habitats there.
