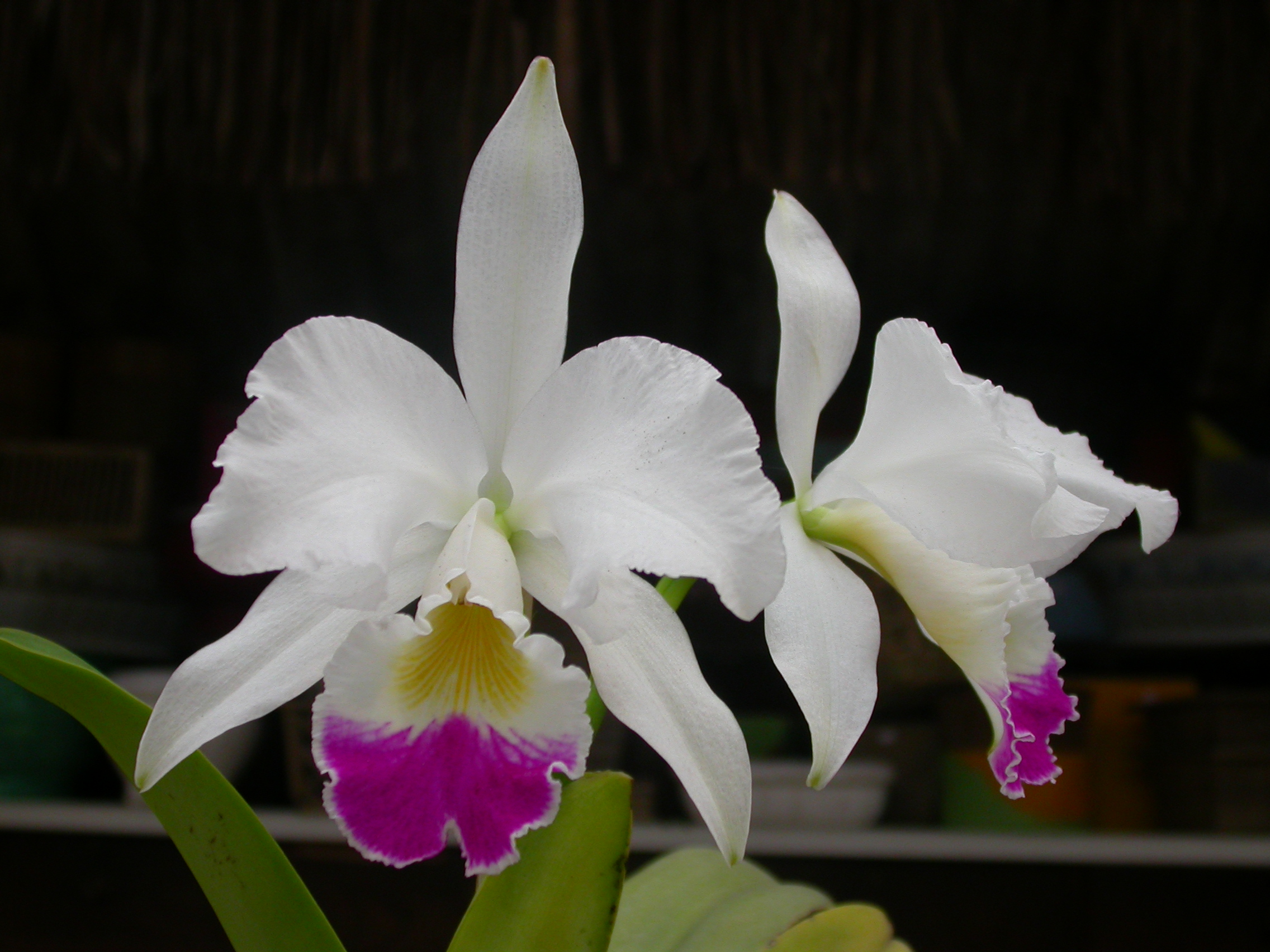

Scientific classification
- Kingdom: Plantae
- Clade: Tracheophytes
- Clade: Angiosperms
- Clade: Monocots
- Order: Asparagales
- Family: Orchidaceae
- Subfamily: Epidendroideae
- Genus: Cattleya
- Subgenus: Cattleya subg. Cattleya
- Section: Cattleya sect. Cattleya
- Species: C. warneri

Binomial name
- Cattleya warneri T. Moore ex R. Warner

Synonyms
- Cattleya trilabiata Barb.Rodr.; Cattleya labiata var. warneri (T. Moore ex R. Warner) H.J. Veitch; Cattleya warneri var. amoena L.C. Menezes; Cattleya warneri var. caerulea L.C. Menezes; Cattleya warneri var. semialba L.C. Menezes

= Cattleya warneri =

Species of orchid

Cattleya warneri is a labiate Cattleya species of orchid. The diploid chromosome number of C. warneri has been determined as 2n = 40.
