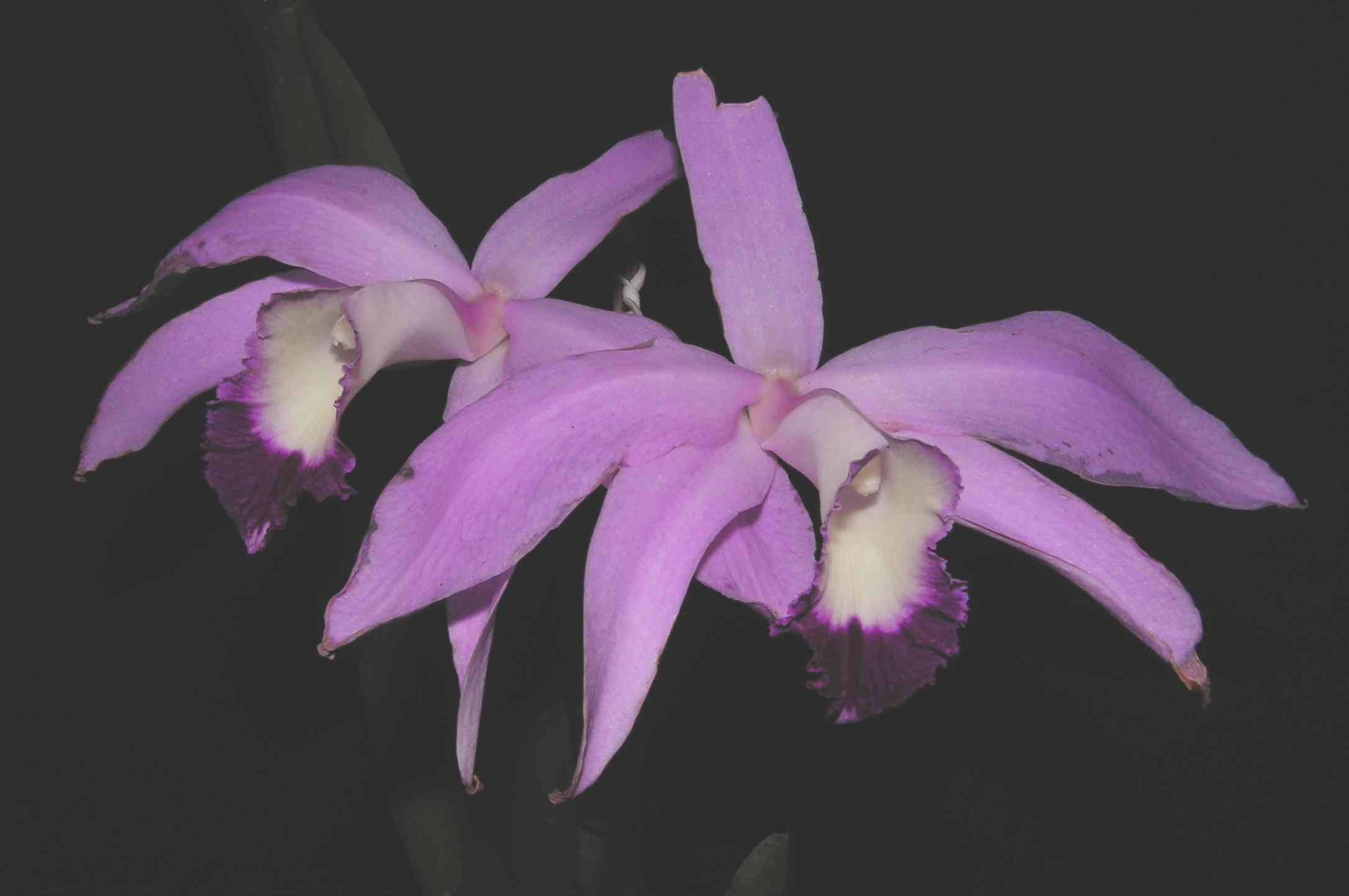
- Cattleya perrinii flower

Scientific classification
- Kingdom: Plantae
- Clade: Tracheophytes
- Clade: Angiosperms
- Clade: Monocots
- Order: Asparagales
- Family: Orchidaceae
- Subfamily: Epidendroideae
- Genus: Cattleya
- Subgenus: Cattleya subg. Cattleya
- Section: Cattleya sect. Crispae
- Species: C. perrinii

Binomial name
- Cattleya perrinii Lindl.

Synonyms
- Amalia perrinii (Lindl.) Heynh.; Laelia perrinii (Lindl.) Bateman; Bletia perrinii (Lindl.) Rchb.f.; Hadrolaelia perrinii (Lindl.) Chiron & V.P.Castro; Sophronitis perrinii (Lindl.) Van den Berg & M.W.Chase

= Cattleya perrinii =

Perrin's cattleya

Species of orchid

Cattleya perrinii, commonly known as the Perrin's sophronitis, is a species of orchid endemic to southeastern Brazil.
