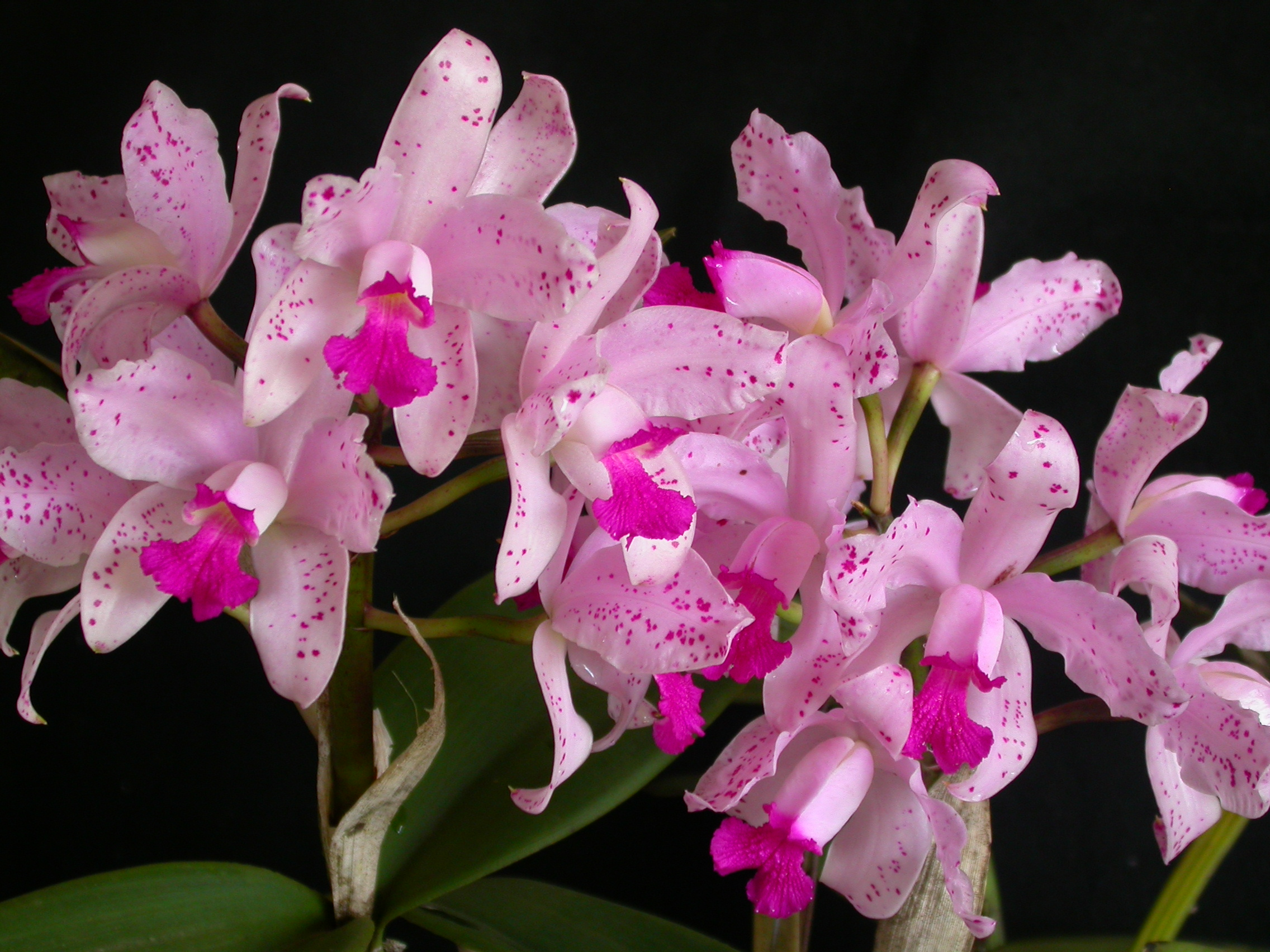

Scientific classification
- Kingdom: Plantae
- Clade: Tracheophytes
- Clade: Angiosperms
- Clade: Monocots
- Order: Asparagales
- Family: Orchidaceae
- Subfamily: Epidendroideae
- Genus: Cattleya
- Subgenus: Cattleya subg. Intermediae
- Species: C. amethystoglossa

Binomial name
- Cattleya amethystoglossa Linden & Rchb.f. ex Warner

= Cattleya amethystoglossa =

Species of orchid

Cattleya amethystoglossa (the "amethyst-lipped Cattley flower") is a bifoliate species of orchid from the genus Cattleya.

C. amethystoglossa is native to Brazil in the states of Bahia and possibly Espírito Santo, where it is found near sea level in close proximity to the Atlantic Ocean. C. amethystoglossa grows on palm tree trunks, rock, and large tree branches high in the canopy of evergreen trees. This plant is found growing in bright, airy, humid locations. Its native range has been greatly reduced due to habitat destruction, logging, and agriculture.

C. amethystoglossa is a tall plant and has pseudobulbs that grow to 3 feet (0.91 meters) tall. Each pseudobulb has two (occasionally three) leathery, green leaves at the top. This species is in the Bifoliate division of Cattleyas.

The flowers of C. amethystoglossa grow to 4 inches (10 cm) in diameter. Flowers are produced on terminal flower stems that develop at the apex of the pseudobulb. The unbranched inflorescence produces between ten and 30 blooms. C. amethystoglossa is fragrant. The petals and sepals are light lavender to pale rose in color with mauve or magenta spotting. The amount of spotting varies widely between individuals with some individuals demonstrating few spots. The lip is bright magenta in color and partially wraps around the column. The throat varies in color from white to pale yellow or gold. Flowers are produced from late fall to early spring.

C. amethystoglossa grows best in intermediate or warm growing conditions.

This species is closely related to C. guttata in many ways but differs in flower color and other minor botanical details. There have been a few coerulea and alba forms found in the wild.

There are several synonyms for this species: Cattleya amethystoglossa var. lilacina, Cattleya guttata keteleerii, Cattleya guttatta lilacina, Cattleya guttata prinzii, Cattleya guttata var. prinzii, Cattleya purpurina, Epidendrum amethestoglosum, Epidendrum elatius var. prinzii.
