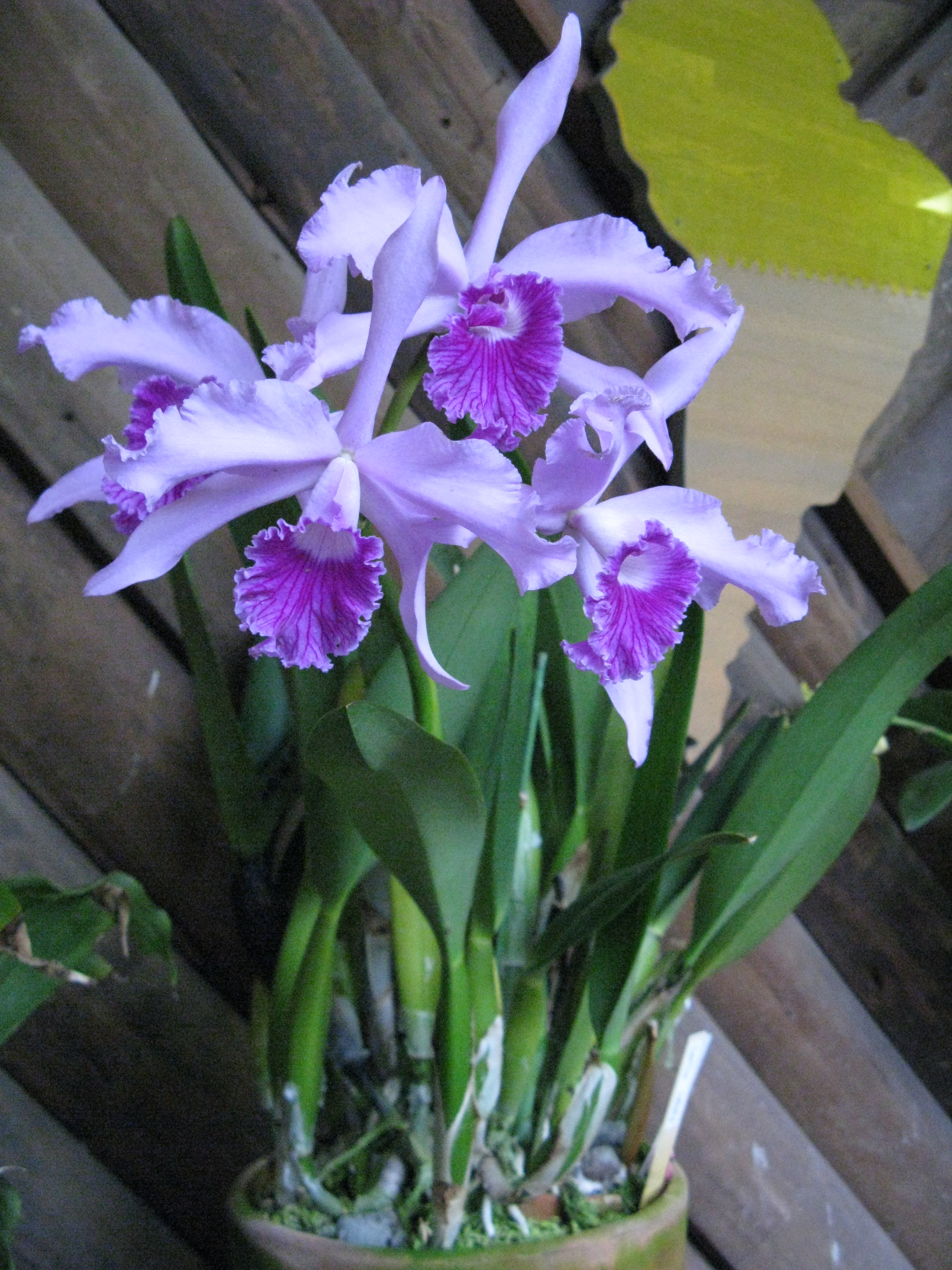

Conservation status
- CITES Appendix I (CITES)

Scientific classification
- Kingdom: Plantae
- Clade: Tracheophytes
- Clade: Angiosperms
- Clade: Monocots
- Order: Asparagales
- Family: Orchidaceae
- Subfamily: Epidendroideae
- Genus: Cattleya
- Subgenus: Cattleya subg. Cattleya
- Section: Cattleya sect. Crispae
- Species: C. lobata

Binomial name
- Cattleya lobata Lindl.

Synonyms
- Cattleya lobata Lindl.; Laelia boothiana Rchb.f; Bletia lobata (Lindl.) Rchb.f.; Bletia boothiana (Rchb.f.) Rchb.f.; Laelia rivieri Carrière; Laelia lobata (Lindl.) H.J.Veitch; Laelia lobata var. alba Occhioni; Hadrolaelia lobata (Lindl.) Chiron & V.P.Castro; Brasilaelia lobata (Lindl.) Gutfreund; Chironiella lobata (Lindl.) Braem

= Cattleya lobata =

Species of orchid

Cattleya lobata, commonly known as the lobed sophronitis, is a species of orchid endemic to Brazil (Minas Gerais).

== Images ==
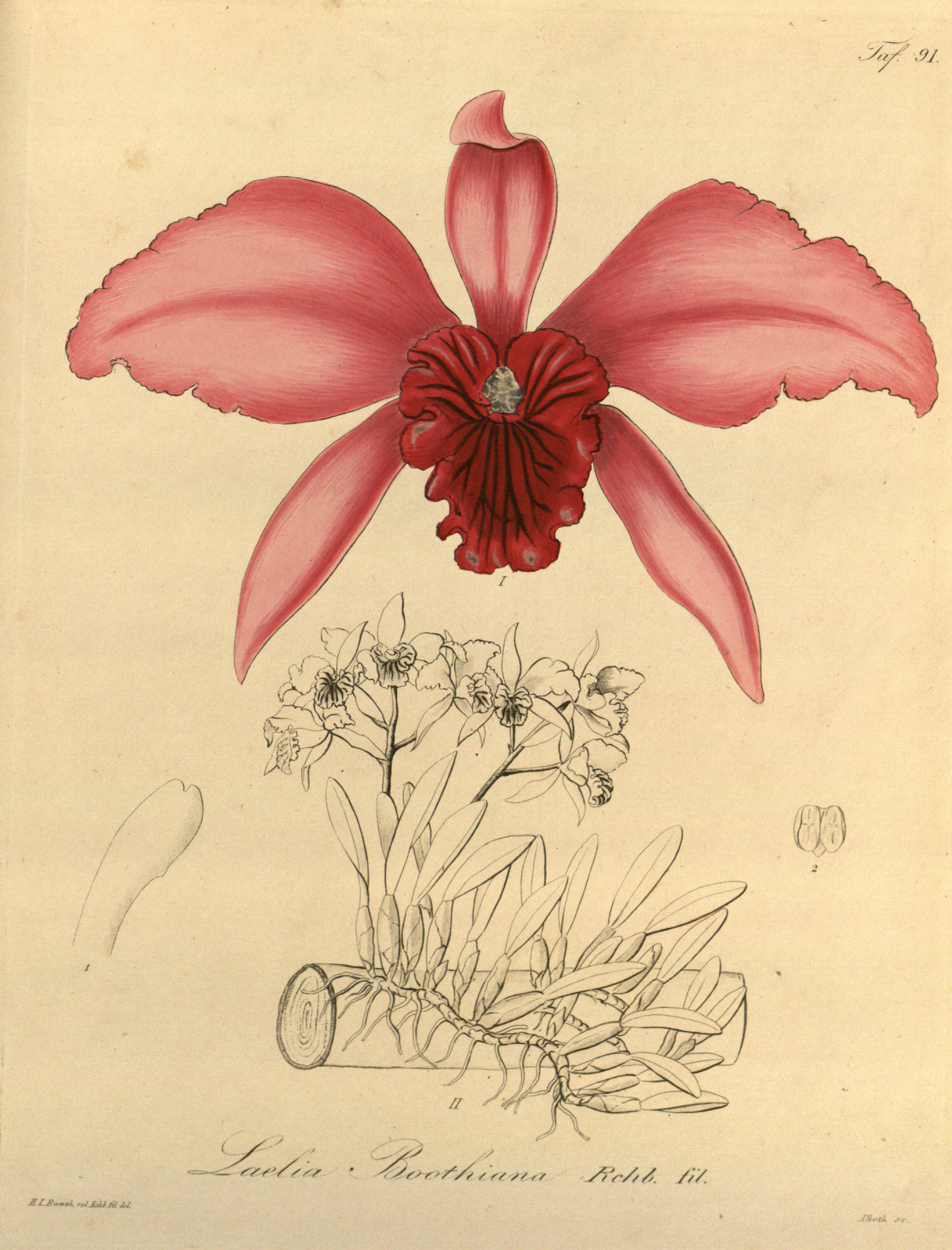
Botanical illustration

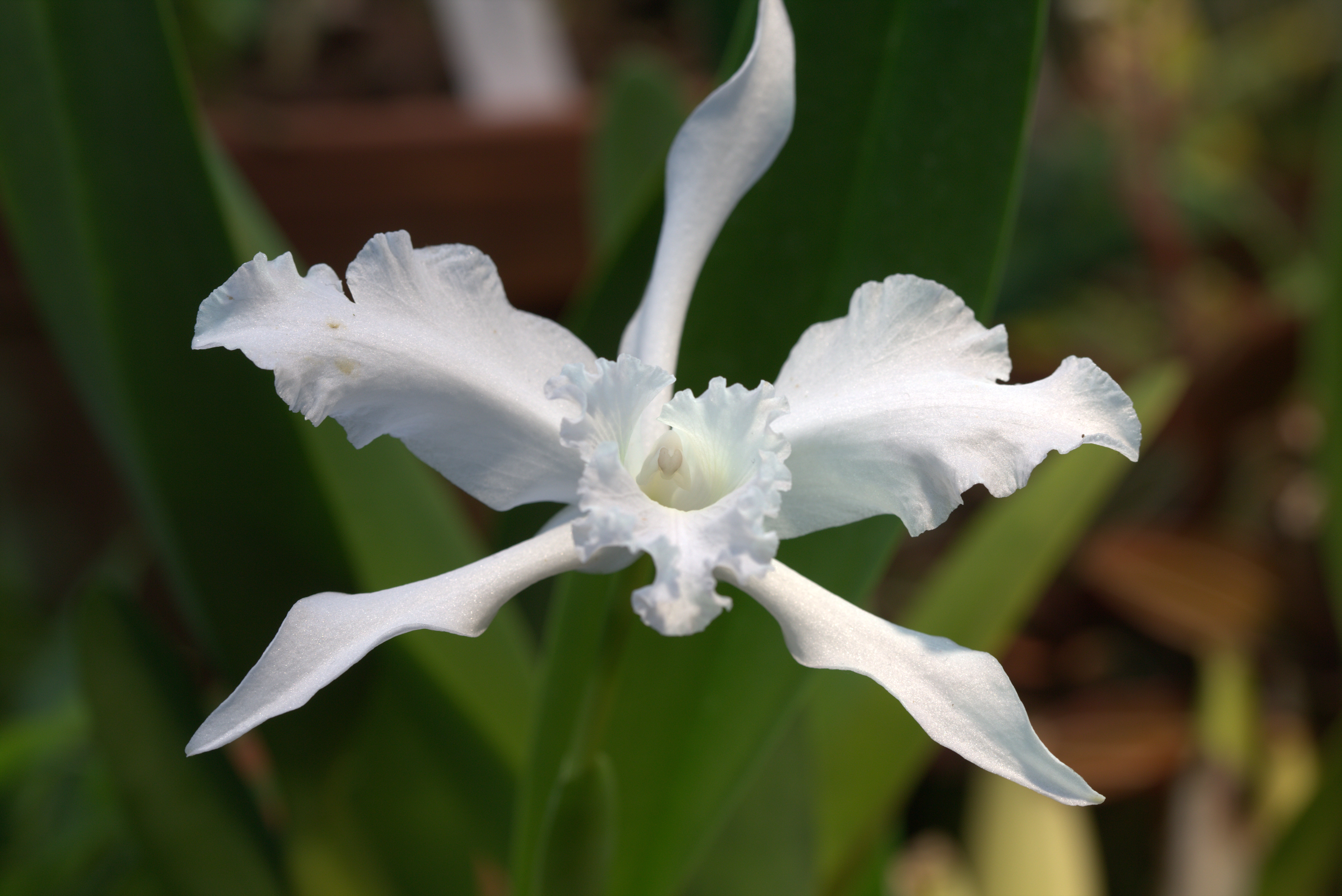
Var. 'Alba'
