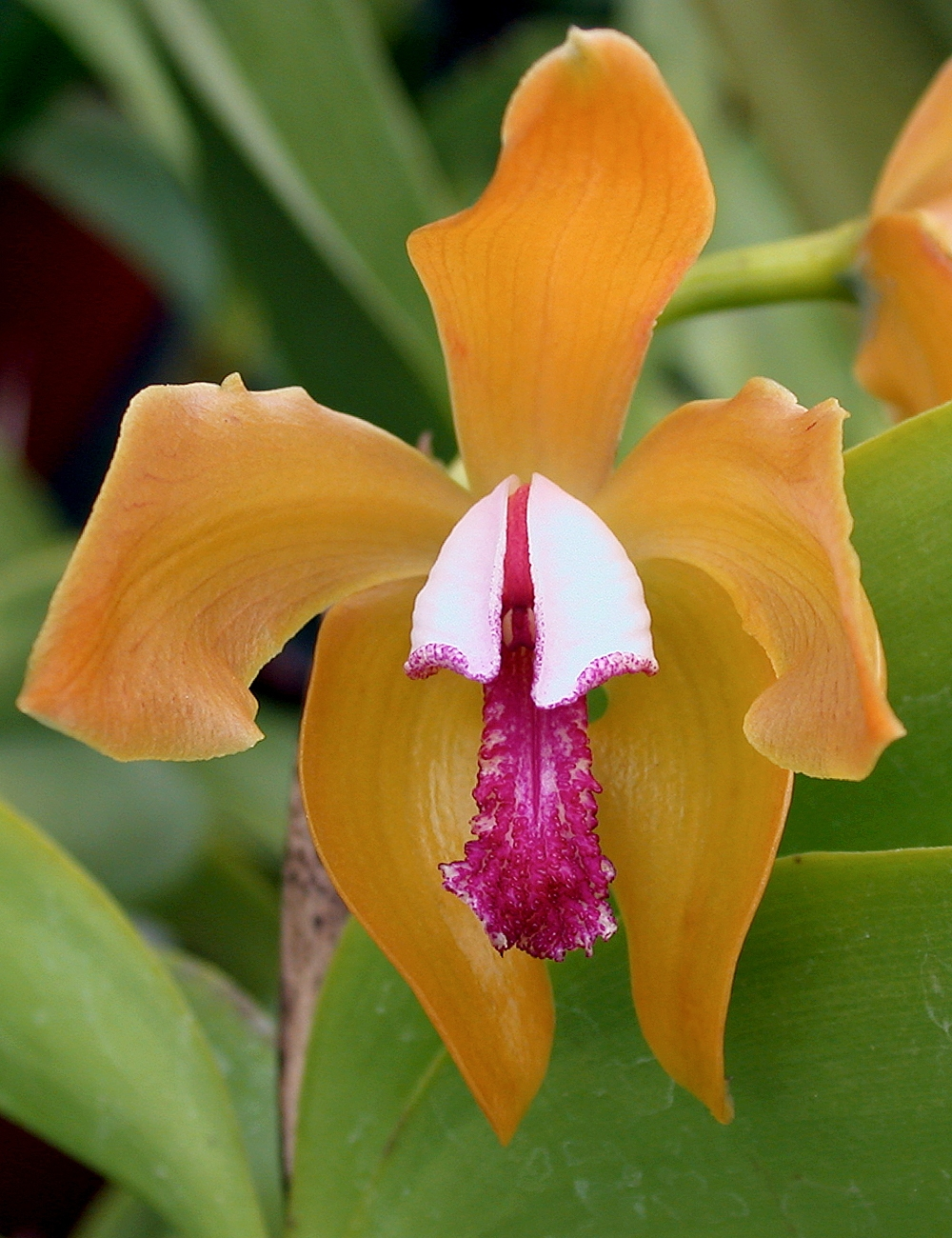

Scientific classification
- Kingdom: Plantae
- Clade: Tracheophytes
- Clade: Angiosperms
- Clade: Monocots
- Order: Asparagales
- Family: Orchidaceae
- Subfamily: Epidendroideae
- Genus: Cattleya
- Species: C. porphyroglossa

Binomial name
- Cattleya porphyroglossa Linden & Rchb.f

Synonyms
- Epidendrum porphyroglossum (Linden & Rchb.f.) Rchb.f.; Cattleya amethystoglossa var. sulphurea Rchb.f.; Cattleya batalinii Sander & Kraenzl.; Cattleya dijanceana Rolfe; Cattleya porphyroglossa var. punctulata Rchb.f.; Cattleya porphyroglossa f. punctulata (Rchb.f.) M.Wolff & O.Gruss; Epidendrum porphyroglossum var. sulphureum (Rchb.f.) Rchb.f.

= Cattleya porphyroglossa =

Species of flowering plant

Cattleya porphyroglossa is a species of flowering plant in the family Orchidaceae. It is endemic to Brazil
