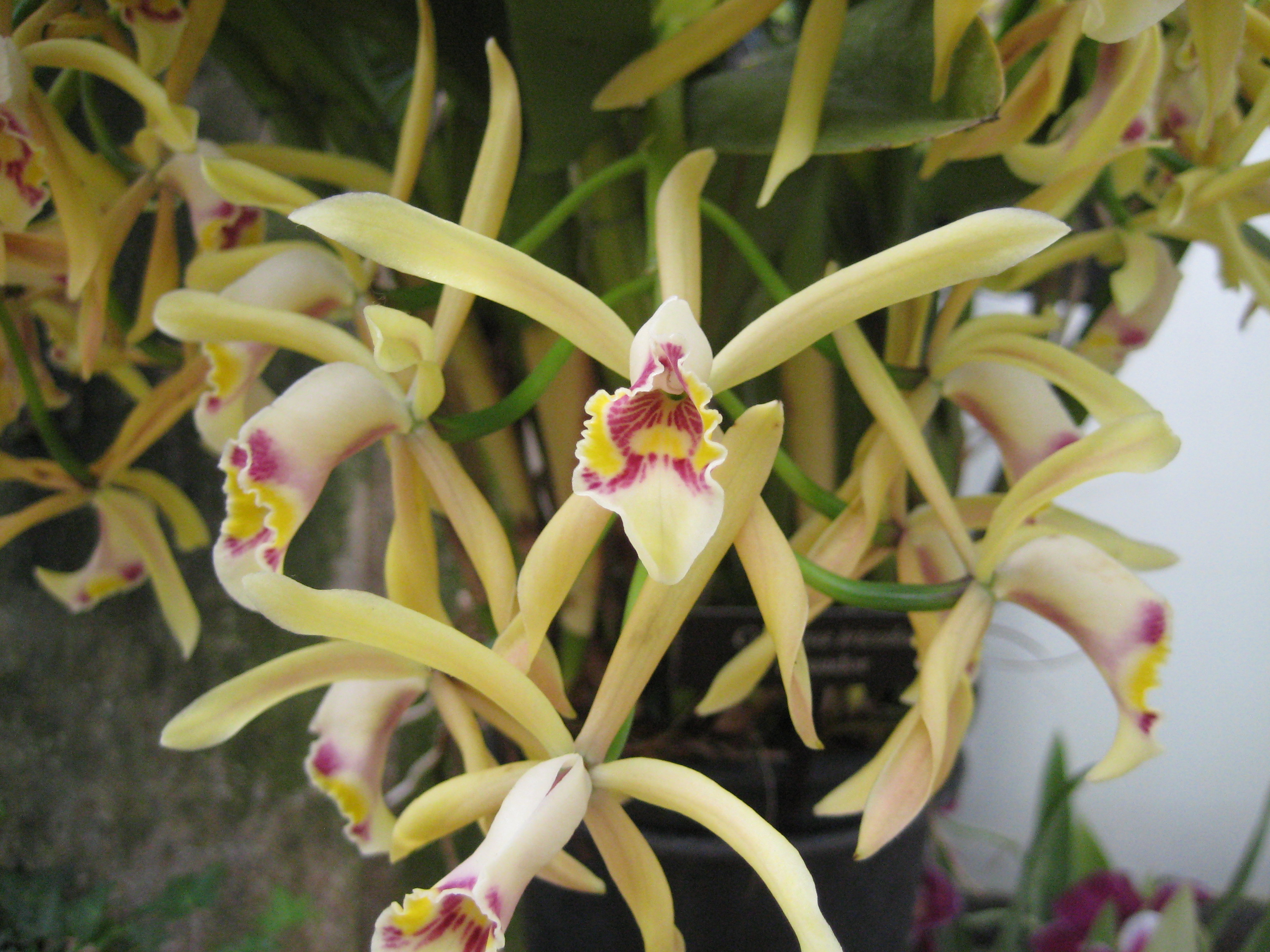

Conservation status
- Vulnerable (IUCN 2.3)

Scientific classification
- Kingdom: Plantae
- Clade: Tracheophytes
- Clade: Angiosperms
- Clade: Monocots
- Order: Asparagales
- Family: Orchidaceae
- Subfamily: Epidendroideae
- Genus: Cattleya
- Subgenus: Cattleya subg. Cattleya
- Section: Cattleya sect. Cattleya
- Species: C. iricolor

Binomial name
- Cattleya iricolor Lindl.

= Cattleya iricolor =

Species of plant

Cattleya iricolor is a species of orchid native to the eastern montane forests of Ecuador and Peru.

== Description ==
Cattleya iricolor is an epiphytic orchid with slightly compressed pseudobulbs with a single terminal leaf each. The leaves are narrow, up to 35 cm long and 3 cm wide. Flowers are very fragrant, creamy white or yellowish, 8 cm across in size, with long and narrow petals and sepals, pointy lip; up to 6 flowers per pseudobulb.

== Distribution and habitat ==
Cattleya iricolor grows in Peru and Ecuador in montane forests of the eastern Andes at elevations of ca.1000 m.

== Conservation ==
The conservation status of Cattleya iricolor is assessed as vulnerable since 1997 by the IUCN.
