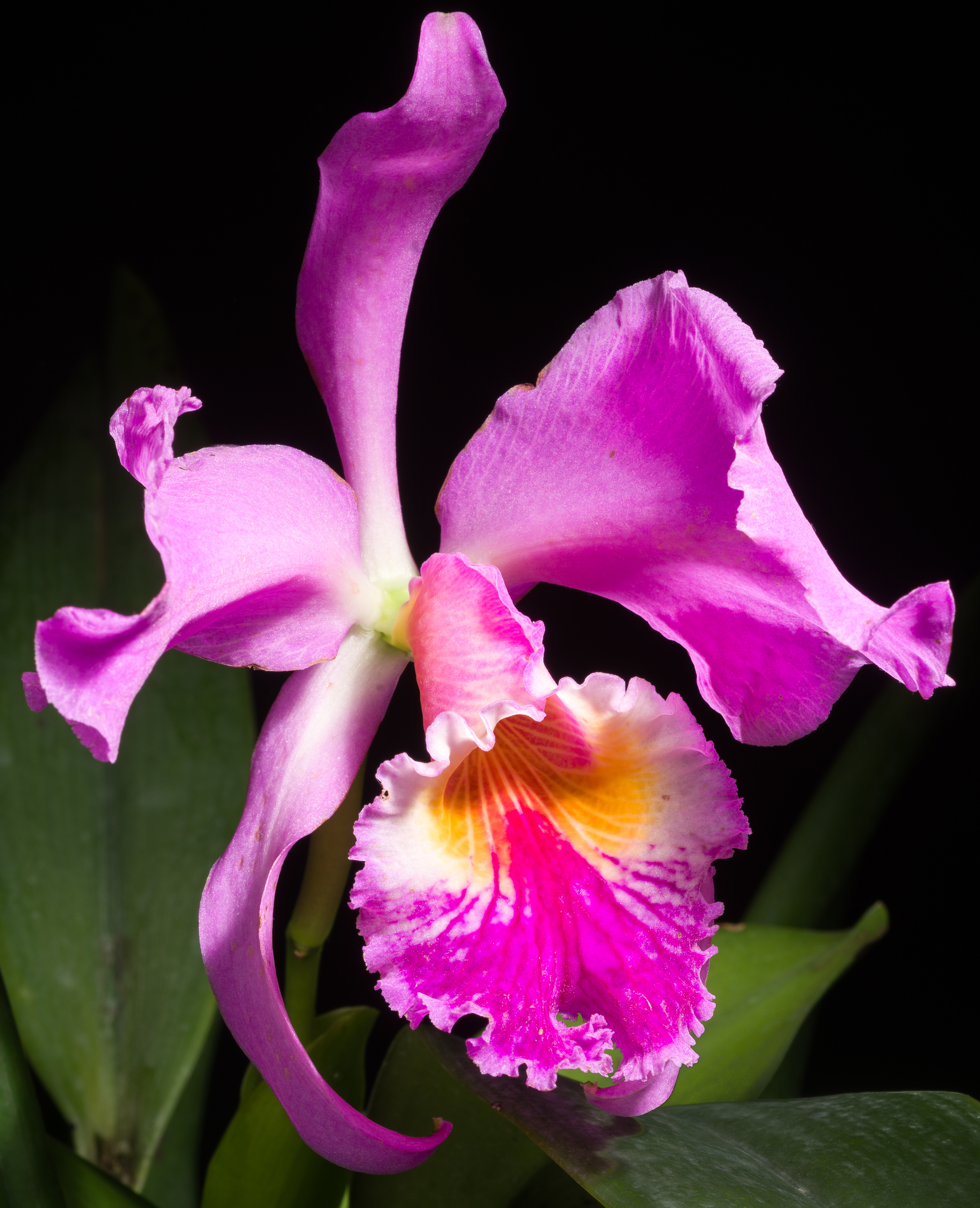

Scientific classification
- Kingdom: Plantae
- Clade: Embryophytes
- Clade: Tracheophytes
- Clade: Spermatophytes
- Clade: Angiosperms
- Clade: Monocots
- Order: Asparagales
- Family: Orchidaceae
- Subfamily: Epidendroideae
- Genus: Cattleya
- Species: C. jenmanii

Binomial name
- Cattleya jenmanii Robert Allen Rolfe, 1906

= Cattleya jenmanii =

Species of flowering plant

Cattleya jenmanii is a species of Cattleya found from Venezuela to Guyana at elevations of 300 – 600 meters
