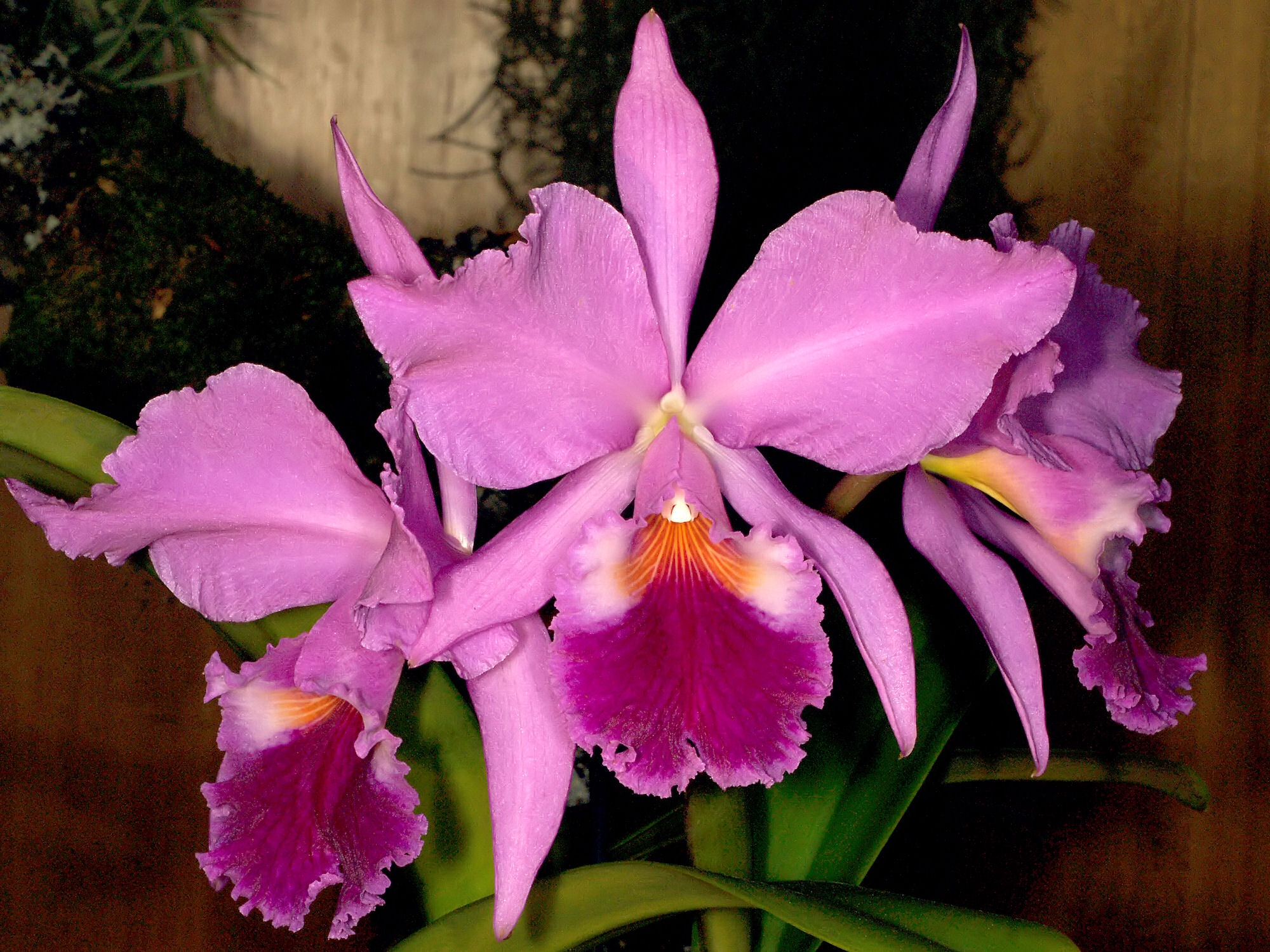
- Cattleya labiata

Scientific classification
- Kingdom: Plantae
- Clade: Tracheophytes
- Clade: Angiosperms
- Clade: Monocots
- Order: Asparagales
- Family: Orchidaceae
- Subfamily: Epidendroideae
- Tribe: Epidendreae
- Subtribe: Laeliinae
- Genus: Cattleya; Lindl.

Type species
- Cattleya labiata Lindl.

Synonyms
- List: Sophronia Lindl.; Sophronitis Lindl.; Maelenia Dumort.; Lophoglotis Raf.; × Sophrocattleya Rolfe; Eunannos Porta & Brade; Hoffmannseggella H.G.Jones; Dungsia Chiron & V.P.Castro; × Hadrocattleya V.P.Castro & Chiron; × Hadrodungsia V.P.Castro & Chiron; Hadrolaelia (Schltr.) Chiron & V.P.Castro; × Microcattleya V.P.Castro & Chiron; Microlaelia (Schltr.) Chiron & V.P.Castro; Cattleyella Van den Berg & M.W.Chase; Schluckebieria Braem; × Brasicattleya Campacci; Brasilaelia Campacci; Chironiella Braem

= Cattleya =

Genus of orchids

Cattleya (/ˈkætliə/) is a genus of orchids from Costa Rica south to Argentina. The genus is abbreviated C in trade journals.

== Description ==
Epiphytic or terrestrial orchids with cylindrical rhizome from which the fleshy noodle-like roots grow. Pseudobulbs can be conical, spindle-shaped or cylindrical; with upright growth; one or two leaves growing from the top of them. The leaves can be oblong, lanceolate or elliptical, somewhat fleshy, with smooth margin. The inflorescence is a terminal raceme with few or several flowers. Flowers have sepals and petals free from each other; the lip or labellum (lowermost petal), usually has a different coloration and shape from the rest of the flower and covers in part the flower column forming a tube. There are four pollinia (bag-like organs that contain pollen). The fruit is a capsule with many small seeds.

== Taxonomy ==
The genus was named in 1824 by John Lindley after horticulturalist William Cattley. Cattley obtained a specimen of then unnamed Cattleya labiata from William Swainson who had discovered the new plant in Pernambuco, Brazil, in 1817. The plant successfully bloomed under the care of Cattley and it became the type specimen from which Lindley described C. labiata.

Currently accepted species and subgeneric division within genus Cattleya are:

- Subgenus Cattleya
  - Section Cattleya
  - Section Crispae
    - Series Cattleyodes
    - Series Hadrolaelia
    - Series Microlaelia
    - Series Parviflorae
    - Series Sophronitis
  - Section Lawrenceanae
- Subgenus Cattleyella
- Subgenus Intermediae
- Subgenus Maximae

=== Subgenus Cattleya ===
==== Section Cattleya ====
Image	Name	Distribution	Elevation (m)
	C. dowiana	Costa Rica, Panama, to Colombia	250 – 1200 meters
	C. gaskelliana	Colombia to Trinidad	700 – 1000 meters
	C. iricolor	Ecuador to Peru	400 – 1220 meters
	C. jenmanii	Venezuela to Guyana	300 – 600 meters
	C. labiata	Brazil	600 – 900 meters
	C. luteola	N. Brazil, Ecuador to Bolivia	100 – 1200 meters
	C. mendelii	NE. Colombia	1300 – 1800 meters
	C. mooreana	Peru	around 990 meters
	C. mossiae	N. Venezuela	900 – 1500 meters
	C. percivaliana	Colombia to W. Venezuela	1300 – 2000 meters
	C. quadricolor	Colombia	600 – 1500 meters
	C. rex	Peru to N Bolivia	around 1350 meters
	C. schroederae	NE. Colombia	.
	C. trianae	Colombia	around 1200 meters
	C. warneri	E. Brazil	400 – 900 meters
	C. warscewiczii	Colombia	500 – 1700 meters

==== Section Crispae ====
===== Series Cattleyodes =====
Image	Name	Distribution	Elevation (m)
	C. crispa	SE. Brazil	800 – 1500 meters
	C. grandis	Brazil - SE. Bahia to N. Espírito Santo	.
	C. lobata	SE. Brazil.	
	C. perrinii	SE. Brazil	700 – 900 meters
	C. purpurata	SE. & S. Brazil	
	C. tenebrosa	Brazil - SE. Bahia to Espírito Santo	.
	C. virens	SE. Brazil	1000 – 1500 meters
	C. xanthina	Brazil - Bahia to Espírito Santo	.

===== Series Hadrolaelia =====
Image	Name	Distribution	Elevation (m)
	C. alaorii	Brazil - Bahia	200 – 600 meters
	C. bicalhoi	Brazil - S. Minas Gerais to Rio de Janeiro	500 – 2000 meters
	C. jongheana	Brazil - Minas Gerais	1300 – 1600 meters
	C. praestans	SE. Brazil	300 – 500 meters
	C. pumila	SE. & S. Brazil	600 – 1300 meters
	C. sincorana	Brazil - Bahia	1100 – 1500 meters

===== Series Microlaelia =====
Image	Name	Distribution	Elevation (m)
	C. lundii	Bolivia to Argentina	740 – 1000 meters

===== Series Parviflorae =====
Image	Name	Distribution	Elevation (m)
	C. alvarenguensis	Brazil - Minas Gerais	around 800 meters
	C. alvaroana	Brazil - Rio de Janeiro	
	C. angereri	Brazil - Minas Gerais	1000–1300 meters
	C. blumenscheinii	Brazil - Minas Gerais	around 1200 meters
	C. bradei	Brazil - Minas Gerais	1100 – 1400 meters
	C. briegeri	Brazil - Minas Gerais	around 1370 meter
	C. campaccii	Brazil	
	C. caulescens	Brazil - Minas Gerais	600 – 1200 meters
	C. cinnabarina	Brazil - S. Minas Gerais, Rio de Janeiro	800 – 1500 meters
	C. colnagoi	Brazil - Minas Gerais	
	C. conceicionensis	Brazil - Minas Gerais	800 – 1200 meters
	C. crispata	Brazil - Minas Gerais	400 – 1200 meters
	C. endsfeldzii	Brazil - Minas Gerais	900 meters
	C. esalqueana	Brazil - Minas Gerais	1100 – 1300 meters
	C. flavasulina	Brazil - Minas Gerais	900 – 1440 meters
	C. fournieri	Brazil - Minas Gerais	1100 – 1800 meters
	C. ghillanyi	Brazil - Minas Gerais	
	C. gloedeniana	Brazil - São Paulo	around 1600 meters
	C. gracilis	Brazil - Minas Gerais: Serra do Cipó	
	C. guanhanensis	Brazil - Minas Gerais	around 1100 meters
	C. harpophylla	Brazil - Minas Gerais to Espírito Santo	500 – 900 meters
	C. hatae	Brazil - Minas Gerais	1000 – 1100 meters
	C. hegeriana	Brazil - Rio de Janeiro	1000 – 1200 meters
	C. hispidula	Brazil - Minas Gerais	around 1200 meters
	C. hoehnei	Brazil - Espírito Santo	around 800 meters
	C. itambana	Brazil - Minas Gerais	1500 to 2200 meters
	C. kautskyana	Brazil - Espírito Santo	600 – 1000 meters
	C. kettieana	Brazil - Minas Gerais	1500 – 2000 meters
	C. kleberi	Brazil - Minas Gerais	around 1100 meters
	C. liliputana	Brazil - Minas Gerais: Serra do Ouro Branco	1200 – 1400 meters
	C. locatellii	Brazil - Minas Gerais	
	C. longipes	SE. Brazil - Serra do Cipó	1300 – 2000 meters
	C. luetzelburgii	Brazil - Bahia	1100 – 1700 meters.
	C. macrobulbosa	Brazil - Espírito Santo	around 1600 meters
	C. marcaliana	Brazil - Bahia	200 – 300 meters
	C. milleri	Brazil - Minas Gerais	800 – 1300 meters
	C. mirandae	Brazil - Minas Gerais	around 1300 meters
	C. munchowiana	Brazil - Espírito Santo	1100 – 1300 meters
	C. neokautskyi	SE. Brazil	600 – 1000 meters.
	C. pabstii	Brazil - Minas Gerais	1200 meters
	C. pendula	Brazil - Minas Gerais	
	C. pfisteri	Brazil - Bahia	around 1300 meters
	C. presidentensis	Brazil - Minas Gerais	1000 – 1300 meters
	C. reginae	Brazil - Minas Gerais	1200 – 2000 meters
	C. rupestris	Brazil - Minas Gerais	
	C. sanguiloba	Brazil – Bahia	
	C. tereticaulis	Brazil - Minas Gerais	
	C. vandenbergii	Brazil - Minas Gerais	
	C. vasconcelosiana	Brazil - Minas Gerais	around 1100 meters
	C. verboonenii	Brazil - Rio de Janeiro	
	C. viridiflora	Brazil - Minas Gerais	

===== Series Sophronitis =====
Image	Name	Distribution	Elevation (m)
	C. acuensis	Brazil - Rio de Janeiro	1800 – 2100 meters
	C. alagoensis	Brazil - Alagoas	300 – 500 meters
	C. cernua	Brazil to NE. Argentina	2 – 100 meters
	C. coccinea	Brazil to NE. Argentina	650 – 1670 meters
	C. dichroma	Brazil - Rio de Janeiro	1200 – 1525 meters
	C. mantiqueirae	SE. Brazil	1200 – 1890 meters
	C. pygmaea	Brazil - Espírito Santo	915 – 1067 meters
	C. wittigiana	Brazil - Espírito Santo	700 – 2000 meters

==== Section Lawrenceanae ====
Image	Name	Distribution	Elevation (m)
	C. lawrenceana	Venezuela, Guyana, N. Brazil	250 – 2400 meters
	C. lueddemanniana	N. Venezuela	0 – 500 meters
	C. wallisii	N. Brazil	

=== Subgenus Cattleyella ===
Image	Name	Distribution	Elevation (m)
	C. araguaiensis	Brazil	395 – 610 meters

=== Subgenus Intermediae ===
Image	Name	Distribution	Elevation (m)
	C. aclandiae	Brazil	100 – 400 meters
	C. amethystoglossa	Brazil	around 600 meters
	C. bicolor	SE. Brazil	
	C. dormaniana	Brazil	600 – 100 meters
	C. elongata	Brazil	900 – 1500 meters
	C. forbesii	Brazil	around 200 meters
	C. granulosa	Brazil	600 – 900 meters
	C. guttata	Brazil	.
	C. harrisoniana	SE. Brazil	
	C. intermedia	SE. & S. Brazil, Paraguay, Uruguay	
	C. kerrii	Brazil	
	C. loddigesii	SE. Brazil to NE. Argentina	.
	C. nobilior	WC. Brazil to Bolivia	170 – 700 meters
	C. porphyroglossa	Brazil	.
	C. schilleriana	Brazil	0 – 800 meters.
	C. schofieldiana	Brazil	around 900 meters
	C. tenuis	NE. Brazil	1000 – 1200 meters.
	C. tigrina	SE. & S. Brazil	0 – 100 meters.
	C. velutina	Brazil	
	C. violacea	lowland Amazon rainforest & Guyana	200 – 700 meters
	C. walkeriana	WC. & SE. Brazil	0 – 2000 meters.

=== Subgenus Maximae ===
Image	Name	Distribution	Elevation (m)
	C. maxima	S Ecuador to N Peru	10 – 1500 meters

== Natural hybrids ==
Currently accepted natural hybrids are:

- Cattleya × adrienne (= Cattleya pumila × Cattleya jongheana) (Brazil)
- Cattleya × albanensis
- Cattleya × amanda
- Cattleya × binotii (= ) (Brazil)
- Cattleya × brasiliensis (= C. bicolor × C. harrisoniana) (Brazil)
- Cattleya × braunae
- Cattleya × britoi (= C. crispata x C. mirandae) (Brazil - Minas Gerais)
- Cattleya × brymeriana (= C. violacea × C. wallisii) (N. Brazil).
- Cattleya × calimaniana (Brazil)
- Cattleya × calimaniorum (NE Brazil)
- Cattleya × carassana (Brazil)
- Cattleya × cattleyioides (Brazil)
- Cattleya × cipoensis (Brazil)
- Cattleya × colnagiana (Brazil).
- Cattleya × cristinae (Brazil).
- Cattleya × cypheri
- Cattleya × dasilvae
- Cattleya × dayana (= C. forbesii × C. guttata) (Brazil).
- Cattleya × deckeri
- Cattleya × delicata
- Cattleya × diamantinensis (= C. pfisteri × C. sincorana) (Brazil).
- Cattleya × dolosa (= C. loddigesii × C. walkeriana) (Brazil).
- Cattleya × dukeana (= C. bicolor × C. guttata) (SE. Brazil).
- Cattleya × duveenii (= C. guttata × C. harrisoniana) (SE. Brazil).
- Cattleya × elegans
- Cattleya × ericoi
- Cattleya × feldmanniana
- Cattleya × fidelensis (Brazil - Rio de Janeiro).
- Cattleya × frankeana
- Cattleya × gaezeriana
- Cattleya × gerhard-santosii
- Cattleya × gottoana
- Cattleya × gransabanensis (= C. jenmanii × C. lawrenceana) (Venezuela).
- Cattleya × gravesiana (= C. lueddemanniana × C. mossiae) (Venezuela).
- Cattleya × hardyana (= C. dowiana var.aurea × C. warscewiczii) (Colombia).
- Cattleya × heitoriana
- Cattleya × hummeliana
- Cattleya × hybrida (= C. guttata × C. loddigesii) (SE. Brazil).
- Cattleya × imperator (= C. granulata × C. labiata) (NE. Brazil).
- Cattleya × intricata (= C. intermedia × C. leopoldii) (S. Brazil).
- Cattleya × irrorata
- Cattleya × isaacii
- Cattleya × isabella (= C. forbesii × C. intermedia) (SE. Brazil).
- Cattleya × itabapoanaensis
- Cattleya × jetibaensis
- Cattleya × joaquiniana (= C. bicolor × C. walkeriana) (Brazil) .
- Cattleya × kautskyi (= C. harrisoniana × C. warneri) (SE. Brazil).
- Cattleya × kerchoveana
- Cattleya × labendziana
- Cattleya × lambari
- Cattleya × lilacina
- Cattleya × lucieniana (= C. forbesii × C. granulosa) (SE. Brazil).
- Cattleya × macguiganii
- Cattleya × measuresii (= C. aclandiae × C. walkeriana) (E. Brazil).
- Cattleya × mesquitae (= C. nobilior × C. walkeriana) (Brazil).
- Cattleya × mingaensis
- Cattleya × mixta (= C. guttata × C. schofieldiana) (Brazil).
- Cattleya × moduloi (C. schofieldiana × C. warneri) (Brazil).
- Cattleya × mucugensis
- Cattleya × neocalimaniana
- Cattleya × neocalimaniorum
- Cattleya × neoreginae
- Cattleya × nesyana
- Cattleya × occhioniana
- Cattleya × odiloniana
- Cattleya × patrocinii (= C. guttata × C. warneriana) (SE. Brazil).
- Cattleya × picturata (= C. guttata × C. intermedia) (SE. Brazil).
- Cattleya × pittiana
- Cattleya × porphyritis
- Cattleya × porphyrophlebia
- Cattleya × raganii
- Cattleya × resplendens (= C. granulosa × C. schilleriana) (NE. Brazil)
- Cattleya × rigbyana
- Cattleya × ruschii
- Cattleya × sancheziana
- Cattleya × schroederiana
- Cattleya × schunkiana
- Cattleya × schunkii
- Cattleya × scita (= C. intermedia × C. tigrina) (S. Brazil).
- Cattleya × sgarbii
- Cattleya × sororia
- Cattleya × tenuata (= C. elongata × C. tenuis) (Brazil) .
- Cattleya × varelae
- Cattleya × venosa (= C. forbesii × C. harrisoniana) (Brazil).
- Cattleya × verelii
- Cattleya × victoria-regina ( C. guttata × C. labiata) (NE. Brazil).
- Cattleya × victoriacarolinae
- Cattleya × wetmorei
- Cattleya × whitei
- Cattleya × wilsoniana (= C. bicolor × C. intermedia). (Brazil).
- Cattleya × wyattiana (= C. crispa × C. lobata). (Brazil).
- Cattleya × zaslawskii (= C. harpophylla × C. praestans). (Brazil).
- Cattleya × zayrae (= C. amethystoglossa × C. elongata). (Bahia, Brazil)

== Nothogenera ==
Hybrids of Cattleya and other genera are placed in the following nothogenera:

- × Brassocattleya = Brassavola × Cattleya
- × Brassolaeliocattleya = Brassavola × Cattleya × Laelia
- × Cattleytonia = Cattleya × Broughtonia
- × Laeliocattleya = Cattleya × Laelia
- × Rhyncholaeliocattleya = Rhyncholaelia × Cattleya

== Cultivation ==
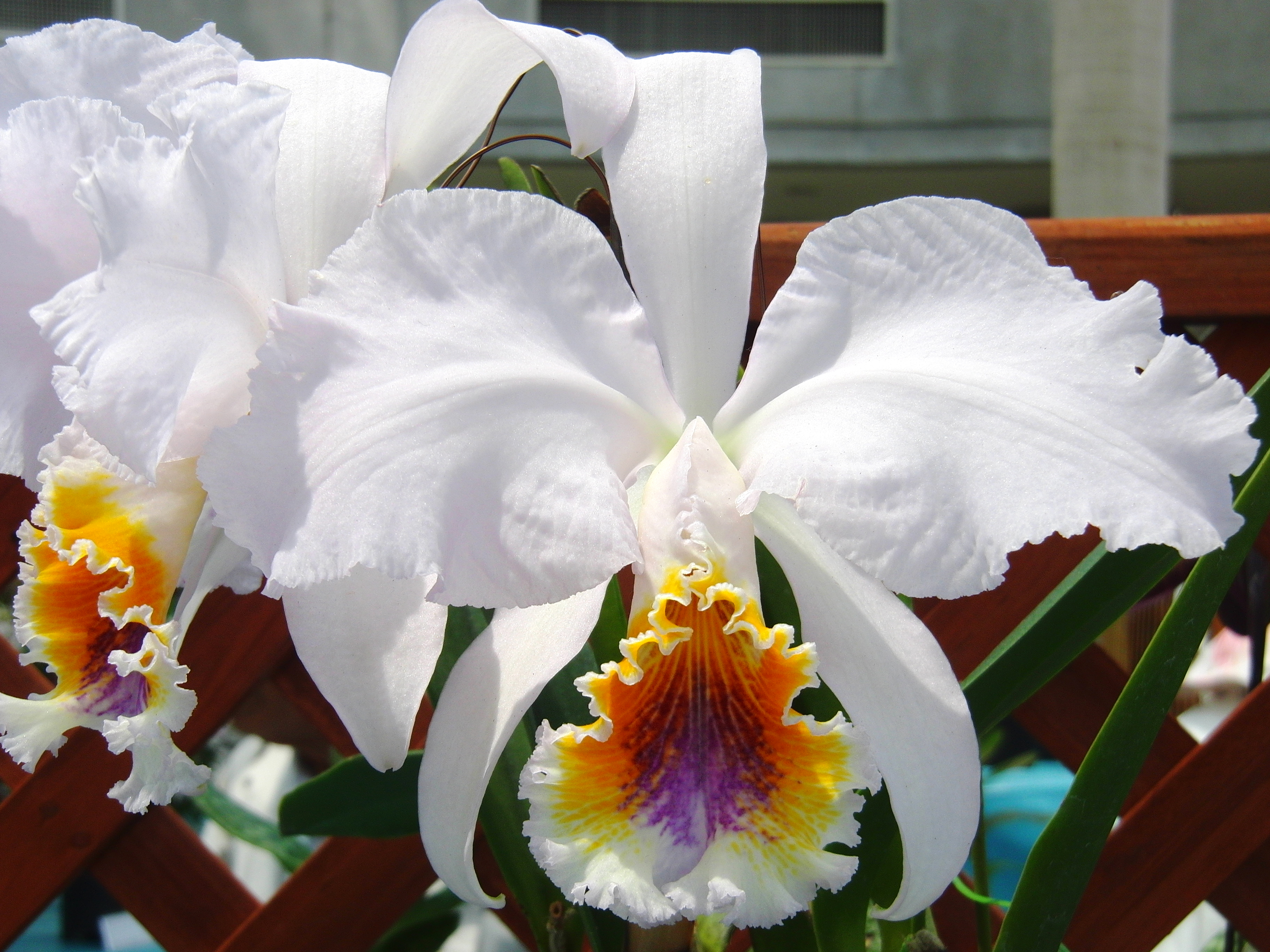
Cattleya mossiae fo. coerulea

- Light

Cattleyas need light, but not direct sunlight; in case of intense sunlight, shade must be provided.

- Temperature

Day temperatures must be between 25–30 °C (77–86 °F) and night temperatures not lower than 10–12 °C (50–53.6 °F).

- Humidity

Must be between 40–70% with good ventilation; however plants must not be exposed to air currents.

- Watering

Water only if substrate is dry. It can be done once a week, but it all depends on the environmental conditions and the season.

- Fertilizing

Cattleyas can survive without fertilizing. However, it is advisable to use nitrogen-based fertilizers without urea; fertilizers must be applied during the growth season. To avoid salt accumulation in the substrate, water thoroughly between fertilizer applications.
