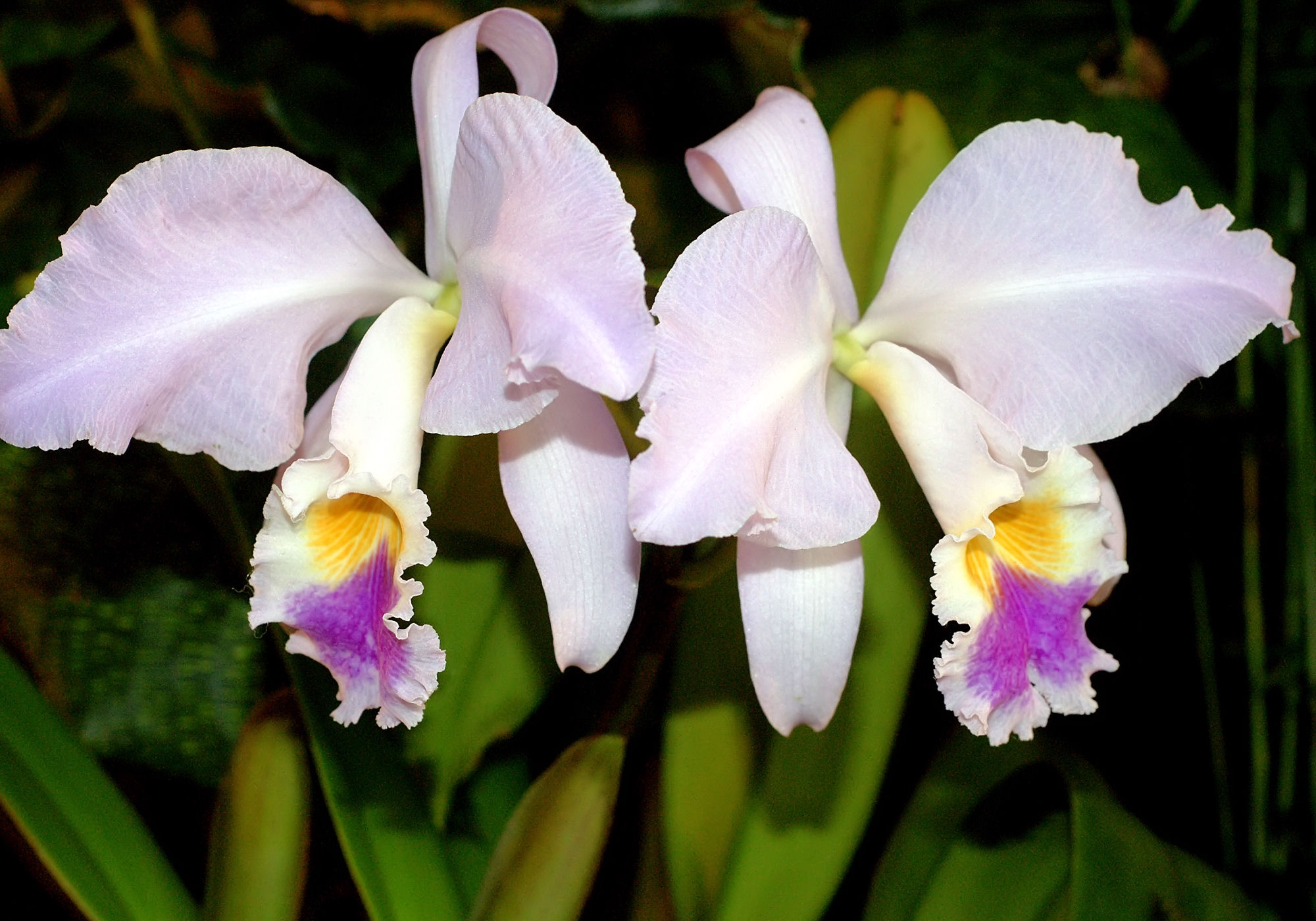
- Cattleya mendelii flowers

Scientific classification
- Kingdom: Plantae
- Clade: Tracheophytes
- Clade: Angiosperms
- Clade: Monocots
- Order: Asparagales
- Family: Orchidaceae
- Subfamily: Epidendroideae
- Genus: Cattleya
- Species: C. mendelii

Binomial name
- Cattleya mendelii Dombrain

Synonyms
- Cattleya labiata var. bella Rchb.f.; Cattleya mendelii var. bella (Rchb.f.) B.S.Williams & T.Moore; Cattleya mendelii var. grandiflora B.S.Williams & T.Moore; Cattleya mendelii f. morganiae (B.S.Williams & T.Moore) M.Wolff & O.Gruss; Cattleya mendelii var. morganiae (B.S.Williams & T.Moore) Braem; Cattleya morganiae B.S.Williams & T.Moore

= Cattleya mendelii =

Species of orchid

Cattleya mendelii is a species in the orchid genus Cattleya found in northeastern Colombia. It is typically found growing at elevations of 1,300 to 1,800 m (4,300 to 5,900 ft).
