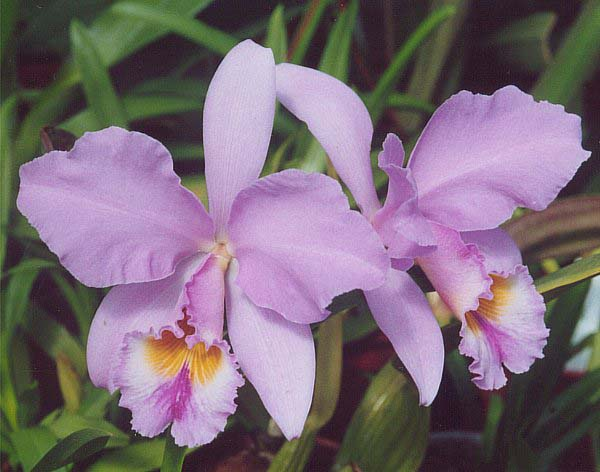

Scientific classification
- Kingdom: Plantae
- Clade: Tracheophytes
- Clade: Angiosperms
- Clade: Monocots
- Order: Asparagales
- Family: Orchidaceae
- Subfamily: Epidendroideae
- Genus: Cattleya
- Subgenus: Cattleya subg. Cattleya
- Section: Cattleya sect. Cattleya
- Species: C. gaskelliana

Binomial name
- Cattleya gaskelliana (N.E.Br.) B.S.Williams

Synonyms
- Cattleya labiata var. gaskelliana N.E.Br.

= Cattleya gaskelliana =

Species of orchid

Cattleya gaskelliana is a labiate Cattleya species of orchid. The diploid chromosome number of C. gaskelliana has been determined as 2n = 40.

This species is endangered due to its habitat being wiped out by things like urbanization and mining. It also is overly extracted for commercial use. Because of its low breeding success (5% of seeds being germinated and even less making it to adulthood), it is important to find ways to help conserve this plant. One way is by studying ways to improve vitro propagation.
