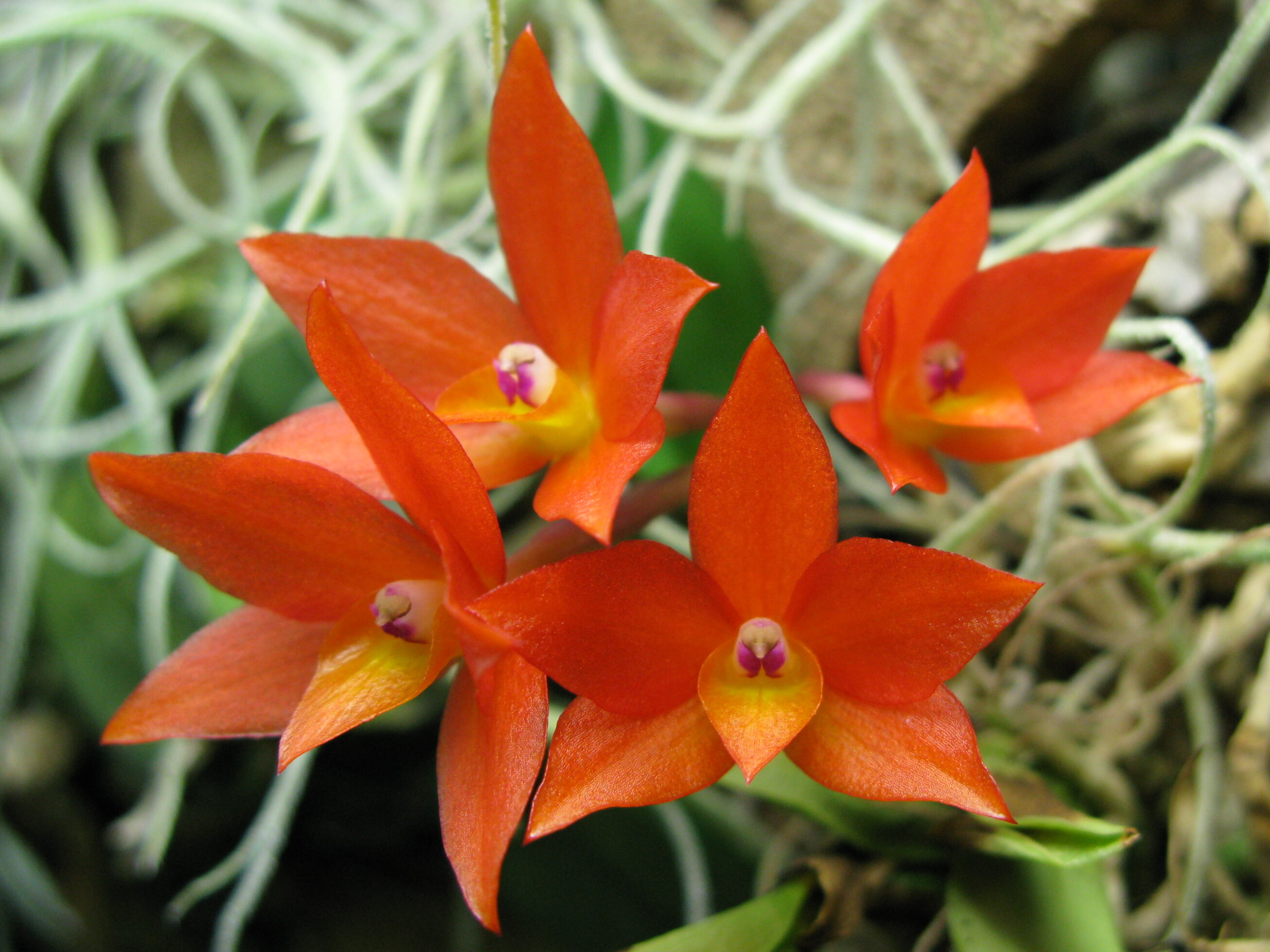
- Flower of Cattleya cernua

Scientific classification
- Kingdom: Plantae
- Clade: Tracheophytes
- Clade: Angiosperms
- Clade: Monocots
- Order: Asparagales
- Family: Orchidaceae
- Subfamily: Epidendroideae
- Genus: Cattleya
- Subgenus: Cattleya subg. Cattleya
- Section: Cattleya sect. Crispae
- Species: C. cernua

Binomial name
- Cattleya cernua (Lindl.) Van den Berg

Synonyms
- Cattleya cernua Beer; Cattleya pterocarpa Beer; Epidendrum humile Vell.; Sophronia cernua Lindl.; Sophronia modesta Lindl.; Sophronia pterocarpa (Lindl. & Paxton) Kuntze; Sophronitis cernua (Lindl.) Lindl.; Sophronitis cernua var. alagoensis Gomes Ferreira; Sophronitis cernua var. albiflora Cogn.; Sophronitis cernua var. endsfeldzii Pabst; Sophronitis hoffmannseggii Rchb. ex Hoffmanns.; Sophronitis isopetala Hoffmanns.; Sophronitis modesta Lindl.; Sophronitis nutans Hoffmanns.; Sophronitis pterocarpa Lindl. & Paxton

= Cattleya cernua =

Nodding sophronitis

Species of orchid

Cattleya cernua, commonly known as the nodding sophronitis, is a species of orchid occurring from Brazil to northeastern Argentina. It was the type species of the genus Sophronitis until the genus was made synonymous with Cattleya. Twenty plants of C. cernua have received a total of 22 AOS awards. The described flowers range from 1.9 cm to 3.2 cm horizontal spread and from 2.0 cm to 3.0 cm vertical spread.

In nature, Cattleya cernua is pollinated by hummingbirds drawn to the blooms' warm colors. The orchid's cryptic pollinia (masses of pollen which adhere together) provide an interesting adaptation to hummingbird pollination. C. cernua is pollinated when sticky pollinia are deposited on a bird's beak. While most orchid pollinia are yellow, hummingbird pollinated orchids' pollinia are darker colored. A bright yellow pollen would produce a sharp visual contrast against the color of the beak, and the bird would be stimulated to clean his beak. Such a behavior which would be a reproductive disaster for the orchid. Therefore, to avoid detection, half of all hummingbird-pollinated orchids evolved dark pollinia−blue, gray or brown−which most closely approaches the colors which predominate in the birds' beaks and blend in more successfully.

== Species description ==
- Usually blooms with 2-4 bright red-orange blooms, 1" to 1 1/4" [2.2 to 2.7 cm] in size
- Monofoliate pseudobulbs with appx 1" leaves
- flowers in Spring in nature, but can bloom year-round in cultivation
- generally warm growing orchid, temps range from 50-110F in natural environment
- can be found growing epiphytically or occasionally lithophytically
- chromosome count: 2n= 40

In cultivation, this species grows best when mounted, in warm and bright conditions.

== Subspecies and varieties ==
- Cattleya cernua var. aurea: bright yellow flowers
- Cattleya cernua var. mineira: has an average of 10 to 14 brilliant red, smaller flowers and silver-grey leaves with violet midribs and margins.
- Cattleya cernua subsp. cernua: has single rows of pseudobulbs, spoon-shaped leaves, 2 to 5 flowers per inflorescence of pale orange colour with a yellow lip base and two lilac column wings. It grows along the coast (littoral) and sometimes is called var. littoreana.
- Cattleya cernua var. lowii: a rare variety with lemon yellow flowers.
- Cattleya cernua subsp. mineira' var. endsfeldzii: an "albino" form that has very pale yellow flowers.
