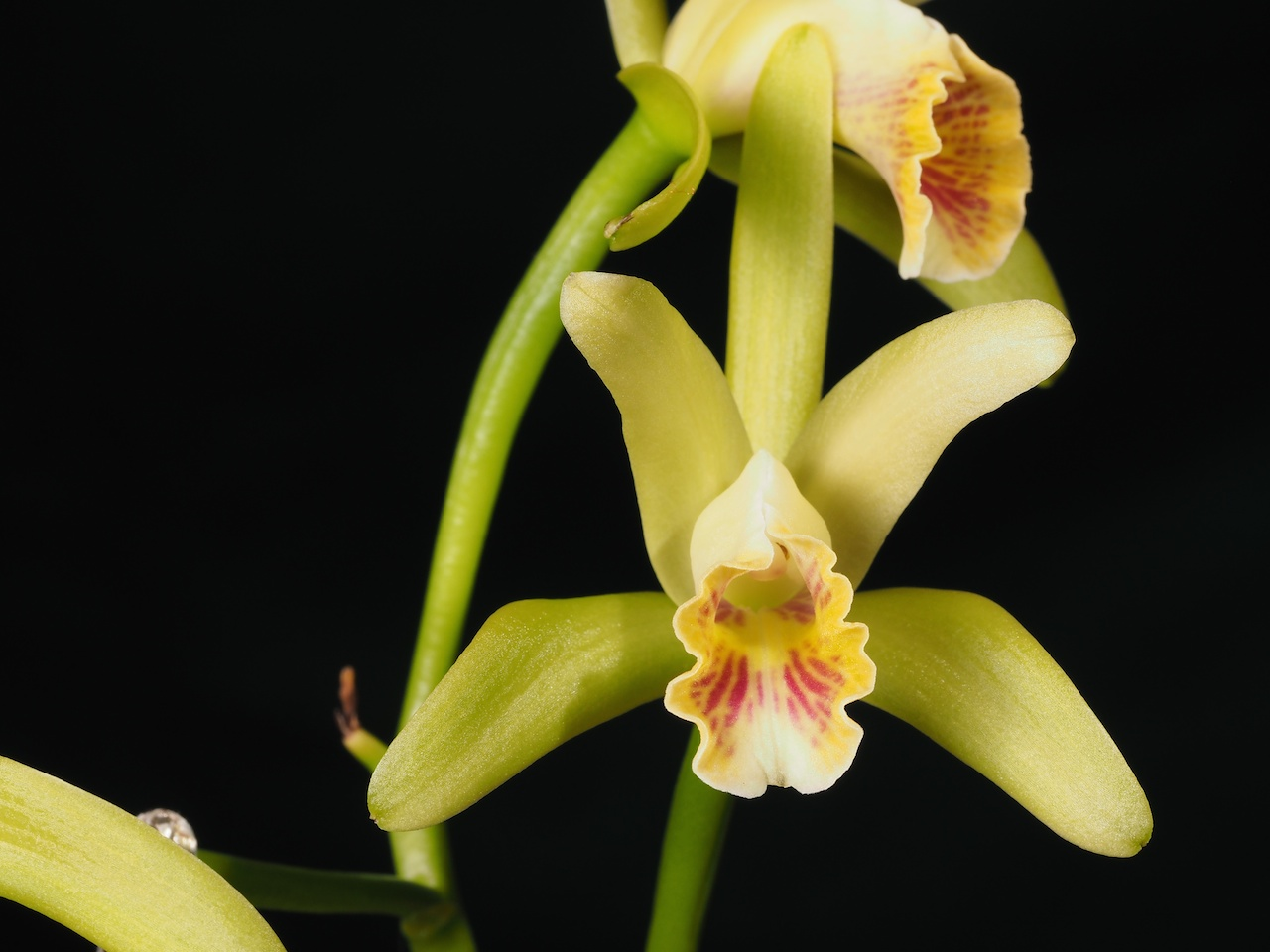

Conservation status
- Endangered (IUCN 2.3)

Scientific classification
- Kingdom: Plantae
- Clade: Tracheophytes
- Clade: Angiosperms
- Clade: Monocots
- Order: Asparagales
- Family: Orchidaceae
- Subfamily: Epidendroideae
- Genus: Cattleya
- Subgenus: Cattleya subg. Cattleya
- Section: Cattleya sect. Cattleya
- Species: C. mooreana

Binomial name
- Cattleya mooreana Withner, Allison & Guénard

= Cattleya mooreana =

Species of plant

Cattleya mooreana is a species of orchid native to Peru. It is considered an endangered species since 1997 by the IUCN.
