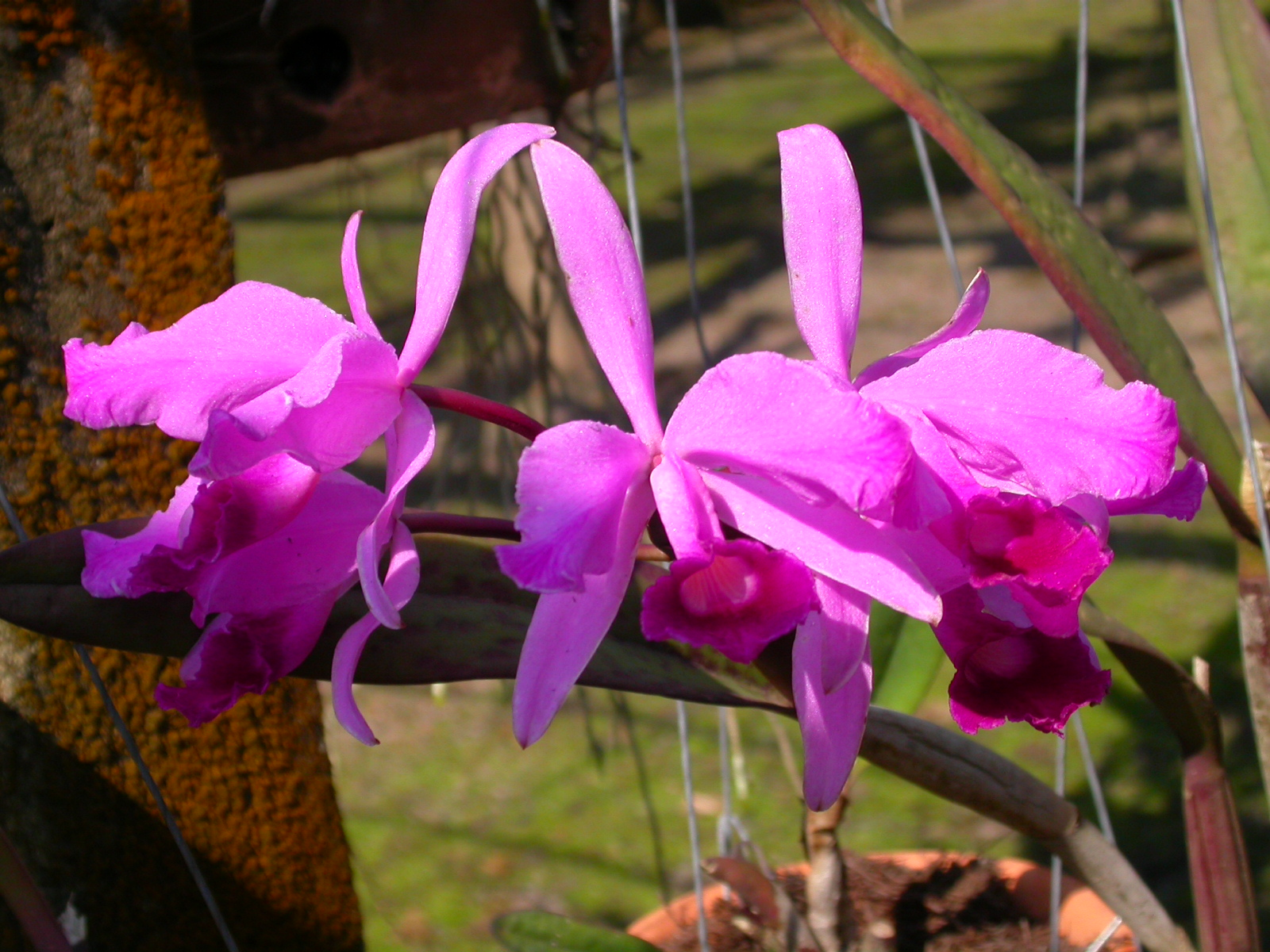

Scientific classification
- Kingdom: Plantae
- Clade: Tracheophytes
- Clade: Angiosperms
- Clade: Monocots
- Order: Asparagales
- Family: Orchidaceae
- Subfamily: Epidendroideae
- Genus: Cattleya
- Subgenus: Cattleya subg. Cattleya
- Section: Cattleya sect. Lawrenceanae
- Species: C. lawrenceana

Binomial name
- Cattleya lawrenceana Rchb.f.

Synonyms
- Cattleya lawrenceana var. concolor Rchb.f.; Cattleya lawrenceana var. rosea-superba H.J. Veitch

= Cattleya lawrenceana =

Species of orchid

Cattleya lawrenceana is a species of labiate Cattleya orchid.
