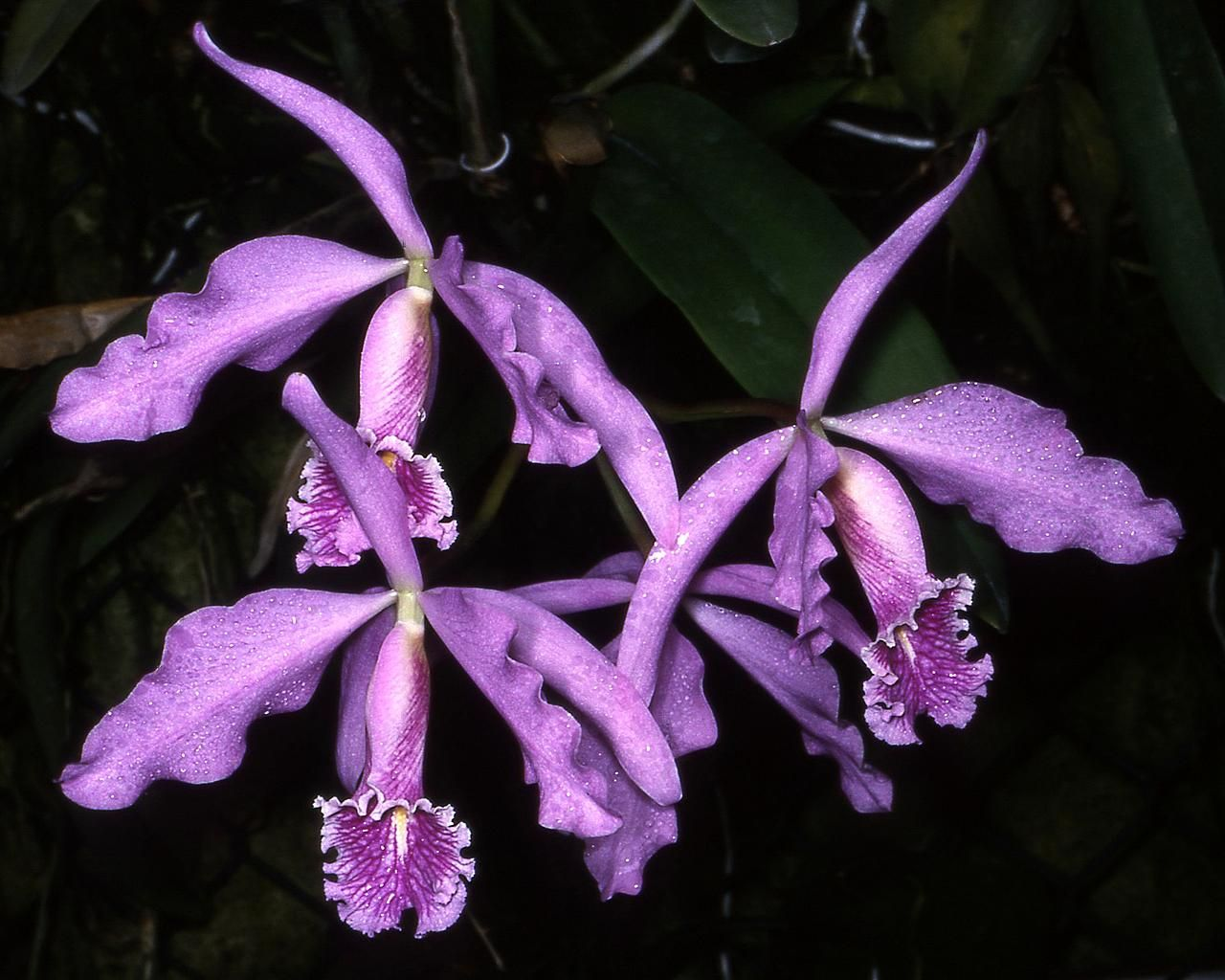

Scientific classification
- Kingdom: Plantae
- Clade: Tracheophytes
- Clade: Angiosperms
- Clade: Monocots
- Order: Asparagales
- Family: Orchidaceae
- Subfamily: Epidendroideae
- Genus: Cattleya
- Subgenus: Cattleya subg. Maximae (Withner) Van den Berg
- Species: C. maxima

Binomial name
- Cattleya maxima Lindl.

Synonyms
- Cattleya malouana Linden; Cattleya malouana L. Linden & Rodigas; Cattleya maxima var. aphlebia Rchb.f.; Cattleya maxima f. aphlebia (Rchb.f.) Roeth; Cattleya maxima var. backhousii Rchb.f.; Cattleya maxima var. hrubyana L.Linden & Rodigas; Cattleya maxima var. marchettiana B.S.Williams; Epidendrum maximum (Lindl.) Rchb.f.

= Cattleya maxima =

Species of plant

Cattleya maxima is a species of orchid in subfamily Epidendroideae found from Ecuador to Peru.

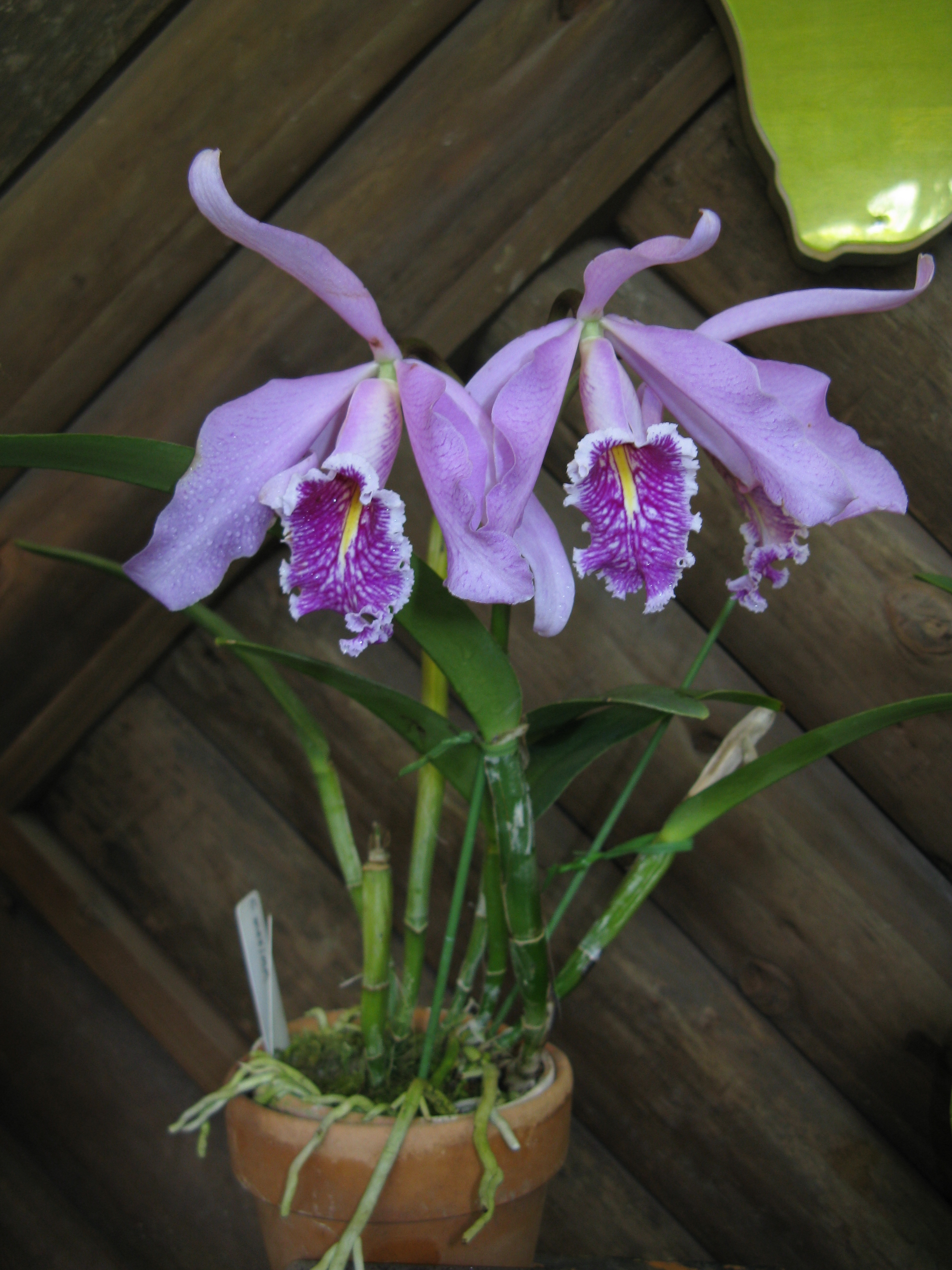
Habit.

== Description ==
Epiphytic herb with club-shaped pseudobulbs, up to 39 cm or taller with one leaf at the top (total height of pseudobulb and leaf about 61 cm). Leaf oblong or broadly oblong, rounded at apex, light green, up to 35 cm long and up to 6 cm wide, thick and fleshy. Inflorescence stem up to 30 cm long, with 3–6 (upland variety) or 12–15 (lowland variety) flowers. Flowers 12–15 cm wide, with lilac or pale rose sepals and petals, except the lip or labellum, which has dark purple veins and a yellow area in the middle. Dorsal sepal narrowly elliptic; lateral sepals elliptic lanceolate; petals elliptic with wavy margin; lip folded forming a tube, with the front margin curly and wavy. Column slender and arched.

== Distribution and habitat ==
Cattleya maxima occurs as an epiphyte on trees in dry forests from 100 to 1800 m of elevation, from Ecuador to Peru. The upland variety can be found growing on rocky slopes.
