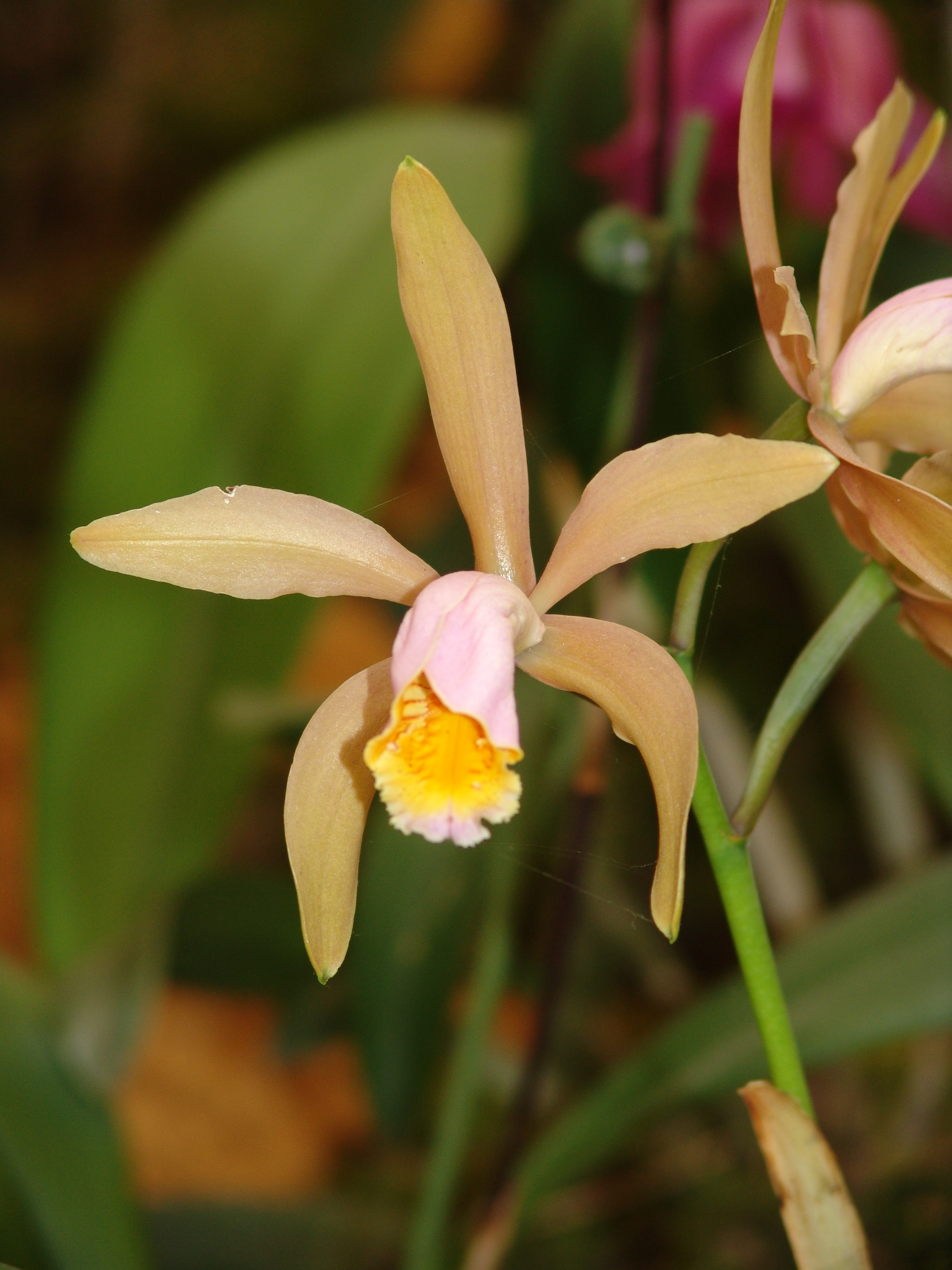

Scientific classification
- Kingdom: Plantae
- Clade: Tracheophytes
- Clade: Angiosperms
- Clade: Monocots
- Order: Asparagales
- Family: Orchidaceae
- Subfamily: Epidendroideae
- Genus: Cattleya
- Subgenus: Cattleya subg. Intermediae
- Species: C. forbesii

Binomial name
- Cattleya forbesii Lindl.

Synonyms
- Epidendrum pauper Vell.; Maelenia paradoxa Dumort.; Cattleya vestalis Hoffmanns.; Cattleya fulva Beer; Cattleya isopetala Beer; Epidendrum forbesii (Lindl.) Rchb.f.; Cattleya forbesii var. viridiflora Horta; Cattleya pauper (Vell.) Stellfeld

= Cattleya forbesii =

Species of orchid

Cattleya forbesii, or Forbes' cattleya, is a species of orchid. The diploid chromosome number of C. forbesii has been determined as 2n = 54–60.
