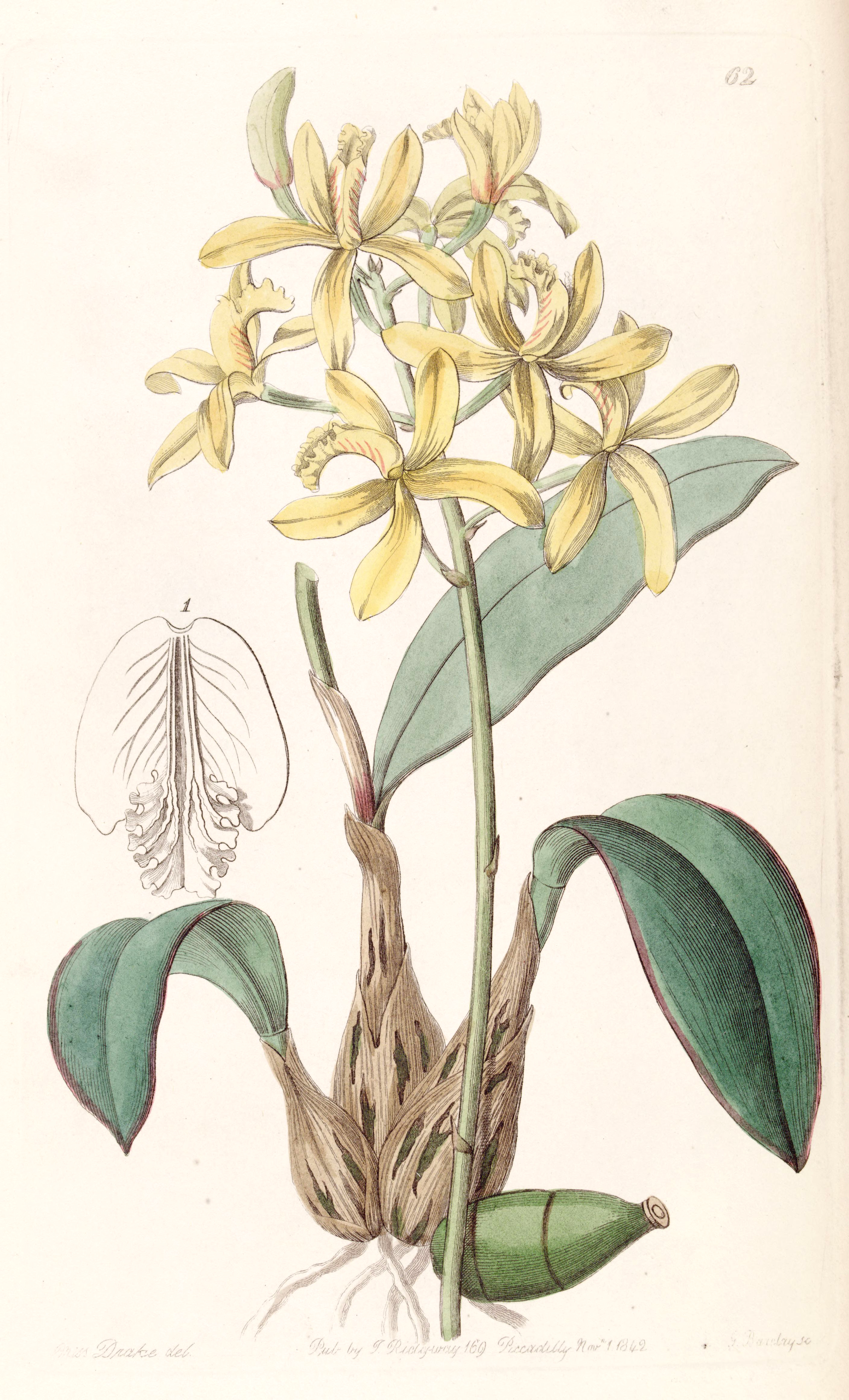
- Illustration of Cattleya crispata

Scientific classification
- Kingdom: Plantae
- Clade: Tracheophytes
- Clade: Angiosperms
- Clade: Monocots
- Order: Asparagales
- Family: Orchidaceae
- Subfamily: Epidendroideae
- Genus: Cattleya
- Subgenus: Cattleya subg. Cattleya
- Section: Cattleya sect. Crispae
- Species: C. crispata

Binomial name
- Cattleya crispata (Thunb.) Van den Berg

Synonyms
- Cymbidium crispatum Thunb.; Laelia flava Lindl.; Laelia rupestris Lindl.; Amalia flava (Lindl.) Heynh.; Amalia fulva (Lindl.) Heynh.; Laelia fulva Lindl. ex Heynh.; Cattleya flava (Lindl.) Beer; Bletia flava (Lindl.) Rchb.f.; Bletia rupestris (Lindl.) Rchb.f.; Bletia crispilabia (A.Rich. ex R.Warner) Rchb.f.; Laelia crispilabia A.Rich. ex R.Warner; Laelia lawrenceana R.Warner; Laelia cinnabarina var. crispilabia (A.Rich. ex R.Warner) H.J.Veitch; Laelia flava var. micrantha W.Zimm.; Hoffmannseggella flava (Lindl.) H.G.Jones; Hoffmannseggella crispilabia (A.Rich. ex R.Warner) H.G.Jones; Laelia crispata (Thunb.) Garay; Hoffmannseggella crispata (Thunb.) H.G.Jones; Laelia caetensis Pabst; Laelia gardneri Pabst ex Zappi; Laelia mantiqueirae Pabst ex Zappi; Sophronitis caetensis (Pabst) Van den Berg & M.W.Chase; Sophronitis crispata (Thunb.) Van den Berg & M.W.Chase; Sophronitis mirandae Van den Berg & M.W.Chase; Hoffmannseggella caetensis (Pabst) V.P.Castro & Chiron; Hoffmannseggella rupestris (Lindl.) V.P.Castro & Chiron

= Cattleya crispata =

Yellow laelia

Species of orchid

Cattleya crispata, commonly known by the synonym Laelia flava, is a species of orchid endemic to Minas Gerais, Brazil. For registration purposes, the Royal Horticultural Society calls this species Cattleya crispata.
