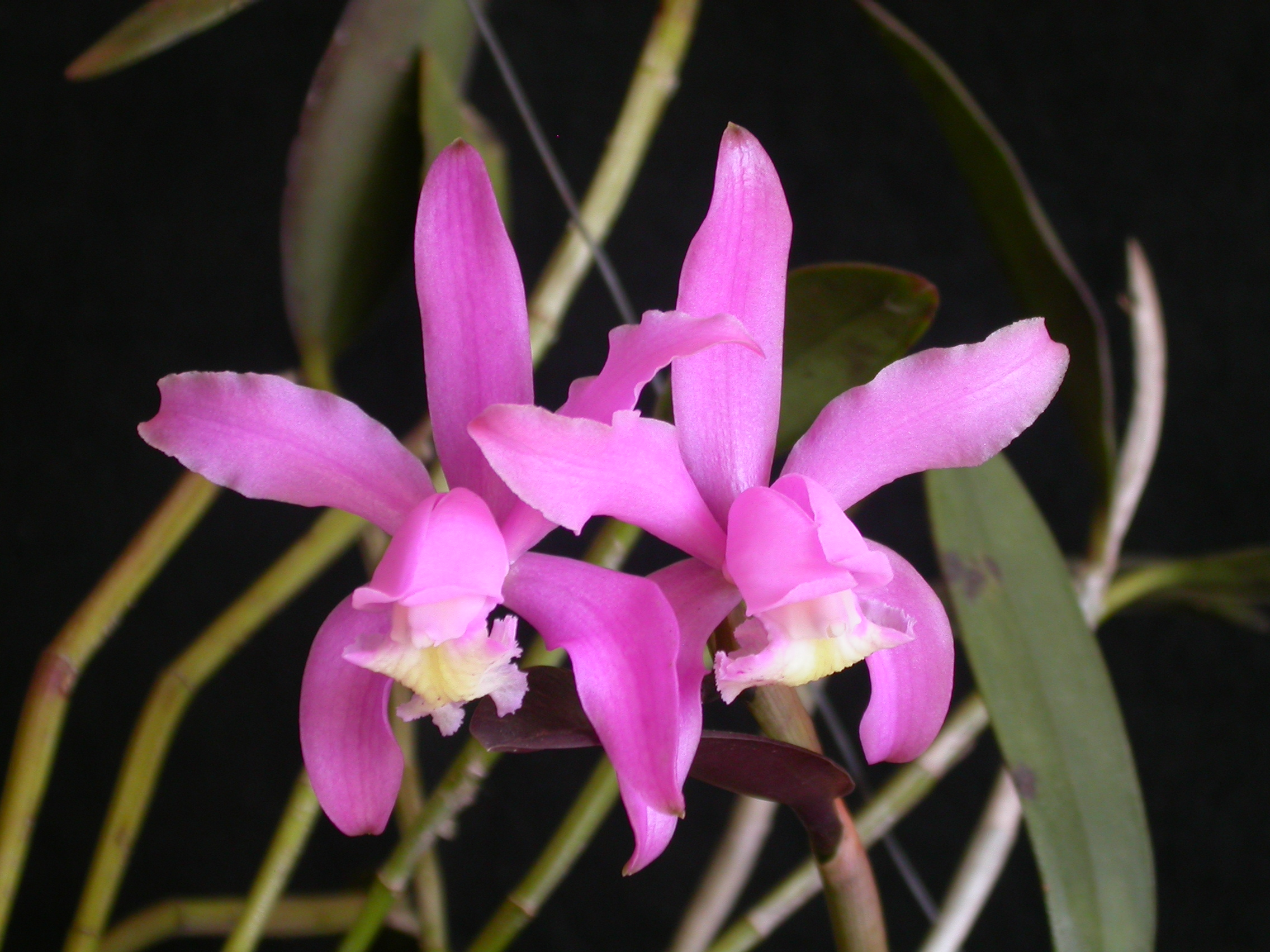

Scientific classification
- Kingdom: Plantae
- Clade: Tracheophytes
- Clade: Angiosperms
- Clade: Monocots
- Order: Asparagales
- Family: Orchidaceae
- Subfamily: Epidendroideae
- Genus: Cattleya
- Subgenus: Cattleya subg. Intermediae
- Species: C. kerrii

Binomial name
- Cattleya kerrii Brieger & Bicalho

= Cattleya kerrii =

Species of orchid

Cattleya kerrii ("Kerr's Cattleya") is a species of orchid.
