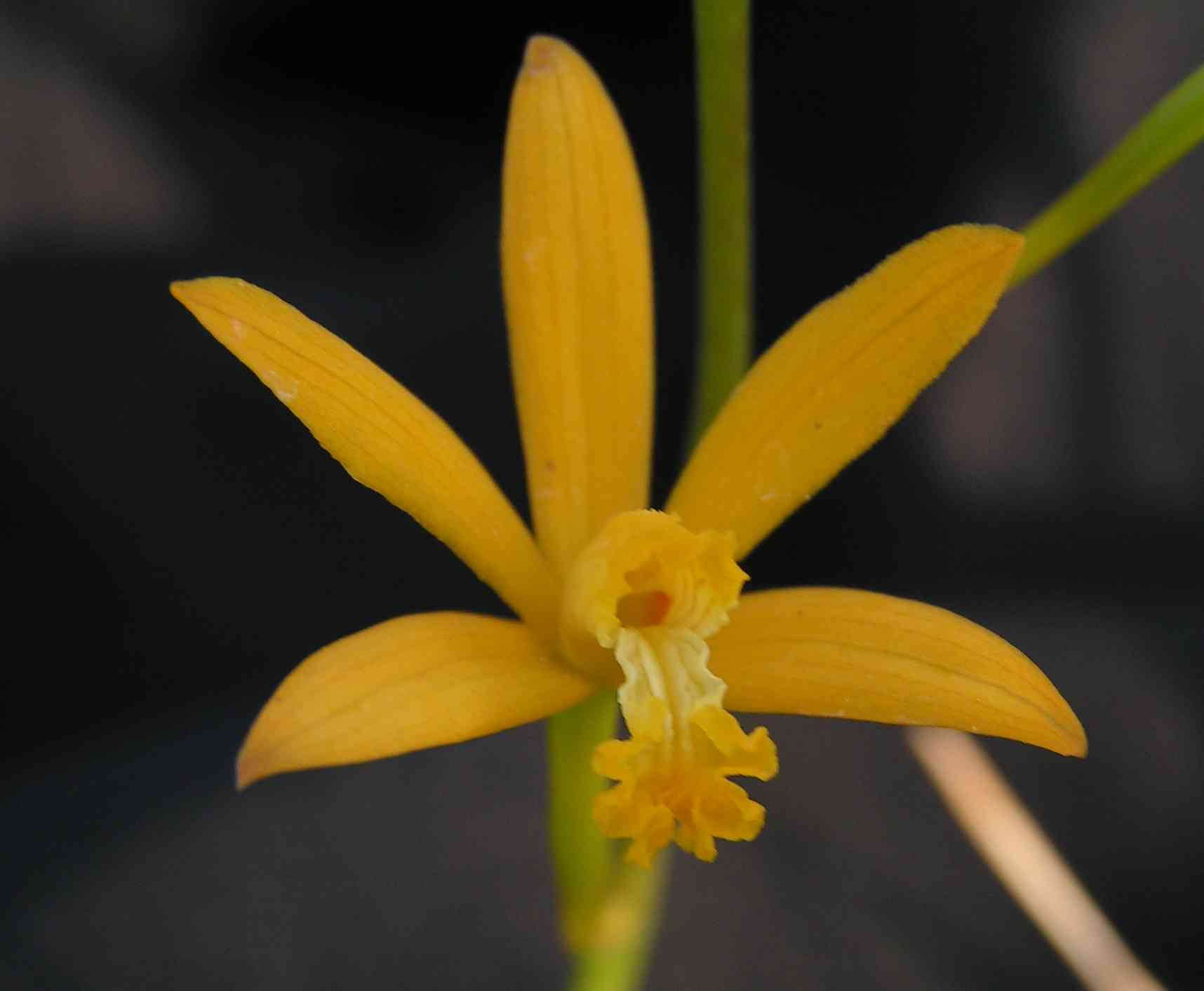
- Cattleya hoehnei flower

Scientific classification
- Kingdom: Plantae
- Clade: Tracheophytes
- Clade: Angiosperms
- Clade: Monocots
- Order: Asparagales
- Family: Orchidaceae
- Subfamily: Epidendroideae
- Genus: Cattleya
- Subgenus: Cattleya subg. Cattleya
- Section: Cattleya sect. Crispae
- Species: C. hoehnei

Binomial name
- Cattleya hoehnei Van den Berg

Synonyms
- Laelia mixta Hoehne; Hoffmannseggella mixta (Hoehne) V.P.Castro & Chiron; Sophronitis mixta Hoehne

= Cattleya hoehnei =

Species of orchid

Cattleya hoehnei, commonly known by the synonym Laelia mixta, is a species of orchid endemic to Espírito Santo, Brazil. It has been renamed as Cattleya hoehnei Van den Berg (2008).
