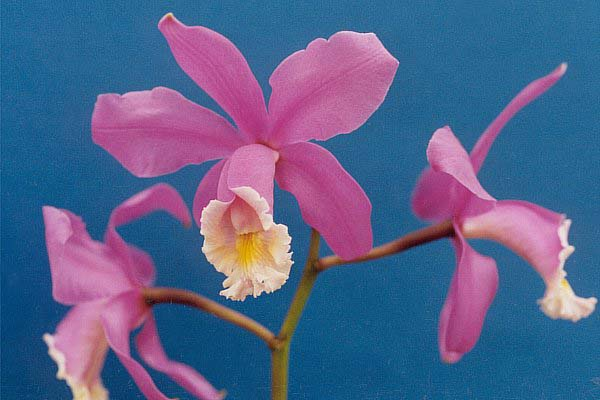

Scientific classification
- Kingdom: Plantae
- Clade: Tracheophytes
- Clade: Angiosperms
- Clade: Monocots
- Order: Asparagales
- Family: Orchidaceae
- Subfamily: Epidendroideae
- Genus: Cattleya
- Subgenus: Cattleya subg. Intermediae
- Species: C. harrisoniana

Binomial name
- Cattleya harrisoniana Bateman ex Lindl.

Synonyms
- Cattleya harrisoniae Paxton; Cattleya concolor Drapiez; Cattleya harrisonii P.N.Don; Cattleya papeiansiana C.Morren; Cattleya harrisoniana var. alba Beer; Cattleya loddigesii var. harrisoniae (Paxton) A.H.Kent; Cattleya brownii Rolfe

= Cattleya harrisoniana =

Species of orchid

Cattleya harrisoniana ("Harrison's Cattley's orchid") is a bifoliate Cattleya species of orchid. The diploid chromosome number of C. harrisoniana has been determined as 2n = 40. The haploid chromosome number of C. harrisoniana has been determined as n = 20.
