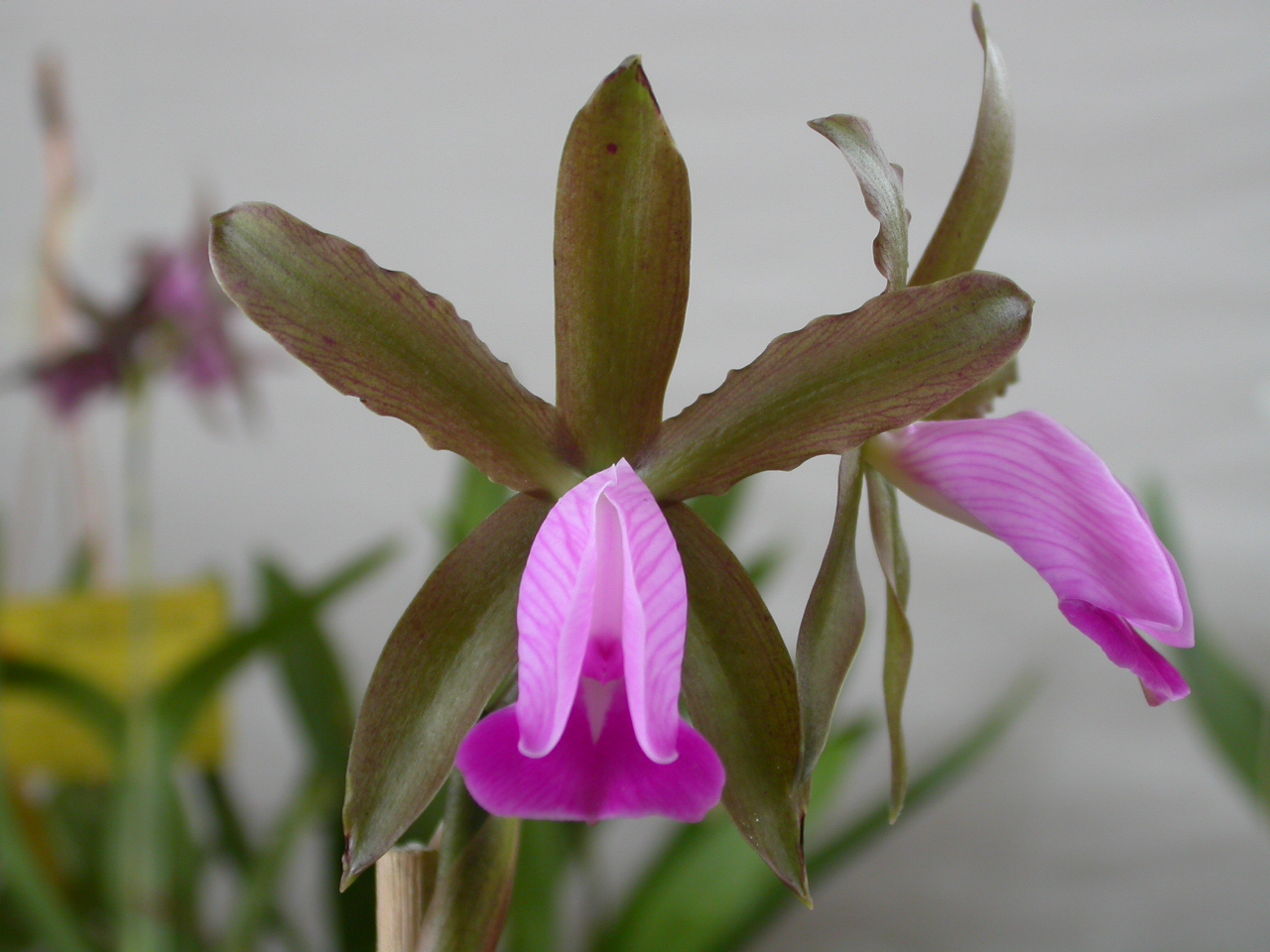

Scientific classification
- Kingdom: Plantae
- Clade: Tracheophytes
- Clade: Angiosperms
- Clade: Monocots
- Order: Asparagales
- Family: Orchidaceae
- Subfamily: Epidendroideae
- Genus: Cattleya
- Subgenus: Cattleya subg. Intermediae
- Species: C. dormaniana

Binomial name
- Cattleya dormaniana (Rchb.f.) Rchb.f.

Synonyms
- Laelia dormaniana Rchb.f.; × Laeliocattleya dormaniana (Rchb.f.) Rolfe; Cattleya dormaniana var. alba L.C. Menezes; Cattleya dormaniana f. alba (L.C. Menezes) Christenson

= Cattleya dormaniana =

Dorman's cattleya

Species of orchid

Cattleya dormaniana, or Dorman's cattleya, is a bifoliate Cattleya species of orchid. The diploid chromosome number of C. dormaniana has been determined as 2n = 40.
