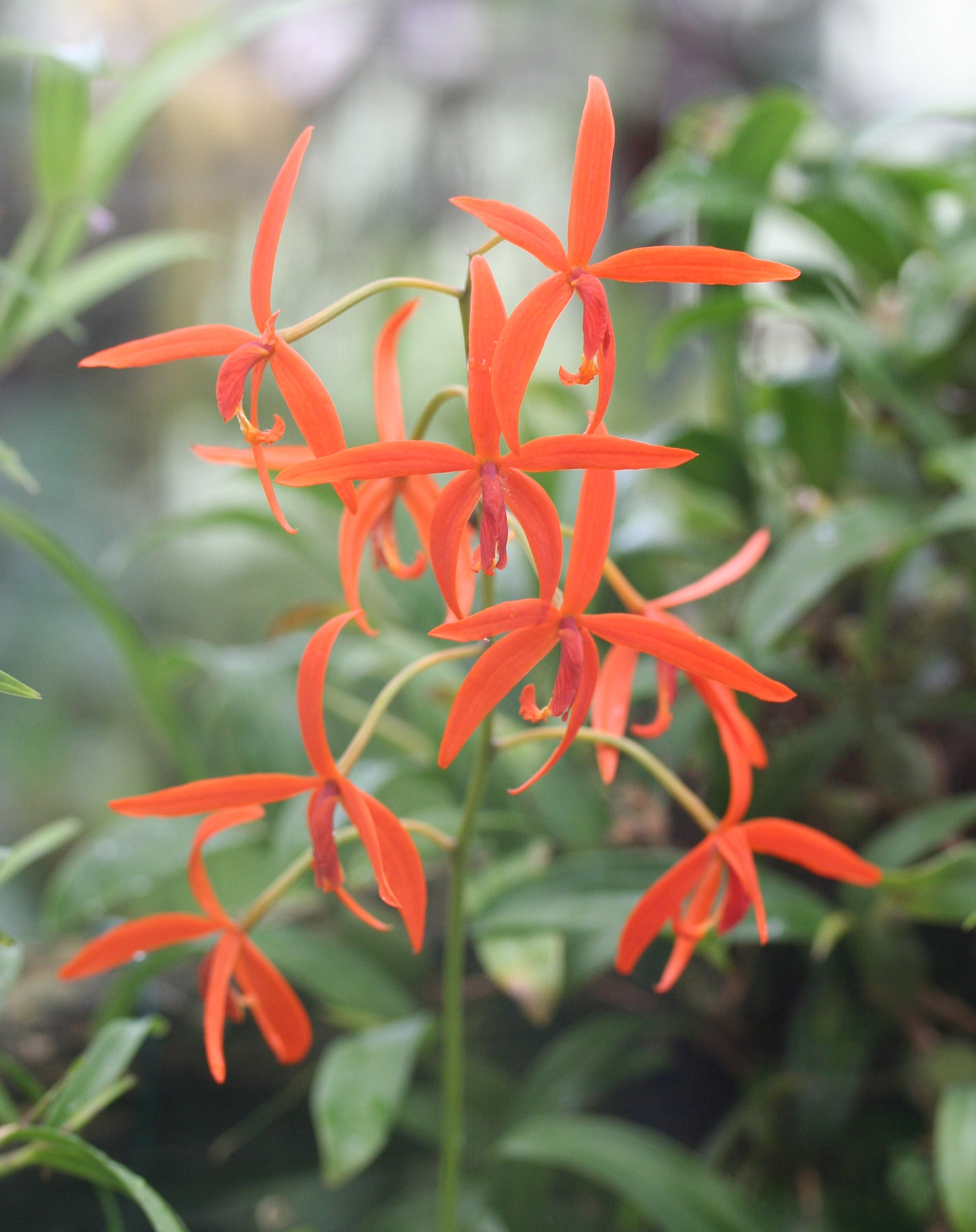
- Illustration of Cattleya cinnabarina

Scientific classification
- Kingdom: Plantae
- Clade: Tracheophytes
- Clade: Angiosperms
- Clade: Monocots
- Order: Asparagales
- Family: Orchidaceae
- Subfamily: Epidendroideae
- Genus: Cattleya
- Subgenus: Cattleya subg. Cattleya
- Section: Cattleya sect. Crispae
- Species: C. cinnabarina

Binomial name
- Cattleya cinnabarina Van den Berg.

Synonyms
- Laelia cinnabarina

= Cattleya cinnabarina =

Species of orchid

Cattleya cinnabarina is a lithophyte from Brazil, growing at intermediate elevations. The inflorescences emerge from the top of new pseudobulbs, each carrying a dozen or so bright orange flowers.

== Images ==
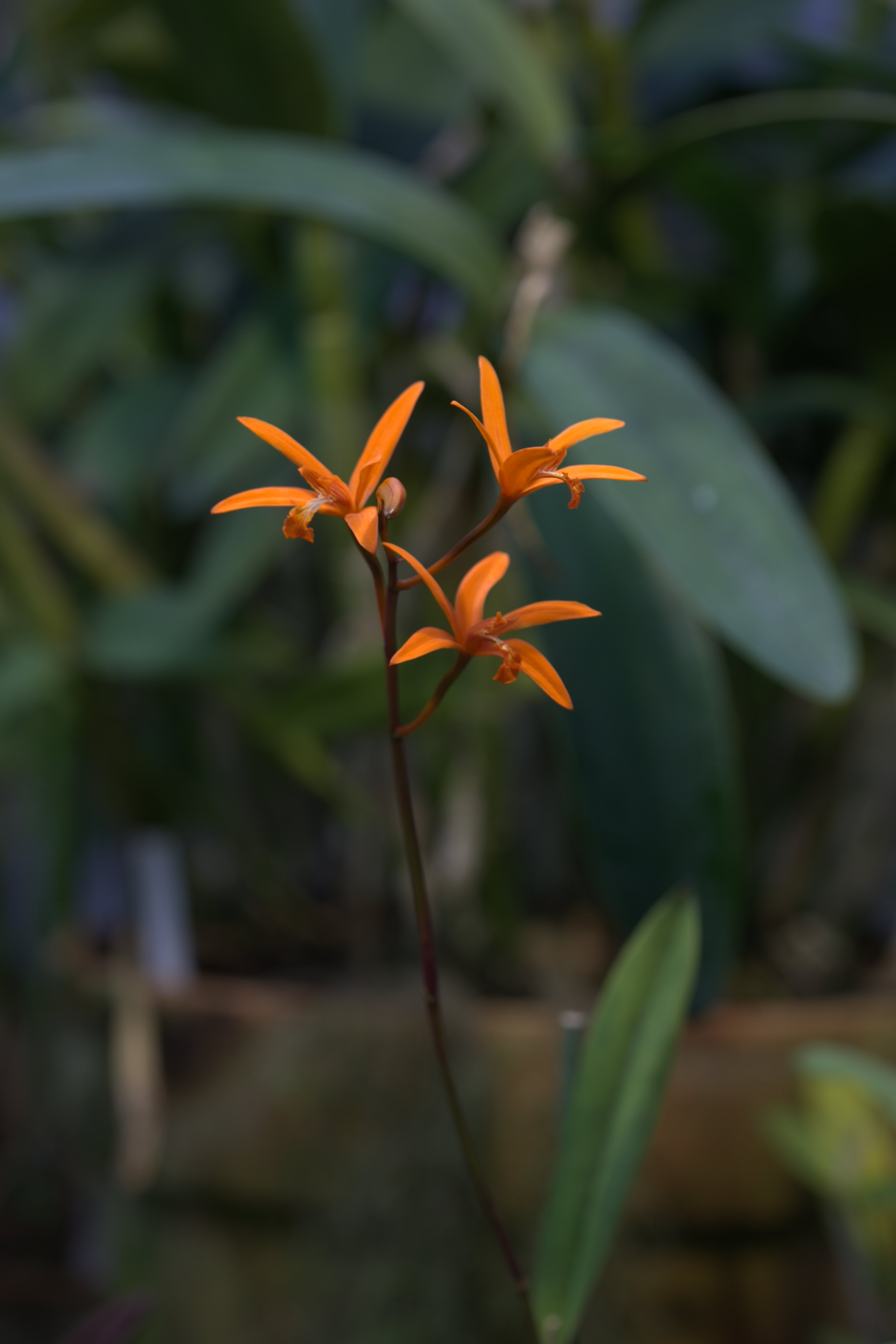

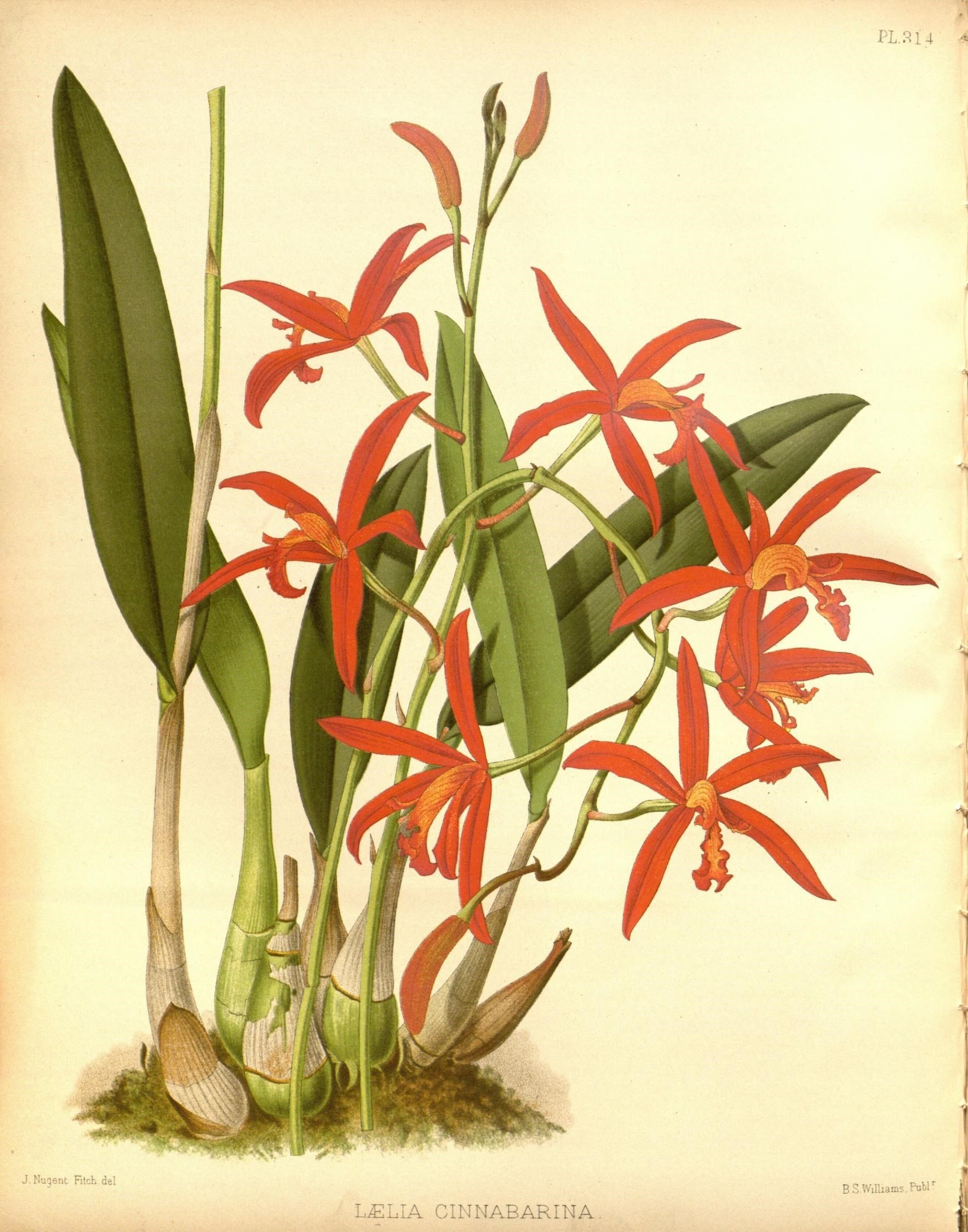
