= Schomburgkia =

Former genus of orchids

Schomburgkia was a genus of plants belonging to the family Orchidaceae. This genus was named for Richard Schomburgk, a German botanist who explored British Guiana during the 19th century. Former species of this genus were either epiphytic or lithophytic in their growth habit. According to the Royal Horticultural Society Schom. was the official abbreviation for this genus.

The genus was named in 1838 by Lindley, with Schomburgkia crispa, a large sized, hot growing plant found in the tropical areas of Venezuela, Suriname, Brazil, Colombia and Ecuador, as the type species. In 1941, Schom. crispa was moved to the genus Laelia by L.O.Williams. Its accepted name is now Laelia marginata. The member species of Schomburgkia have since been moved to different genera: Myrmecophila, Laelia, and Pseudolaelia.

== Former species ==
- Schomburgkia albopurpurea (W.H.W.Strachan ex Fawc.) Withner, Grand Cayman Island, now Myrmecophila albopurpurea (W.H.W.Strachan ex Fawc.) Nir
- Schomburgkia brysiana Lem, now Myrmecophila brysiana (Lem.) G.C.Kenn
- Schomburgkia crispa Lindl. (Brazil) : type species, now Laelia marginata
- Schomburgkia elata Schltr., now Laelia elata (Schltr.) J.M.H.Shaw
- Schomburgkia exaltata Kraenzl., Central America, now Myrmecophila exaltata (Kraenzl.) G.C. Kenn.
- Schomburgkia galeottiana A.Rich., now Myrmecophila galeottiana (A.Rich.) Rolfe
- Schomburgkia gloriosa Rchb.f., now Laelia gloriosa (Rchb.f.) L.O.Williams
- Schomburgkia grandiflora (Lindl.) Sander, now Myrmecophila grandiflora (Lindl.) Carnevali & J.L.Tapia & I.Ramirez
- Schomburgkia heidii Carnevali, now Laelia heidii (Carnevali) Van den Berg
- Schomburgkia humboldtii (Rchb.f.) Rchb.f., Central America, now Myrmecophila humboldtii (Rchb.f) Rolfe
- Schomburgkia lueddemannii Prill., now Laelia lueddemannii (Prill.) L.O.Williams
- Schomburgkia lyonsii Lindl., now Laelia lyonsii (Lindl.) L.O.Williams
- Schomburgkia marginata Lindl., now Laelia marginata (Lindl.) L.O.Williams
- Schomburgkia moyobambae Schltr., now Laelia moyobambae (Schltr.) C.Schweinf.
- Schomburgkia rosea Linden ex Lindl. (Colombia), now Laelia rosea (Linden ex Lindl.) C.Schweinf.
- Schomburgkia schultzei Schltr., now Laelia schultzei (Schltr.) J.M.H.Shaw
- Schomburgkia splendida Schltr., now Laelia splendida (Schltr.) L.O.Williams
- Schomburgkia superbiens (Lindl.) Rolfe, now Laelia superbiens Lindl.
- Schomburgkia thomsoniana Rchb.f., Cayman Islands, now Myrmecophila thomsoniana (Rchb.f) Rolfe
  - Schomburgkia thomsoniana var. atropurpurea Hook.f., Grand Cayman, now Myrmecophila thomsoniana var. thomsoniana
  - Schomburgkia thomsoniana var. minor Hook.f., nom. illeg., now Myrmecophila thomsoniana var. minor (W.H.W.Strachan ex Fawc.) Dressler
- Schomburgkia tibicinis (Bateman ex Lindl.) Bateman, Central America, now Myrmecophila tibicinis (Bateman ex Lindl.) Rolfe
- Schomburgkia undulata Lindl. Costa Rica to Trinidad, now Laelia undulata (Lindl.) L.O.Williams
- Schomburgkia vellozicola Hoehne SE Brazil, now Pseudolaelia vellozicola (Hoehne) Porto & Brade
- Schomburgkia wallisii] Rchb.f. Columbia, now Laelia colombiana J.M.H.Shaw
- Schomburgkia weberbaueriana] Kraenzl. (Bolivia; Peru), now Laelia weberbaueriana (Kraenzl.) C.Schweinf.
- Schomburgkia wendlandii (Rchb.f.) H.G.Jones, Central America, now Myrmecophila wendlandii (Rchb.f.) G.C.Kenn.

== See also ==
- Laelia
- Myrmecophila - a very near genus
- Pseudolaelia
