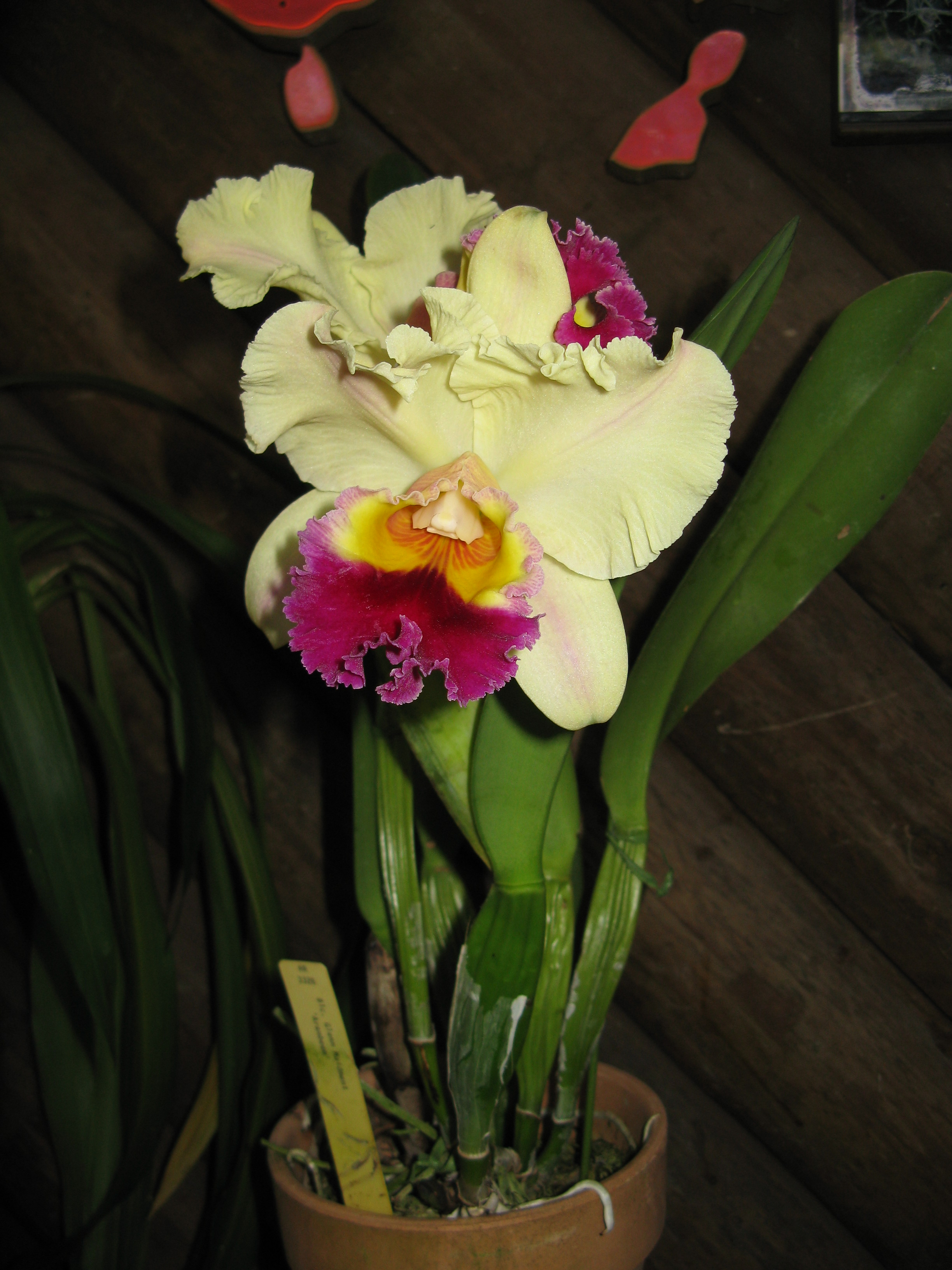
- Rlc. Glen Maidment 'Aranbeen'; Registered in 1998 as a × Brassolaeliocattleya: Rlc. Toshie Aoki × C. Horace

Scientific classification
- Kingdom: Plantae
- Clade: Tracheophytes
- Clade: Angiosperms
- Clade: Monocots
- Order: Asparagales
- Family: Orchidaceae
- Subfamily: Epidendroideae
- Tribe: Epidendreae
- Subtribe: Laeliinae
- Genus: × Brassolaeliocattleya hort.

Greges
- Many cultivars

= × Brassolaeliocattleya =

Genus of flowering plants

× Brassolaeliocattleya, abbreviated Blc. in the horticultural trade, is the orchid nothogenus for intergeneric hybrid greges containing at least one ancestor species from each of the three ancestral genera Brassavola R.Br., Cattleya Lindl. and Laelia Lindl., and from no other genera.

== Nomenclatural history ==
As the name was used in 1999, there were many greges which were among the most spectacular of cultivated orchids, being particularly valued for the large showy labellum. By 2009, the "Brassavola" parents most commonly used in producing × Brassolaeliocattleya hybrids had been moved into the genus Rhyncholaelia, and the "Laelia" parents most commonly used in producing × Brassolaeliocattleya hybrids had been moved into the genus Cattleya. As a result, most of the greges that were classified as × Brassolaeliocattleya in 1999 are now classified in the nothogenus × Rhyncholaeliocattleya, although others are now placed in several nothogenera:

| 1999 | 2009 Nothogenus | 2009 | parentage (1999) | parentage (2009) | parental genera |
| Blc. Glenn Maidment | Rhyncholaeliocattleya | Rlc. Glenn Maidment | Blc. Toshie Aoki × C. Horace | Rlc. Toshie Aoki × C. Horace | Cattleya × Rhyncholaelia |
| Blc. Bakersfield Centennial | Rhyncatlaelia | Ryc. Bakersfield Centennial | L. anceps × Blc. Mahina Yahiro | L. anceps × Rlc. Mahina Yahiro | Cattleya × Laelia × Rhyncholaelia |
| Blc. Herons Enchantment | Rhyncattleanthe | Rth. Herons Enchantment | Lc. Land of Enchantment × Blc. Herons Ghyll | Ctt. Land of Enchantment × Rlc. Herons Ghyll | Cattleya × Guarianthe × Rhyncholaelia |
| Blc. Chestnut Ridge | Rhynchoguarlia | Rgl. Chestnut Ridge | Ryn. Daffodil × Lc. Meadow Gold | Ryn. Daffodil × Lnt. Meadow Gold | Guarianthe × Laelia × Rhyncholaelia |
| Blc. Cherise Nagami | Rechingerara | Rechingerara Cherise Nagami | Lc. Meadow Gold x Blc. Orange Nuggett Orange Nuggett | Lnt. Meadow Gold x Rth. Orange Nuggett | Cattleya × Guarianthe × Laelia × Rhyncholaelia |
| Blc. Esther Del Favero | Brassocattleya | Bc. Esther Del Favero | Bl. Richard Mueller × C. ammethystoglossa | Bc. Richard Mueller × C. amethystoglossa | Brassavola × Cattleya |
| Blc. Hawaiian Treat | Brassocatanthe | Bct. Hawaiian Treat | Bl. Richard Mueller × Lc. Trick or Treat | Bc. Richard Mueller × Ctt. Trick or Treat | Brassavola × Cattleya × Guarianthe |
| Blc. Haiku Dawn | Rhynchobrassoleya | Rby. Haiku Dawn | Bl. Richard Mueller × Blc. Goldenzelle | Bc. Richard Mueller × Rlc. Goldenzelle | Brassavola × Cattleya × Rhyncholaelia |
| Blc. Galadriel | Cahuzacara | Chz. Galadriel | Bc. Bill Worsley × Blc. Limelight | Bsn. Bill Worsley × Rlc. Limelight | Brassavola × Cattleya × Guarianthe' × Rhyncholaelia |
| Blc. Heirloom | Brassolaeliocattleya | Blc. Heirloom | Bc. Binosa × Laelia rubescens | Bc. Binosa × Laelia rubescens | Brasavola × Cattleya × Laelia |
| Blc. Jose's Golden Key | Keyesara | Key. Jose's Golden Key | Blc. Golden Tang × Laelia rubescens var. aurea | Rby. Golden Tang x Laelia aurea | Brassavola × Cattleya × Laelia × Rhyncholaelia |
