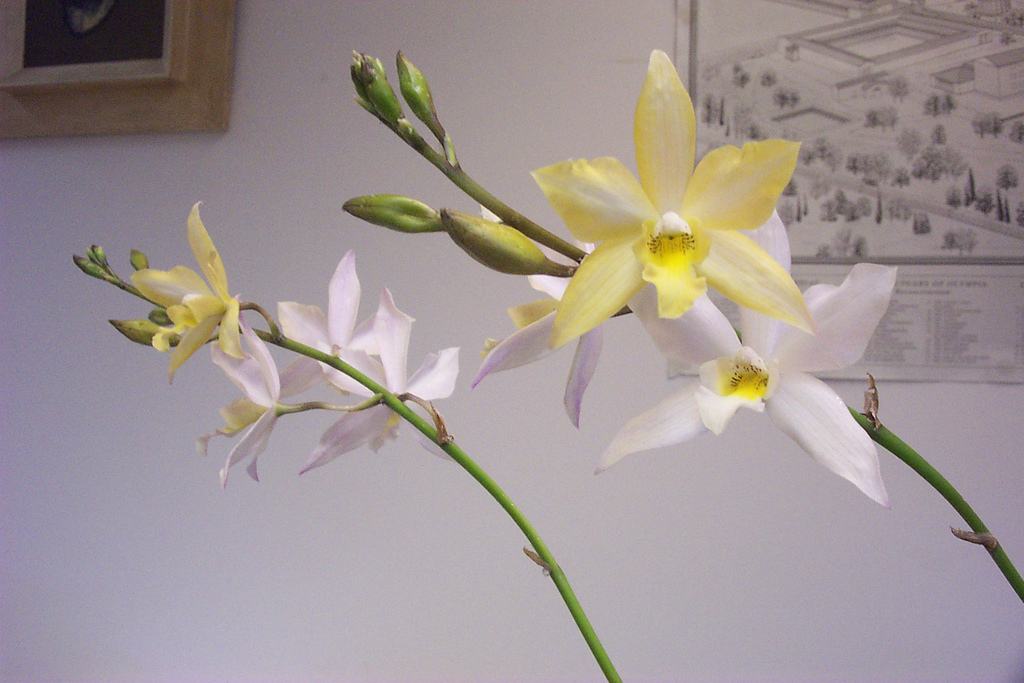
- Caulaelia Snowflake × C. Coronet = (Caularthron bicornutum × Laelia albida) × ( Cattleya cinnabarina × Cattleya harpophylla )

Scientific classification
- Kingdom: Plantae
- Clade: Tracheophytes
- Clade: Angiosperms
- Clade: Monocots
- Order: Asparagales
- Family: Orchidaceae
- Subfamily: Epidendroideae
- Tribe: Epidendreae
- Subtribe: Laeliinae
- Genus: × Laeliocatarthron; J.M.H.Shaw

= × Laeliocatarthron =

Genus of flowering plants

× Laeliocatarthron, abbreviated Lcr. in the horticultural trade, is the nothogenus containing intergeneric hybrids with at least one ancestor in each of the natural genera Cattleya, Caularthron, and Laelia, and with no ancestors in any other natural genera.

== Origin ==
A × Laeliocatarthron can be produced by hybrids of the following nothogenera and/or natural genera:

- Cattleya × Caulaelia
- Caularthron × Laeliocattleya
- Caulaelia × Laeliocattleya
- Caulaelia × Caulocattleya
- Caulocattleya × Laeliocattleya
- Caulocattleya × Laelia
- Laeliocatarthron × Cattleya
- Laeliocatarthron × Caulaelia
- Laeliocatarthron × Caularthron
- Laeliocatarthron × Caulocattleya
- Laeliocatarthron × Laelia
- Laeliocatarthron × Laeliocatarthron
- Laeliocatarthron × Laeliocattleya
