= Orchid (color) =

Bright rich purple color

Color coordinates
- Hex triplet: #DA70D6
- sRGB^{B} (r, g, b): (218, 112, 214)
- HSV (h, s, v): (302°, 49%, 85%)
- CIELCh_{uv} (L, C, h): (63, 80, 310°)
- Source: X11
- ISCC–NBS descriptor: Vivid purple
- B: Normalized to [0–255] (byte)

Orchid is a bright rich purple color that resembles the color which various orchids often exhibit.

Various tones of orchid may range from grayish purple to purplish-pink to strong reddish purple.

The first recorded use of orchid as a color name in English was in 1915.

In 1987, orchid was included as one of the X11 colors. After the invention of the World Wide Web in 1991, these became known as the X11 web colors.

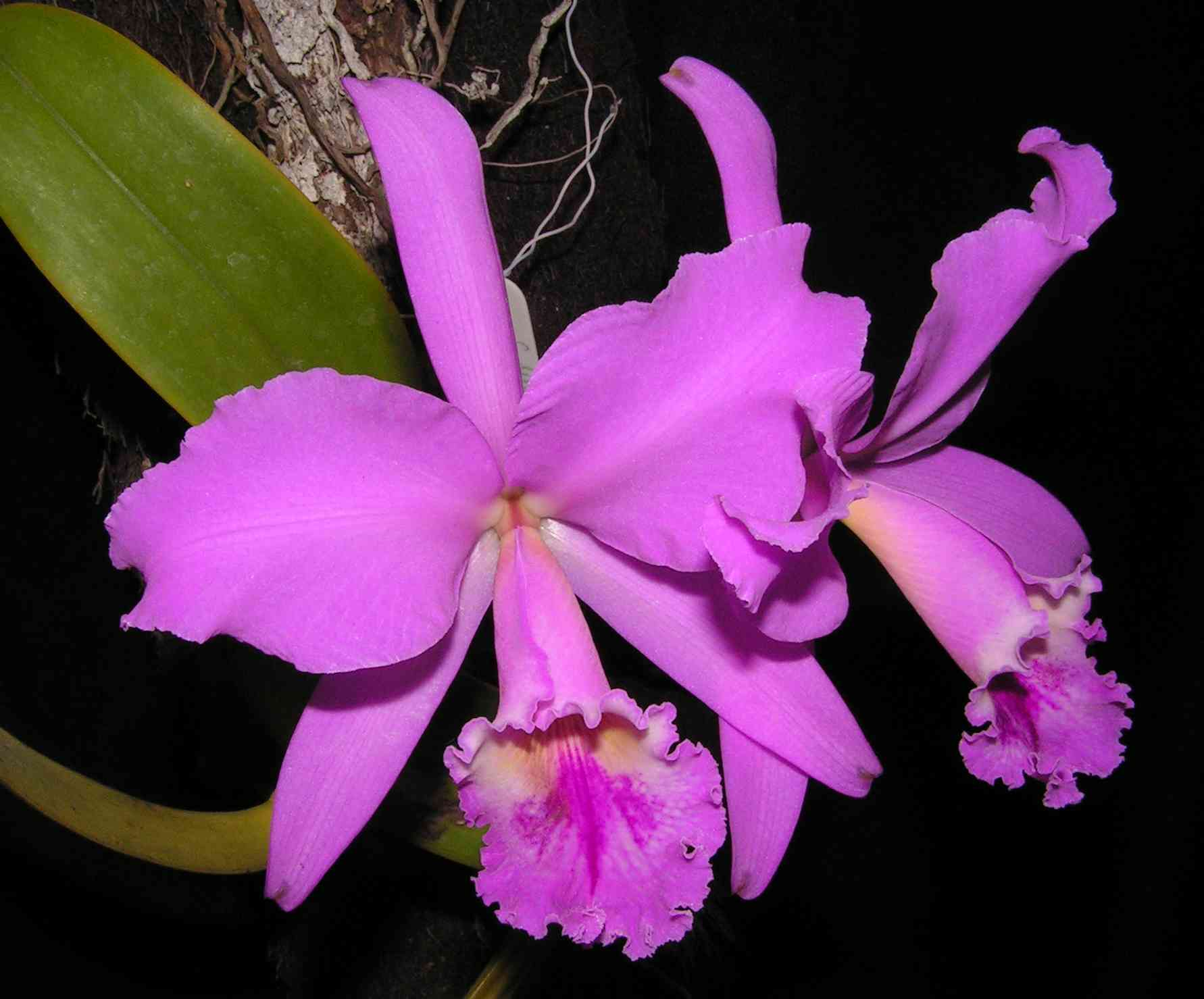
Cattleya labiata

== Derivation ==
The name originates from the flowers of some species of the vast orchid family (Orchidaceae), such as Laelia furfuracea and Ascocentrum pusillum, which have petals of this color. The word Orchid derives from the Greek word orchis which means testicle, after the appearance of the tubers of plants of the genus Orchis.

== Variations of orchid ==
=== Orchid pink ===
Orchid Pink

Color coordinates
- Hex triplet: #F2BDCD
- sRGB^{B} (r, g, b): (242, 189, 205)
- HSV (h, s, v): (342°, 22%, 95%)
- CIELCh_{uv} (L, C, h): (82, 32, 351°)
- Source: Pantone TPX
- ISCC–NBS descriptor: Pale purplish pink
- B: Normalized to [0–255] (byte)

Displayed at right is the color orchid pink.

The source of this color is the "Pantone Textile Paper eXtended (TPX)" color list, color #13-2010 TPX—Orchid Pink.

=== Orchid (Crayola) ===
Orchid (Crayola)

Color coordinates
- Hex triplet: #E29CD2
- sRGB^{B} (r, g, b): (226, 156, 210)
- HSV (h, s, v): (314°, 31%, 89%)
- CIELCh_{uv} (L, C, h): (73, 49, 320°)
- Source: Crayola
- B: Normalized to [0–255] (byte)

Displayed at right is the color that is called "orchid" in Crayola crayons. Orchid has been a Crayola crayon color since 1949.

In 2008, the color was temporarily renamed "best friends" for Kids' Choice Colors, before reverting the name back to orchid in 2009.

=== Wild orchid ===
Wild Orchid

Color coordinates
- Hex triplet: #D470A2
- sRGB^{B} (r, g, b): (212, 112, 162)
- HSV (h, s, v): (330°, 47%, 83%)
- CIELCh_{uv} (L, C, h): (60, 63, 341°)
- Source: Pantone TPX
- ISCC–NBS descriptor: Deep purplish pink
- B: Normalized to [0–255] (byte)

Displayed at right is the color wild orchid.

The source of this color is the "Pantone Textile Paper eXtended (TPX)" color list, color #16-2120 TPX—Wild Orchid.

=== Dark orchid ===
Dark Orchid

Color coordinates
- Hex triplet: #9932CC
- sRGB^{B} (r, g, b): (153, 50, 204)
- HSV (h, s, v): (280°, 75%, 80%)
- CIELCh_{uv} (L, C, h): (43, 99, 288°)
- Source: X11
- ISCC–NBS descriptor: Vivid purple
- B: Normalized to [0–255] (byte)

Displayed at right is the web color dark orchid.

=== Dark Pink (Perbang) ===
Dark Pink (PerBang)

Color coordinates
- Hex triplet: #B300A3
- sRGB^{B} (r, g, b): (179, 0, 163)
- HSV (h, s, v): (305°, 100%, 70%)
- CIELCh_{uv} (L, C, h): (42, 92, 315°)
- Source: perbang.dk
- ISCC–NBS descriptor: Strong orchid
- B: Normalized to [0–255] (byte)

Displayed at right is the web color dark pink (PerBang).

== See also ==
- List of colors
- Orchid
