= RLC =

RLC may refer to:

== Education ==
- Redeemer Lutheran College, Queensland, Australia
- Rosseau Lake College, Ontario, Canada

== Engineering ==
- RLC circuit, resonant electronic circuit
- Radio Link Control, air interface protocol

== Organizations ==
- Ralph Lauren Corporation, a fashion company
- Redfern Legal Centre, NSW, Australia
- Robinsons Land Corporation, a JG Summit subsidiary
- Rockwell Land Corporation, a Lopez Holdings second-tier subsidiary
- Rugby League Conference, Britain

== Politics ==
- Republican Liberty Caucus, US political organization
- Republican Leadership Council, a US political advocacy group

== Other uses ==
- Red Light Center, a virtual world or metaverse created by Utherverse Digital, Inc.
- Red Line Club, a Hot Wheels membership club
- Revived Late Cornish, a variety of the Cornish language
- Royal Logistic Corps of the British Army
- Ruben Loftus-Cheek, English footballer
- Rlc., the abbreviation for × Rhyncholaeliocattleya, a nothogenus of

orchids
