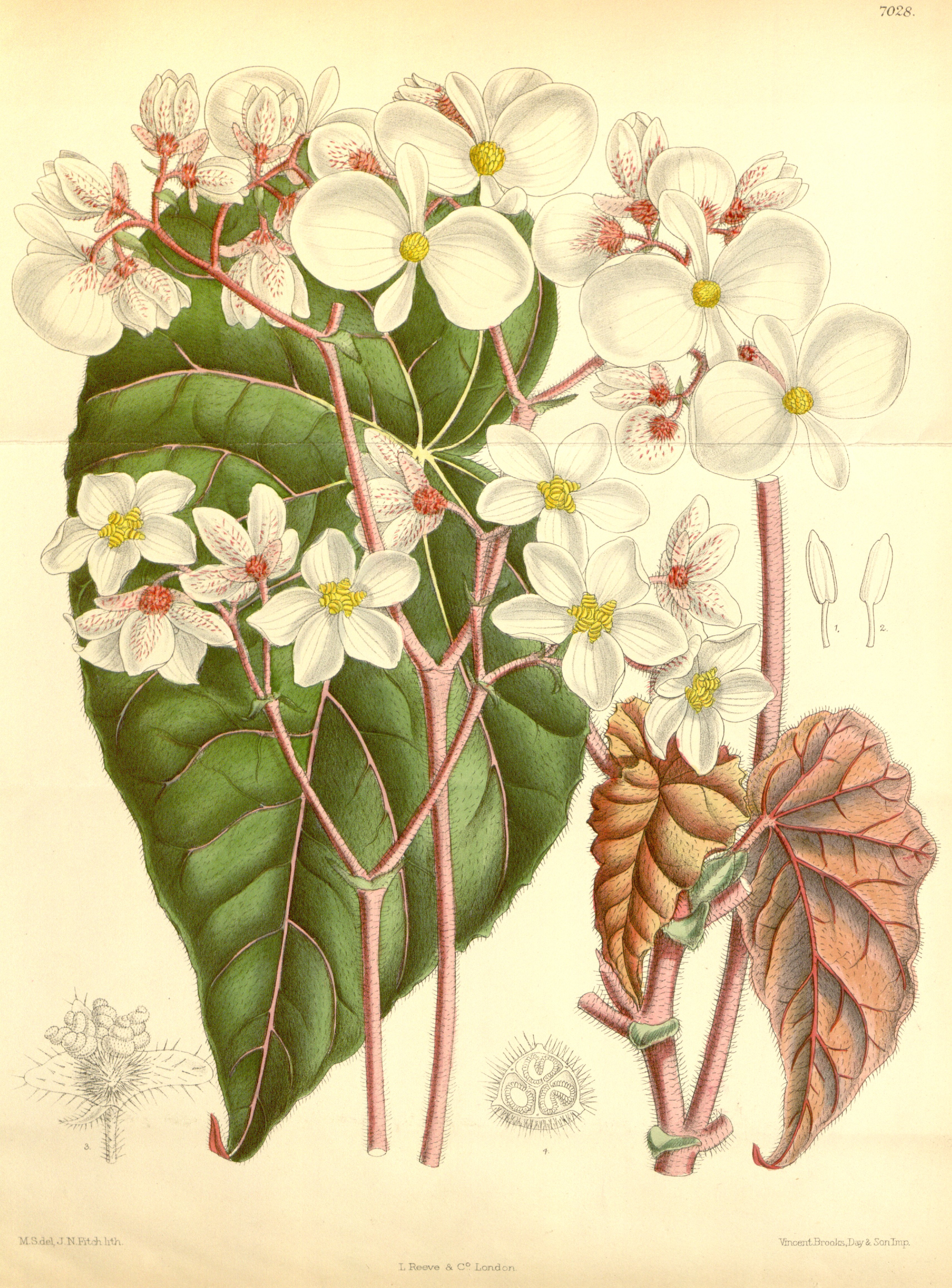
- Begonia scharffii drawn by John Nugent Fitch for Curtis's Botanical Magazine

Scientific classification
- Kingdom: Plantae
- Clade: Tracheophytes
- Clade: Angiosperms
- Clade: Eudicots
- Clade: Rosids
- Order: Cucurbitales
- Family: Begoniaceae
- Genus: Begonia
- Species: B. scharffiana

Binomial name
- Begonia scharffiana Regel

Synonyms
- List: Begonia cataractarum J.Braun & K.Schum.; Begonia scharffii Hook.f.; Begonia scharffiana var. minor W.Watson

= Begonia scharffiana =

Species of flowering plant

Begonia scharffiana, the elephant ear begonia, is a species of flowering plant in the family Begoniaceae, native to southern Brazil, discovered on Santa Catarina Island in 1888.

B. scharffiana has a shrub-like growing habit. It is a medium-height garden plant that prefers light shade, and blooms mid-summer thru winter. The flowers have white sepals with red hairs on the base.

== Images ==
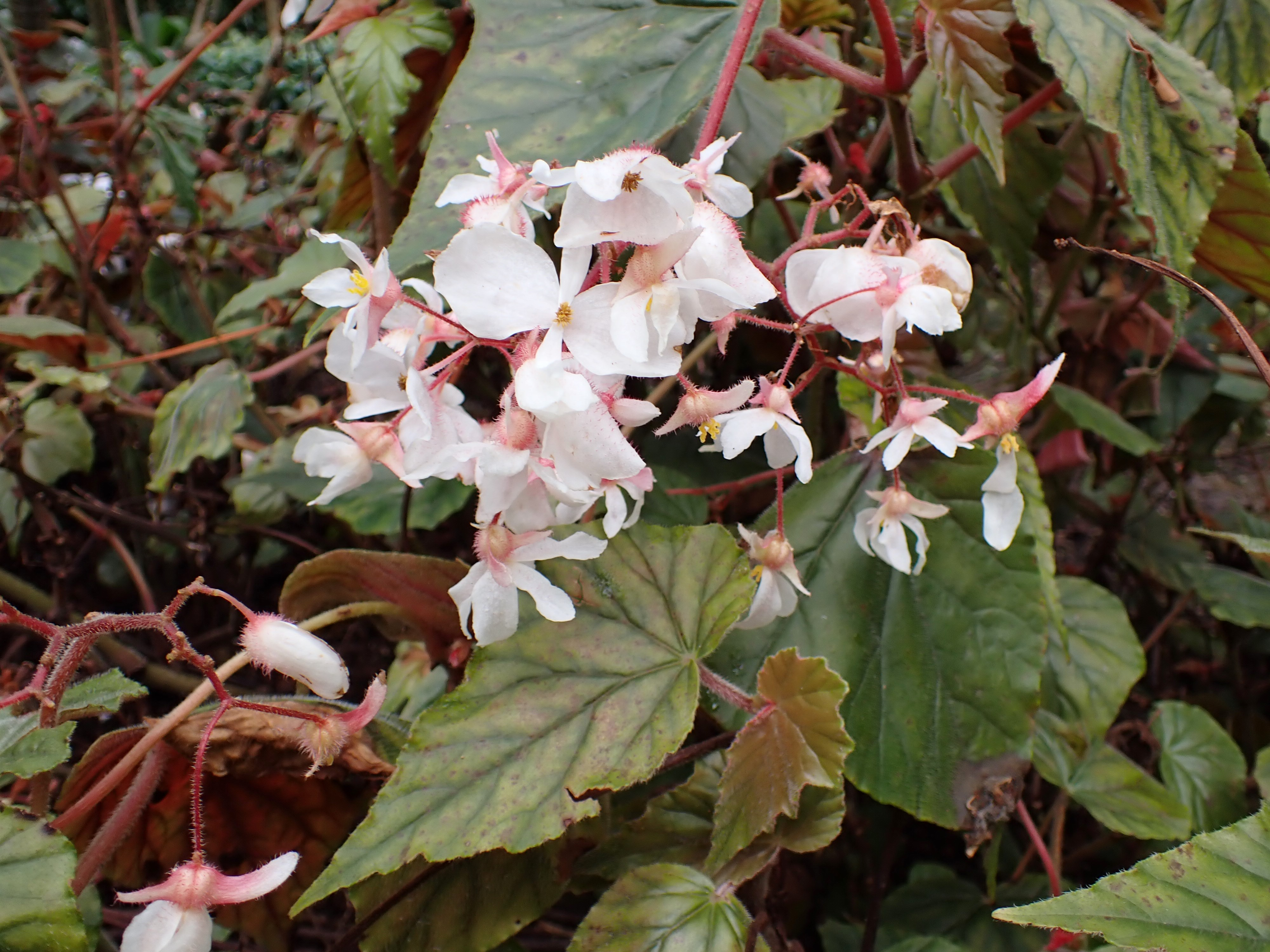

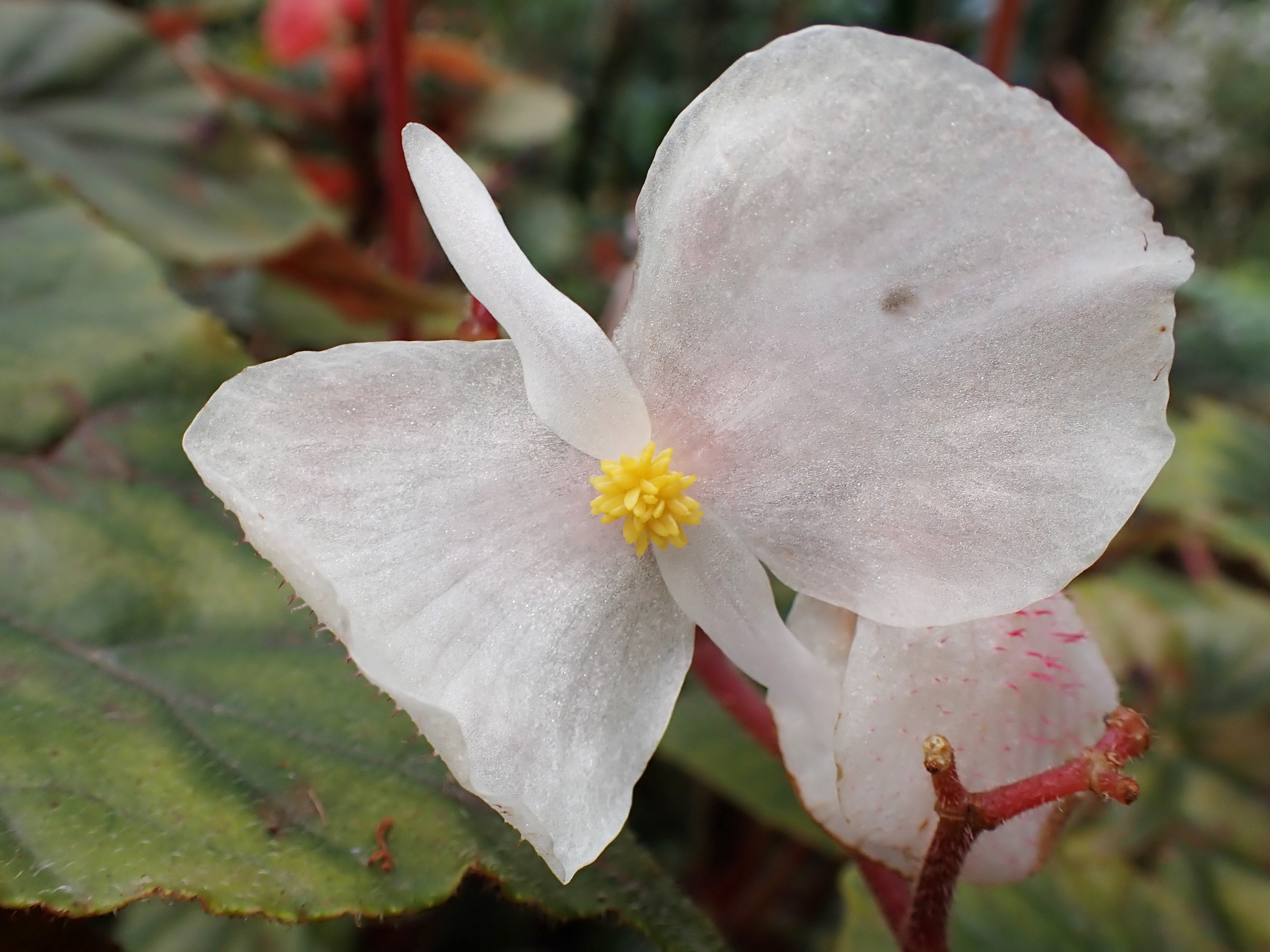

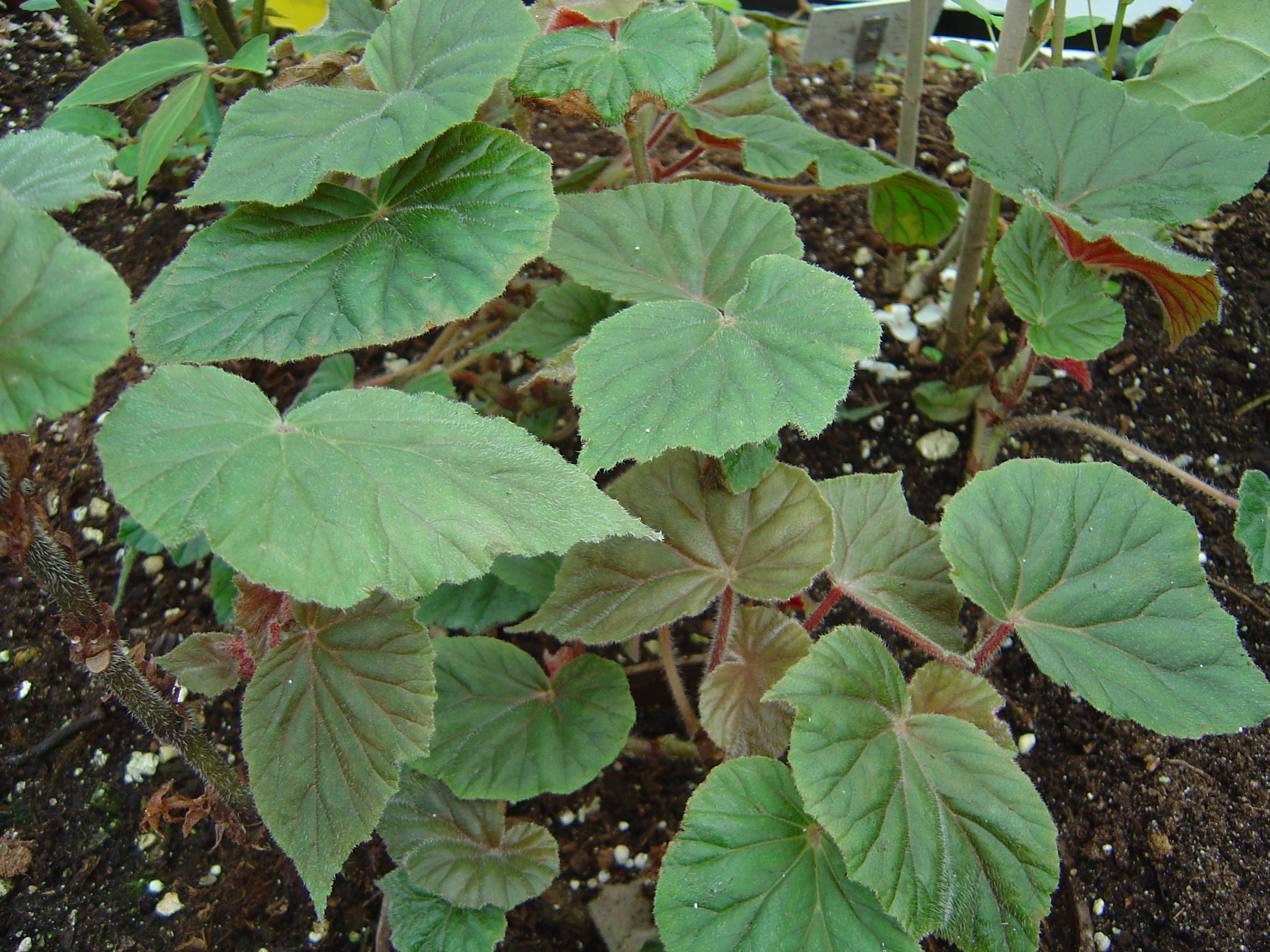
