= The Orchid Album =

- Author: Robert Warner, Benjamin Samuel Williams, Henry Williams, William Hugh Gower

The Orchid Album, Comprising Coloured Figures and Descriptions of New, Rare, and Beautiful Orchidaceous Plants, known as The Orchid Album, is a horticultural work by Robert Warner and Benjamin Samuel Williams of eleven volumes published between 1872 and 1897 and illustrated by John Nugent Fitch and by Gertrude Hamilton.

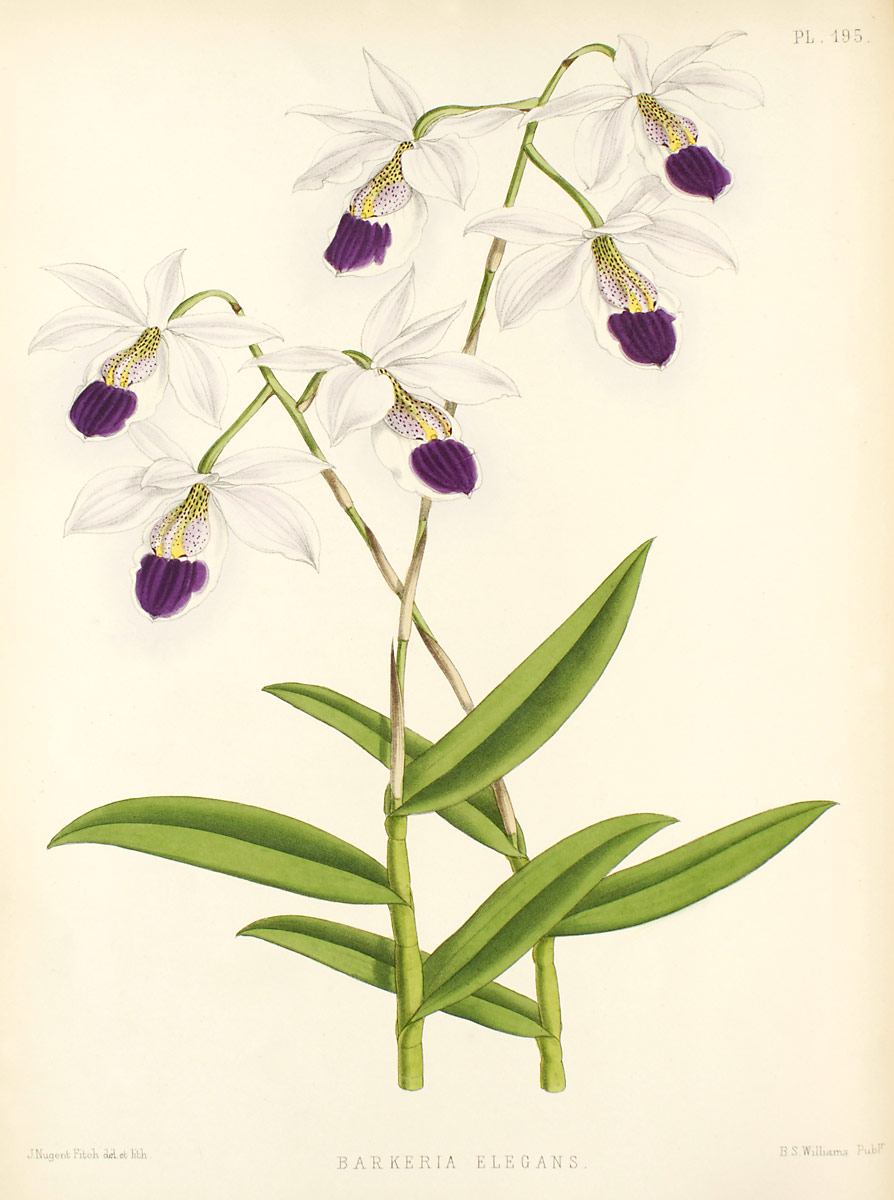
Barkeria uniflora

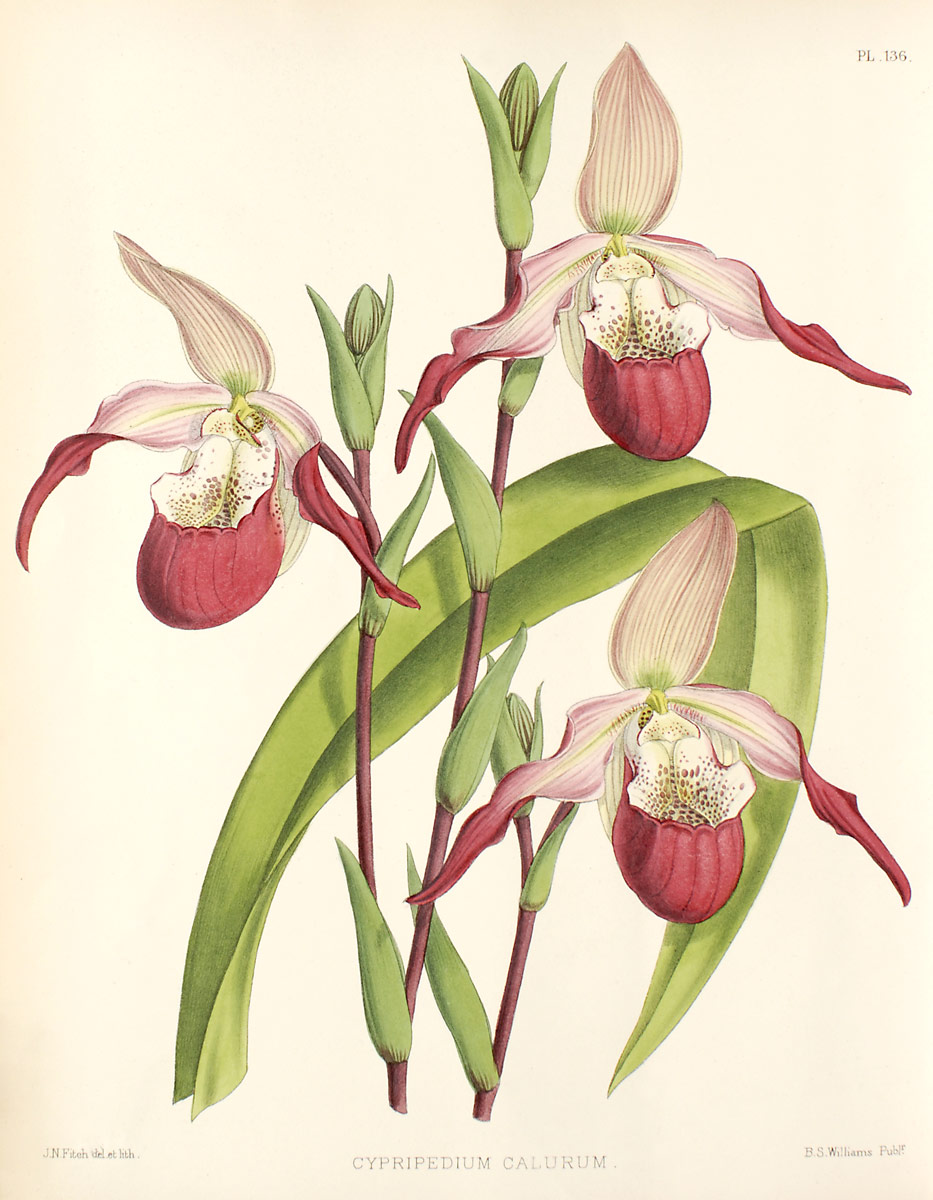
Phragmipedium calurum

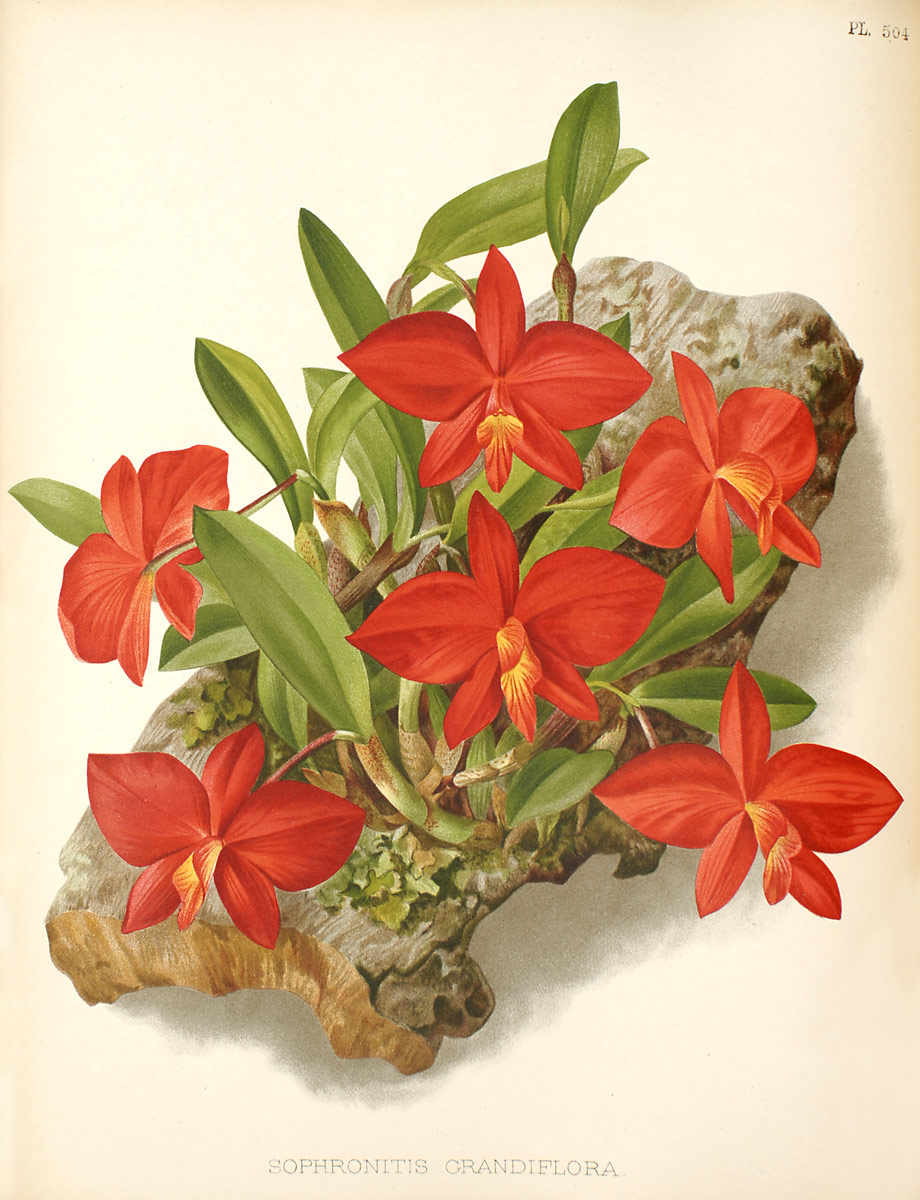
Sophronitis coccinea

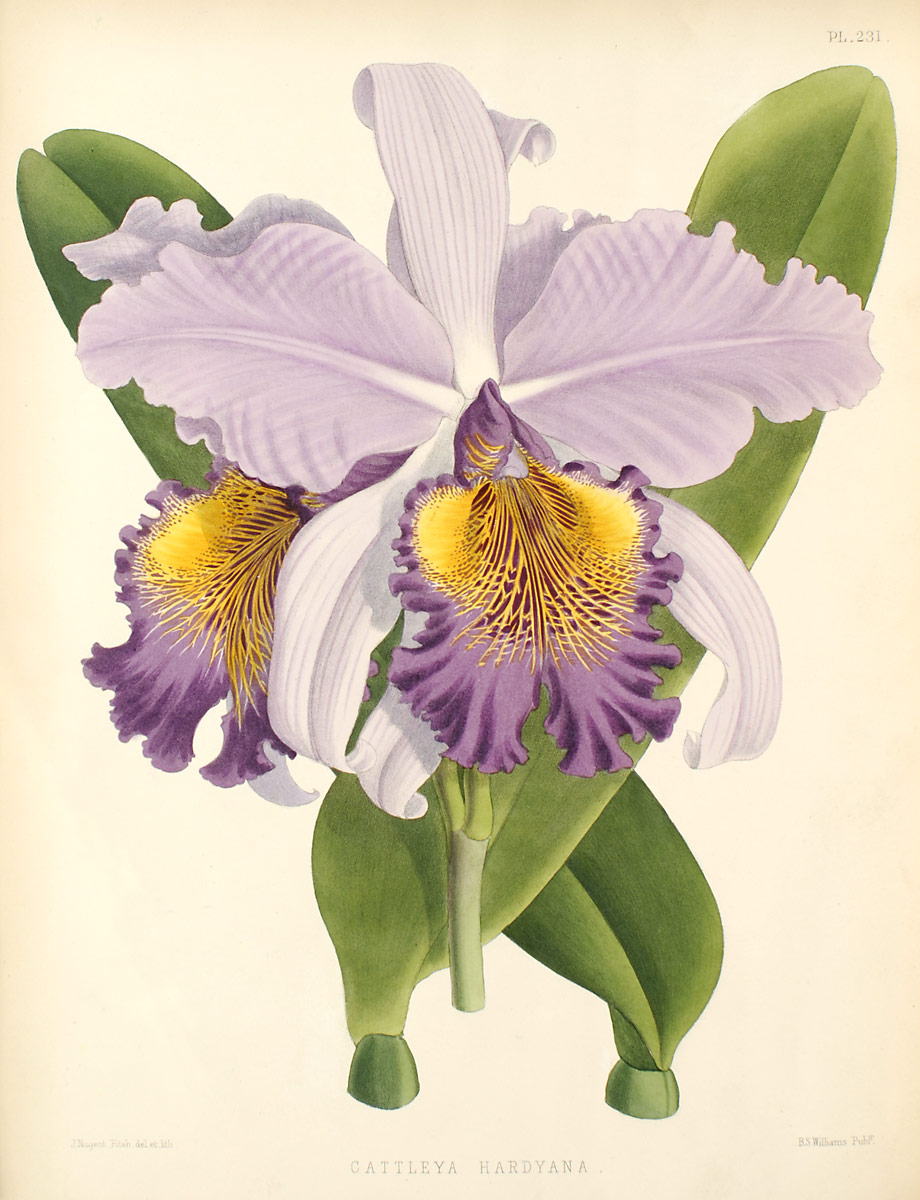
Cattleya hardyana

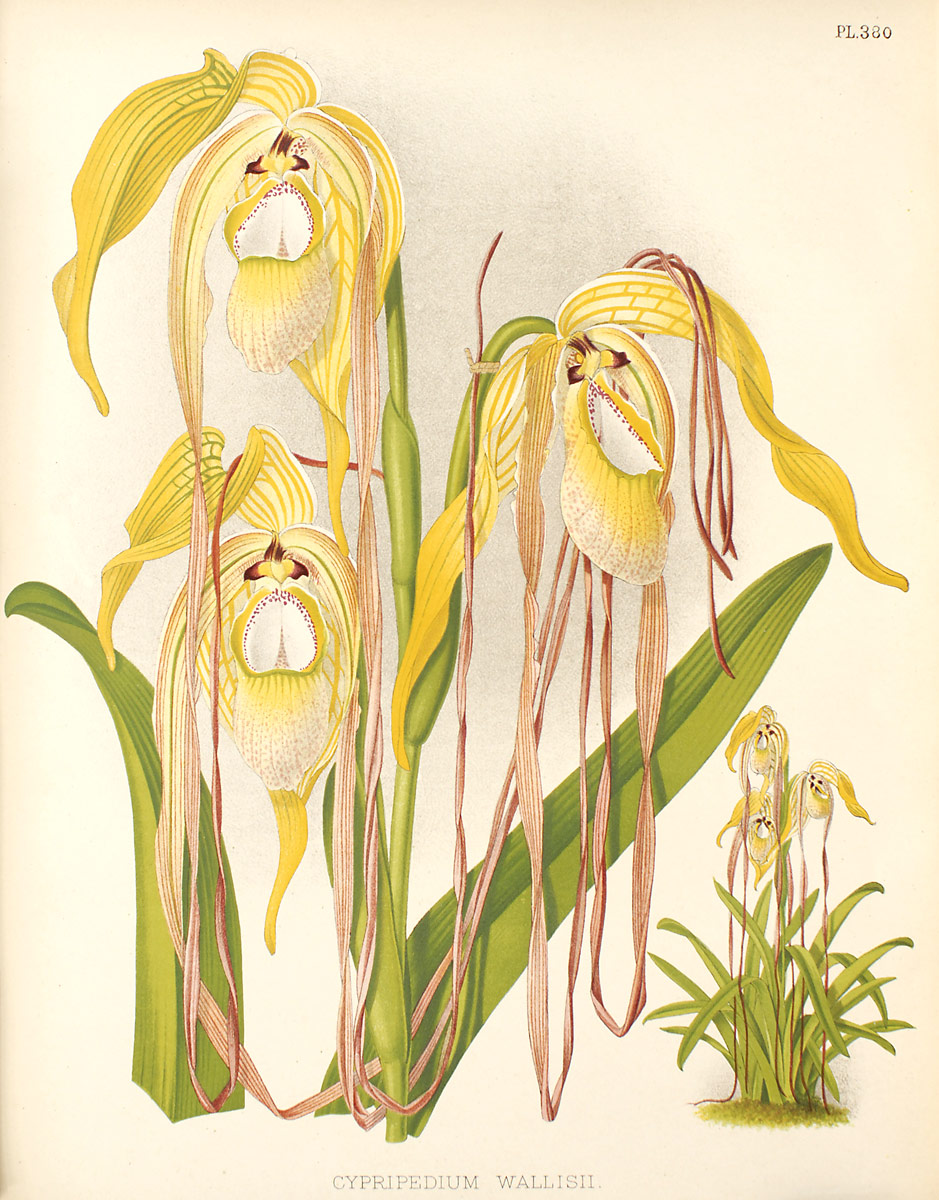
Phragmipedium warszewiczianum
