= Laelia rosea =

Laelia rosea may refer to:

- Laelia rosea (moth), a species of insect
- Laelia rosea (plant), a species of orchid
