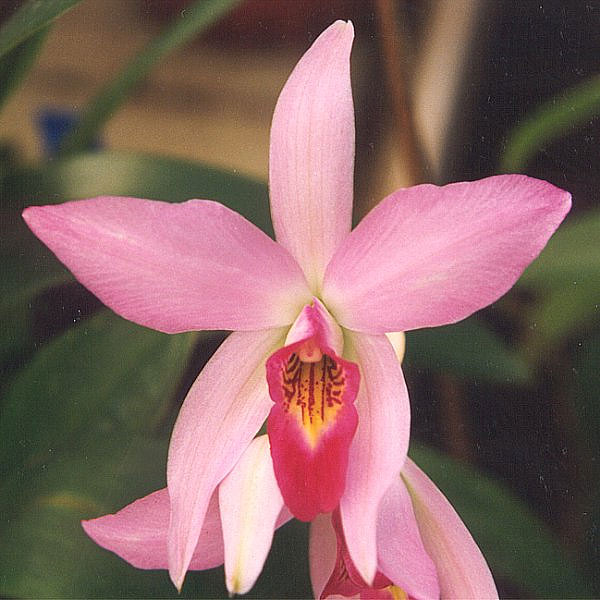
- Laelia anceps

Scientific classification
- Kingdom: Plantae
- Clade: Embryophytes
- Clade: Tracheophytes
- Clade: Spermatophytes
- Clade: Angiosperms
- Clade: Monocots
- Order: Asparagales
- Family: Orchidaceae
- Subfamily: Epidendroideae
- Tribe: Epidendreae
- Subtribe: Laeliinae
- Genus: Laelia; Lindl., 1831

Type species
- Laelia speciosa (Kunth) Schltr. 1914

Species
- See text

= Laelia =

Genus of orchids

Laelia is a small genus of 25 species in the orchid family (Orchidaceae). Laelia species are found in areas of subtropical or temperate climate in Central and South America, but mostly in Mexico. Laelia is abbreviated L. in the horticultural trade.

== Description ==
Mostly epiphyte herbs (with a few lithophytes) with laterally compressed pseudobulbs. One to four leathery or fleshy leaves are born near the top of each pseudobulb, and can be broadly ovate to oblong. The inflorescence is a terminal raceme (rarely a panicle). The flowers have 8 pollinia; petals are of a thinner texture than the sepals; sepals and petals are of similar shape, but the sepals being narrower; the lip or labellum is free from the arched flower column.

== Distribution ==
Species of Laelia can be found from western Mexico south to Bolivia, from sea level to mountain forests.

== Taxonomy ==
The genus Laelia was described as part of subfamily Epidendroideae by John Lindley. Brazilian Laelias, after being classified for several years under Sophronitis, have now been placed in the genus Cattleya. Moreover, species formerly placed in the genus Schomburgkia have been moved either to the genus Laelia or Myrmecophila.

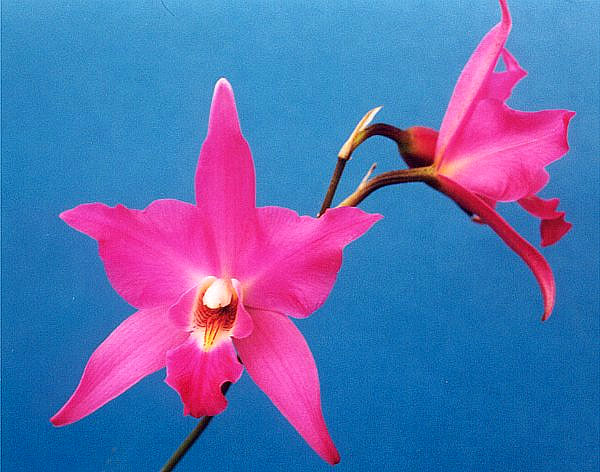
Laelia gouldiana

=== Species ===
Laelia comprises the following species:

Image	Name	Distribution	Elevation (m)
	Laelia albida Bateman ex Lindl. 1839	Mexico	1,000–2,000 metres (3,300–6,600 ft)
	Laelia anceps Lindl. 1835	Mexico and Honduras	500–1,500 metres (1,600–4,900 ft)
	Laelia aurea A.Navarro 1990	Mexico ( Durango, Sinaloa and Nayarit )	200 metres (660 ft)
	Laelia autumnalis (Lex.) Lindl. 1831	Mexico	1,500–2,600 metres (4,900–8,500 ft)
	Laelia colombiana J.M.H.Shaw 2008	Colombia and Venezuela	
	Laelia elata (Schltr.) J.M.H.Shaw 2009	Colombia	
	Laelia eyermaniana Rchb.f. 1888	Mexico (Nayarit, Michoacán, and Jalisco, Sonora, Chihuahua, Durango, Guanajuato, and Querétaro. Halbinger)	1,600–2,600 metres (5,200–8,500 ft)
	Laelia furfuracea Lindl. 1839	Mexico (Oxaca)	2,100–3,000 metres (6,900–9,800 ft)
	Laelia gloriosa (Rchb.f.) L.O.Williams 1860	Guyana, Venezuela, Colombia, Ecuador and northern Brazil	200–850 metres (660–2,790 ft)
	Laelia gouldiana Rchb.f. 1888	Mexico Hidalgo	1,550 metres (5,090 ft)
	Laelia × halbingeriana Salazar & Soto Arenas	Oaxaca, Mexico	1,160 metres (3,810 ft)
	Laelia heidii (Carnevali) Van den Berg & M.W.Chase 2004	Colombia and Venezuela	
	Laelia lueddemannii (Prill.) L.O.Williams 1940	Costa Rica, Panama, Colombia and Venezuela	0–600 metres (0–1,969 ft)
	Laelia lyonsii (Lindl.) L.O.Williams 1941	Cuba and Jamaica	0–800 metres (0–2,625 ft)
	Laelia marginata (Lindl.) L.O.Williams 1941	Colombia, Venezuela, French Guiana, Guyana, Suriname and Northern Brazil	
	Laelia mottae Archila, Chiron, Szlach. & Pérez-García 2014	Guatemala	400 metres (1,300 ft)
	Laelia moyobambae (Schltr.) C.Schweinf. 1944	Bolivia and Peru	
	Laelia rosea (Linden ex Lindl.) C.Schweinf. 1967	Colombia, Venezuela and Guyana	
	Laelia rubescens Lindl. 1840	Mexico, Guatemala, Belize, El Salvador, Honduras and Nicaragua	0–1,700 metres (0–5,577 ft)
	Laelia schultzei (Schltr.) J.M.H.Shaw 2008	Colombia	
	Laelia speciosa (Kunth) Schltr. 1914	Mexico	1,400–2,400 metres (4,600–7,900 ft)
	Laelia splendida (Schltr.) L.O.Williams 1941	Colombia and Ecuador	600–3,300 metres (2,000–10,800 ft)
	Laelia superbiens Lindl. 1840	Mexico, Guatemala, Honduras and Nicaragua	800–2,000 metres (2,600–6,600 ft)
	Laelia undulata (Lindl.) L.O.Williams 1941	Costa Rica, Panama, Colombia, Peru, Trinidad, Venezuela	600–1,200 metres (2,000–3,900 ft)
	Laelia weberbaueriana (Kraenzl.) C.Schweinf. 1944	Peru and Bolivia	200–1,300 metres (660–4,270 ft)

== Ecology ==
Species in this genus are found in forests from sea level to mountain habitats above 2000 m. Species from above 2000 m of elevation like L. albida, and L. autumnalis are adapted to temperate climates and can be grown outdoors in places like the Mexican Plateau, California and other subtropical areas with cool summers.

Laelia is one of the orchid genera known to use crassulacean acid metabolism photosynthesis, which reduces evapotranspiration during daylight because carbon dioxide is collected at night.

== Cultivation ==
Laelias can be grown fastened to tree trunks, as long as the tree won't cast a deep shadow; they can also be fastened to a piece of branch or a slab of cork so they can be hung in a place facing south. The growing medium must have good drainage, rapidly drying after watering; pieces of pine bark, charcoal or pebbles are good choices. If grown mounted they definitely need approximately 50–70% humidity, while cooler temperatures increase the blooming process. Watering can be done 2–3 times a week, but with lower frequency in winter. Fertilization can be done with a very dilute solution, twice a month especially during growing season (May to November in Northern Hemisphere).

=== Nothogenera ===
Hybrids of Laelia with other orchid genera are placed in the following nothogenera (this list is incomplete):

- × Laeliocattleya (Lc.) = Cattleya × Laelia
- × Laeliocatonia (Lctna.) = Broughtonia × Cattleya × Laelia
- × Laeliocatarthron (Lcr.) = Cattleya × Caularthron × Laelia
- × Sophrolaelia (Sl.) = Laelia × Sophronitis

Rhyncholaelia is a distinct genus rather than a nothogenus.
