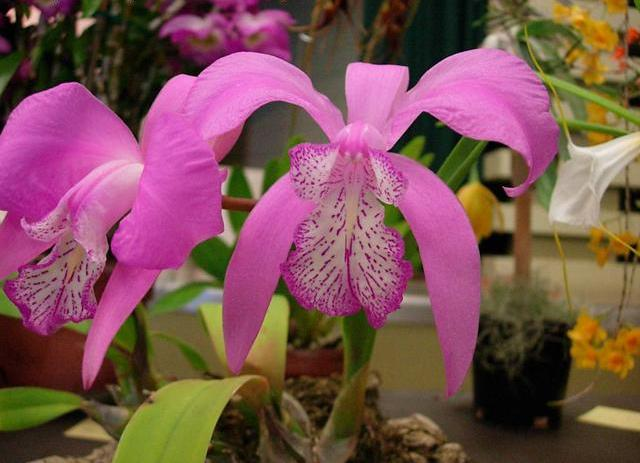

Conservation status
- CITES Appendix II

Scientific classification
- Kingdom: Plantae
- Clade: Tracheophytes
- Clade: Angiosperms
- Clade: Monocots
- Order: Asparagales
- Family: Orchidaceae
- Subfamily: Epidendroideae
- Genus: Laelia
- Species: L. speciosa

Binomial name
- Laelia speciosa (Kunth) Schltr.

Synonyms
- Bletia speciosa Kunth; Bletia grandiflora Lex.; Laelia grandiflora (Lex.) Lindl.; Cattleya grahamii Lindl.; Laelia majalis Lindl.; Amalia grandiflora (Lex.) Heynh.; Amalia majalis (Lindl.) Heynh.; Cattleya majalis (Lindl.) Beer; Laelia grandiflora var. alba Dimmock

= Laelia speciosa =

Mayflower orchid

Species of orchid

Laelia speciosa, also known as the Mayflower orchid, is a species of orchid from Mexico. It flowers between March and October, and has white-tipped purple blossoms.
