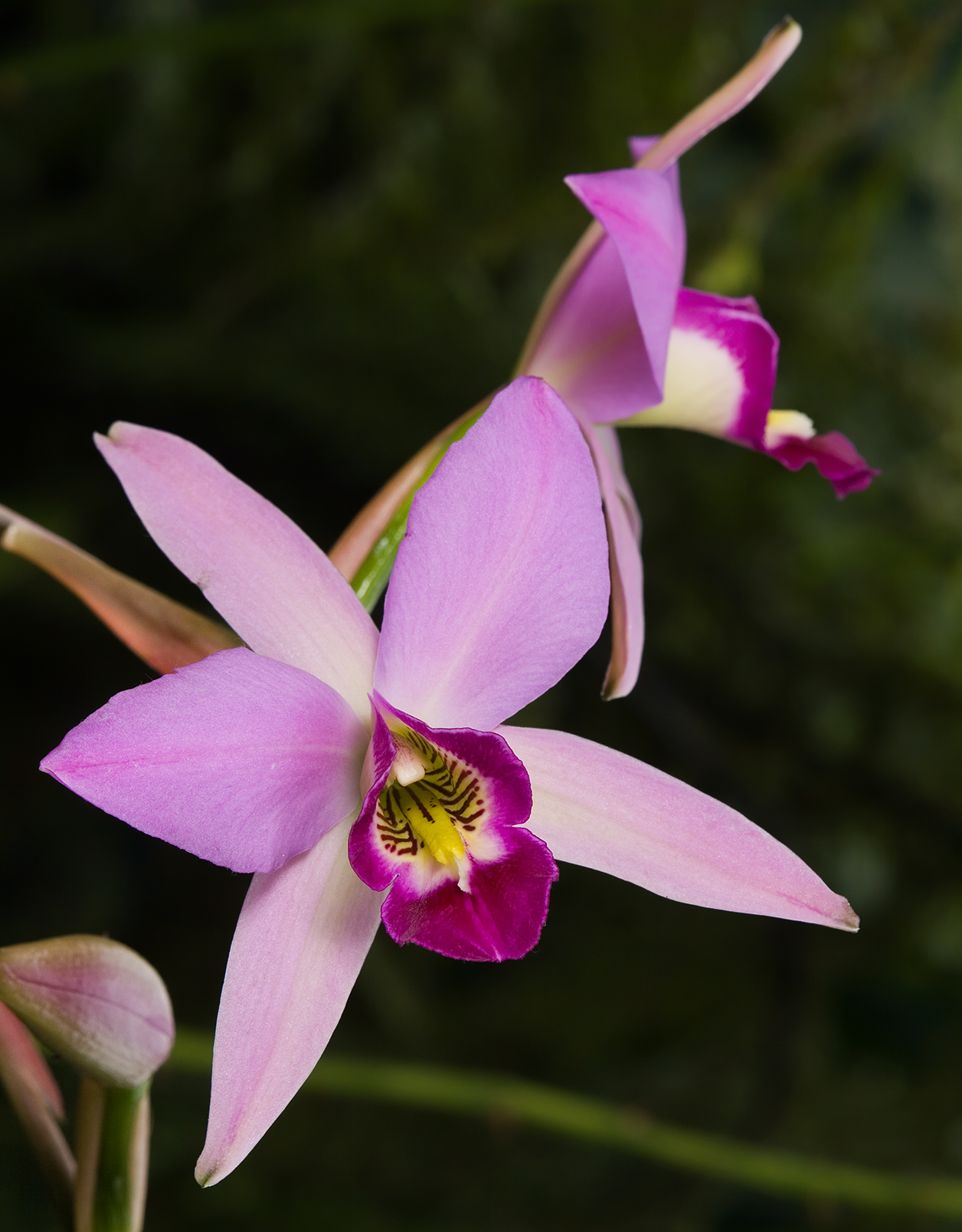

Scientific classification
- Kingdom: Plantae
- Clade: Tracheophytes
- Clade: Angiosperms
- Clade: Monocots
- Order: Asparagales
- Family: Orchidaceae
- Subfamily: Epidendroideae
- Genus: Laelia
- Species: L. gouldiana

Binomial name
- Laelia gouldiana Rchb.f.

= Laelia gouldiana =

Species of orchid

Laelia gouldiana is a plant of the orchid genus Laelia.

== Former distribution ==
The orchid, now is extinct in the wild, was endemic to the mountains of Hidalgo state and much of northeast Mexico. It grew as an epiphyte on trees in its native habitats at elevations of around 1550 metres.

== Cultivation ==
Laelia gouldiana is now only found and grown as a cultivated ornamental plant.

It can grow up to 1 metre (3.3 ft) tall and has pink flowers.

It prefers an extended dry period between waterings, cooler temperatures, and lower humidity than most Laelia species.
