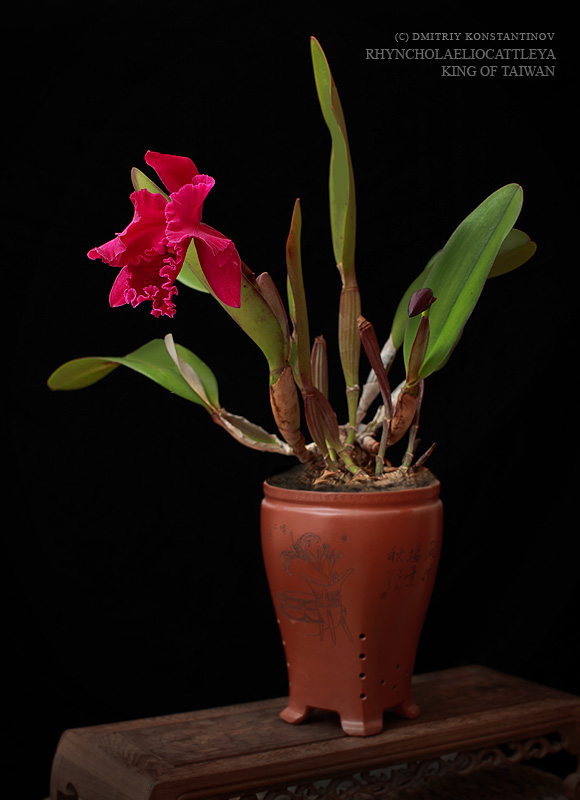
- × Rhyncholaeliocattleya 'King Of Taiwan'

Scientific classification
- Kingdom: Plantae
- Clade: Tracheophytes
- Clade: Angiosperms
- Clade: Monocots
- Order: Asparagales
- Family: Orchidaceae
- Subfamily: Epidendroideae
- Tribe: Epidendreae
- Subtribe: Laeliinae
- Genus: × Rhyncholaeliocattleya; H.G.Jones

Greges
- Many cultivars

= × Rhyncholaeliocattleya =

Genus of plants

× Rhyncholaeliocattleya, abbreviated Rlc. in the horticultural trade, is the orchid nothogenus for intergeneric hybrid greges containing at least one ancestor species from each of the two ancestral genera Rhyncholaelia Schltr. and Cattleya Lindl., and from no other genera.

The many greges in this nothogenus are among the most spectacular of cultivated orchids. Many are particularly valued for their large showy labellum. In publications prior to 2009, many of these were classified in various nothogenera, including × Brassocattleya, × Brassolaeliocattleya, × Brassolaelia, × Lowara, × Rhynchosophrocattleya, and × Potinara.
