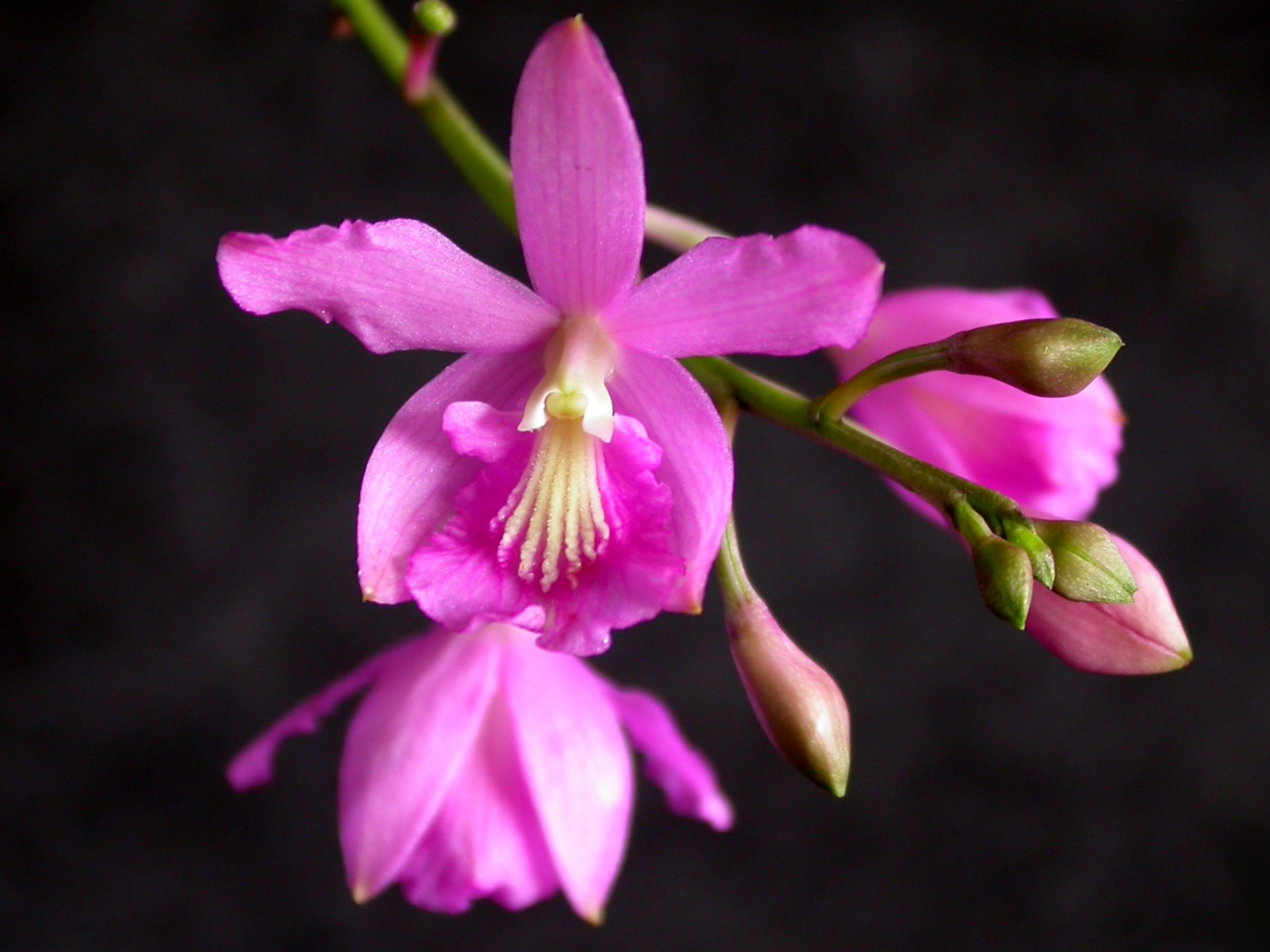
- Pseudolaelia corcovadensis

Scientific classification
- Kingdom: Plantae
- Clade: Embryophytes
- Clade: Tracheophytes
- Clade: Spermatophytes
- Clade: Angiosperms
- Clade: Monocots
- Order: Asparagales
- Family: Orchidaceae
- Subfamily: Epidendroideae
- Tribe: Epidendreae
- Subtribe: Laeliinae
- Genus: Pseudolaelia; Porto & Brade

Type species
- Pseudolaelia corcovadensis Porto & Brade

Synonyms
- Renata Ruschi

= Pseudolaelia =

Genus of orchids

Pseudolaelia is a small genus belonging to the orchid family (Orchidaceae), the entire genus endemic to Brazil. The abbreviation used in the horticultural trade is Pdla.

== Description ==
The flowers of these orchids resemble those of Laelia, but the main difference between these two genera lies in the vegetative part.

These orchids occur exclusively in Eastern Brazil, often as epiphytes. Some are lithophytes, forming a thicket on the rocks. Others, as Pseudolaelia vellozicola, are semi-epiphytes and can be found on mat-like communities of Vellozia bushes on inselbergs (dome-shaped granitic or gneissic rock outcrops) in the Brazilian Atlantic rainforest, requiring an adaptation to the extreme environmental conditions (dryness, isolation)

The rhizomes are extended. The pseudobulbs are fusiform, cylindrical to conical, carrying three to eight leaves. These are apical, deciduous, upright, leathery and pointy. The base of the leaves clasps the pseudobulb from the upper third till the apex.

The inflorescence is a long raceme, growing from the apex of the pseudobulb, with an undefined number of small white to pink flowers, opening in a consecutive manner clustered at the apex.

Pollination is performed by hummingbirds, butterflies, dipterids and hymenopterids. The flowers of Pseudolaelia corcovadensis, being self-compatible, are also pollinated by deceit by the bee Bombus (Fervidobombus) atratus by mimicking a generalized bee-attracting food-flower. However, these visits are rather rare

== Species of Pseudolaelia ==
Species accepted as of June 2014:

Image	Name	Distribution	Elevation (m)
	Pseudolaelia aromatica Campacci	Minas Gerais	around 490 meters
	Pseudolaelia ataleiensis Campacci	Minas Gerais	around 280 meters
	Pseudolaelia brejetubensis M.Frey	Espírito Santo	1100 – 1400 meters
	Pseudolaelia calimaniorum V.P.Castro & Chiron	Espírito Santo	1000 – 1400 meters
	Pseudolaelia canaanensis (Ruschi) F.Barros	Espírito Santo	300 – 1000 meters
	Pseudolaelia cipoensis Pabst	Serra do Cipó	around 1400 meters
	Pseudolaelia citrina Pabst	Minas Gerais, Espírito Santo	around 1200 meters
	Pseudolaelia corcovadensis Porto & Brade	Rio de Janeiro	500 – 900 meters
	Pseudolaelia dutraei Ruschi	Espírito Santo	400 - 700 metrers
	Pseudolaelia freyi Chiron & V.P.Castro	Espírito Santo	1100 – 1400 meters
	Pseudolaelia geraensis Pabst	Minas Gerais	
	Pseudolaelia irwiniana Pabst	Serra do Espinhaço	around 900 meters
	Pseudolaelia maquijiensis M.Frey	Espírito Santo	around 700 meters
	Pseudolaelia oliveirana V.P.Castro & Chiron	Espírito Santo	400 – 600 meters
	Pseudolaelia pavopolitana M.Frey	Espírito Santo	around 350 meters
	Pseudolaelia pitengoensis Campacci	Minas Gerais	around 600 meters
	Pseudolaelia regentii V.P.Castro & Marçal	Bahia	
	Pseudolaelia vellozicola (Hoehne) Porto & Brade	Bahia, Espírito Santo	1000 – 1400 meters

=== Natural hybrids ===
- Pseudolaelia × perimii M.Frey - Espírito Santo (P. brejetubensis × P. freyi)

== Books ==
- Chiron, G.; Roquenant, C. (2000). Laelia et genres alliés. Brassavola, Cattleya, Pseudolaelia, Rhyncholaelia et Schomburgkia. (in French)
