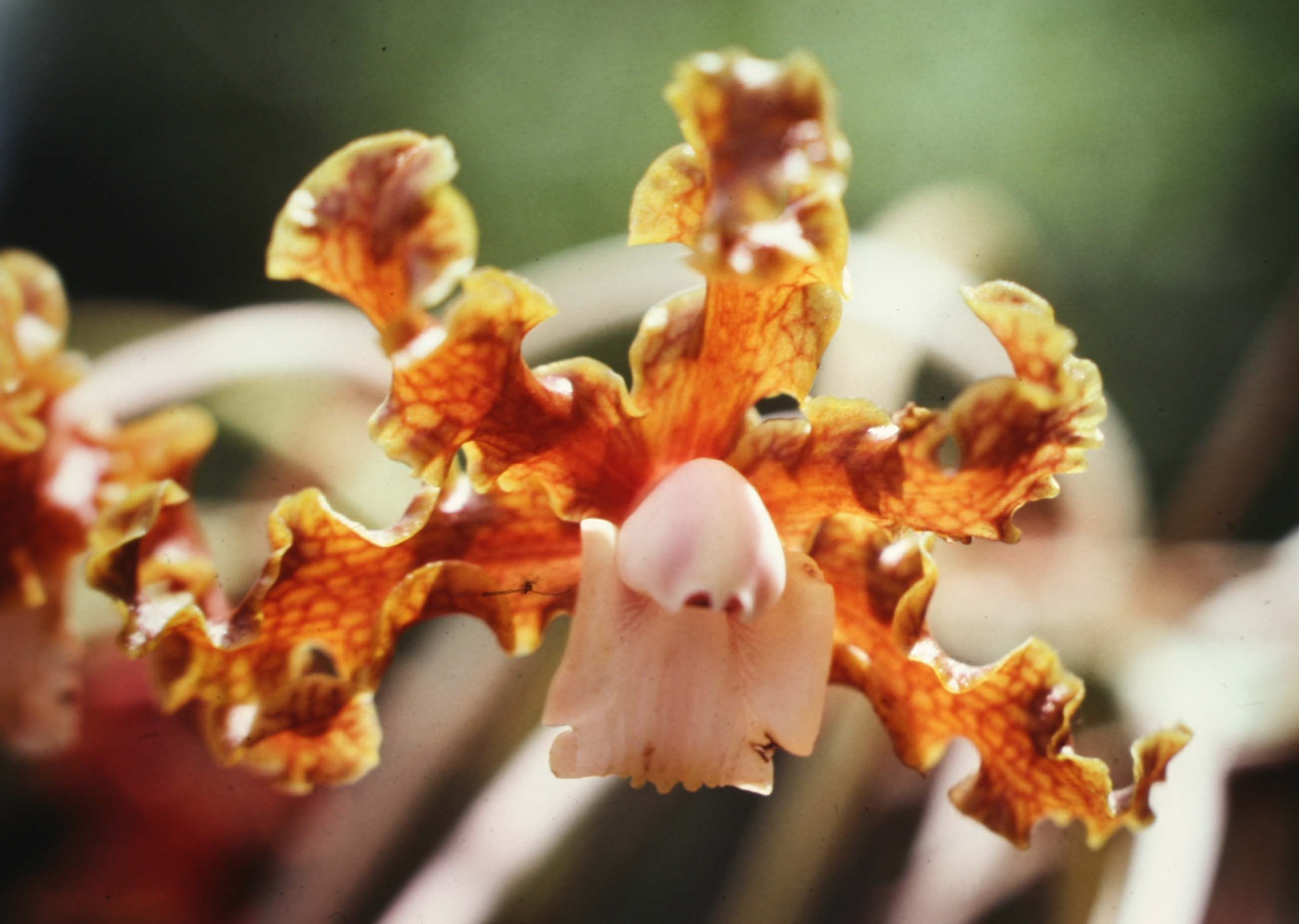

Scientific classification
- Kingdom: Plantae
- Clade: Tracheophytes
- Clade: Angiosperms
- Clade: Monocots
- Order: Asparagales
- Family: Orchidaceae
- Subfamily: Epidendroideae
- Genus: Laelia
- Species: L. marginata

Binomial name
- Laelia marginata Lindl.

= Laelia marginata =

Species of orchid

Laelia marginata is a species of orchid in the genus Laelia. Laelia marginata is found in Suriname.
