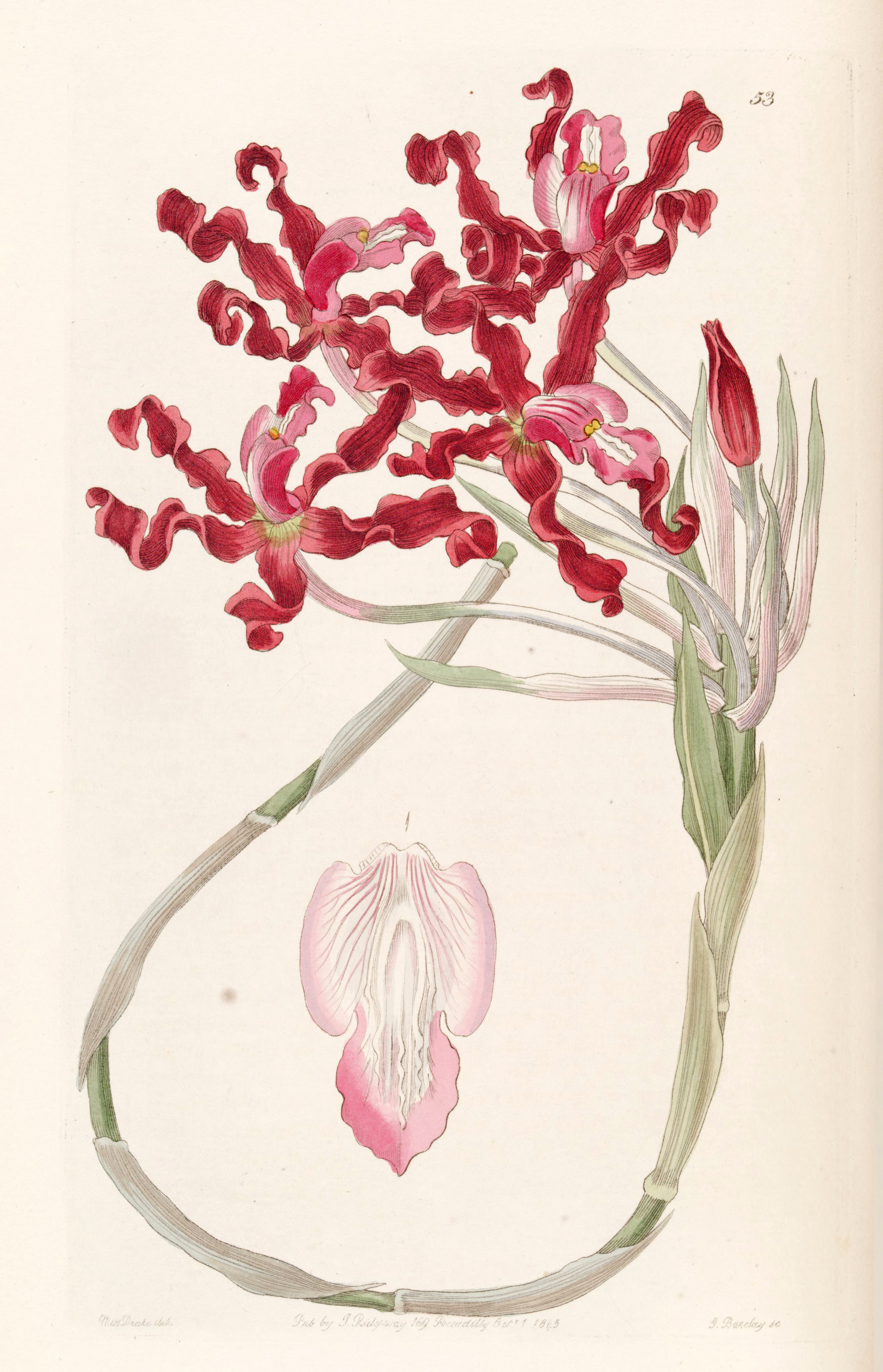

Scientific classification
- Kingdom: Plantae
- Clade: Tracheophytes
- Clade: Angiosperms
- Clade: Monocots
- Order: Asparagales
- Family: Orchidaceae
- Subfamily: Epidendroideae
- Genus: Laelia
- Species: L. undulata

Binomial name
- Laelia undulata (Lindl.) L.O.Williams

Synonyms
- Schomburgkia undulata Lindl. (basionym); Schomburgkia violacea Paxton; Cattleya undulata Beer; Bletia undulata (Lindl.) Rchb.f.

= Laelia undulata =

Species of orchid

Laelia undulata is a species of orchid native to Colombia, Trinidad and Venezuela.
