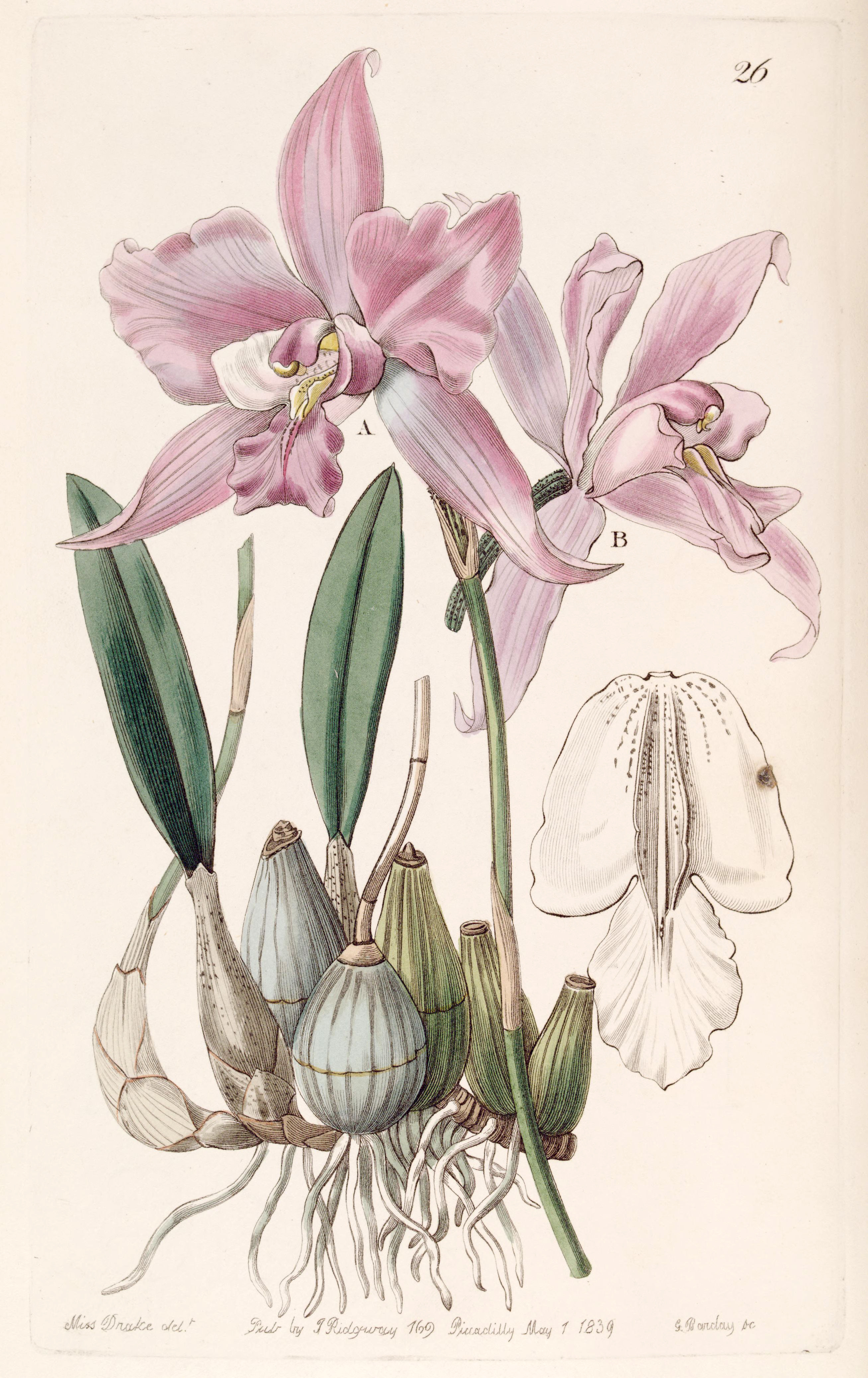

Scientific classification
- Kingdom: Plantae
- Clade: Embryophytes
- Clade: Tracheophytes
- Clade: Angiosperms
- Clade: Monocots
- Order: Asparagales
- Family: Orchidaceae
- Subfamily: Epidendroideae
- Genus: Laelia
- Species: L. furfuracea

Binomial name
- Laelia furfuracea Lindl.

Synonyms
- Amalia furfuracea (Lindl.) Heynh.; Cattleya furfuracea (Lindl.) Beer; Bletia furfuracea (Lindl.) Rchb.f.

= Laelia furfuracea =

Species of orchid

Laelia furfuracea is a species of orchid endemic to Mexico (Oaxaca).
