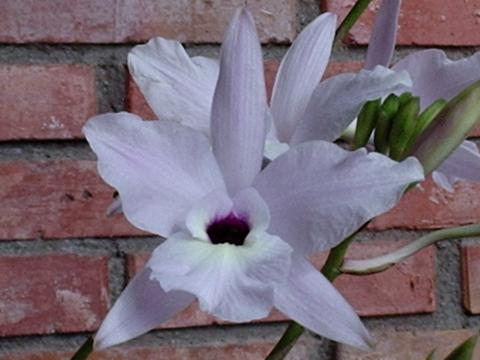

Scientific classification
- Kingdom: Plantae
- Clade: Tracheophytes
- Clade: Angiosperms
- Clade: Monocots
- Order: Asparagales
- Family: Orchidaceae
- Subfamily: Epidendroideae
- Genus: Laelia
- Species: L. rubescens

Binomial name
- Laelia rubescens Lindl.

Synonyms
- See text

= Laelia rubescens =

Species of orchid

Laelia rubescens is a species of orchid native to Mexico and Central America.

== Distribution ==
Laelia rubescens is native to the Central American countries Belize, Costa Rica, El Salvador, Guatemala, Honduras, Nicaragua and much of Southern/Central Mexico. It also occurs in the wild in Florida and Cuba as an escapee from cultivation, having been intentionally introduced as an ornamental plant. Laelia rubescens grows in seasonally dry, deciduous forests as an epiphyte and occasionally as a lithophyte at elevations below 1700 meters.

== Synonyms ==
- Amalia rubescens (Lindl.) Heynh.
- Cattleya rubescens (Lindl.) Beer
- Bletia rubescens (Lindl.) Rchb.f.
- Laelia acuminata Lindl.
- Laelia peduncularis Lindl.
- Amalia acuminata (Lindl.) Heynh.
- Amalia peduncularis (Lindl.) Heynh.
- Laelia pubescens Lem.
- Laelia violacea Rchb.f.
- Cattleya acuminata (Lindl.) Beer
- Cattleya peduncularis (Lindl.) Beer
- Bletia peduncularis (Lindl.) Rchb.f.
- Bletia violacea (Rchb.f.) Rchb.f.
- Bletia acuminata (Lindl.) Rchb.f.
- Laelia inconspicua H.G. Jones
- Laelia rubescens f. peduncularis (Lindl.) Halb.
