= John Nugent Fitch =

British lithographer and botanical illustrator

- Born: 24 October 1840
- Died: 11 January 1927 (aged 86)
- Known for: botanical illustration and lithography

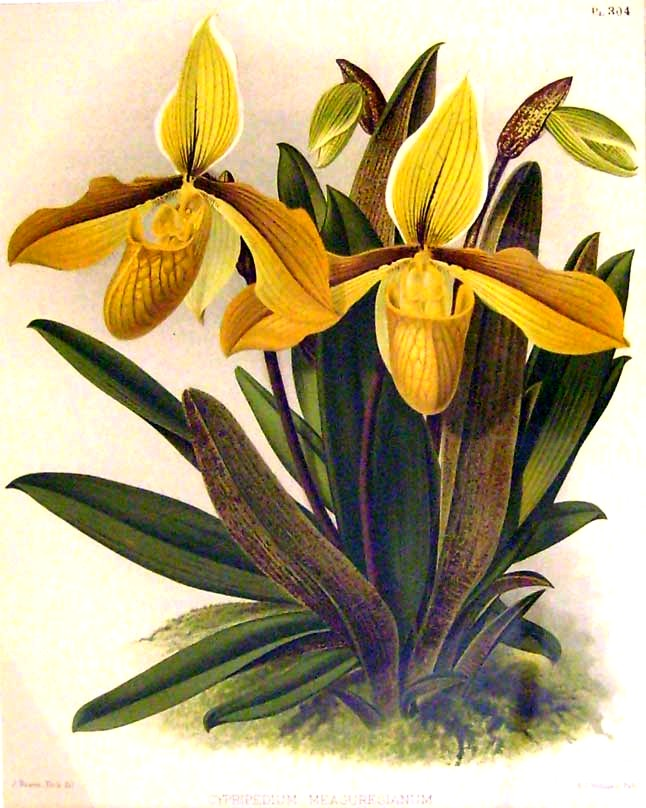
Cypripedium measuresianum

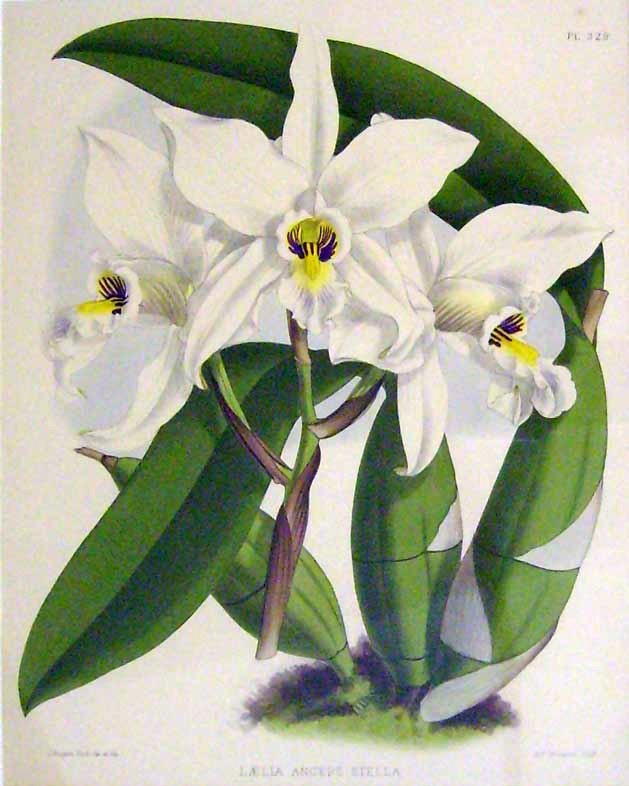
Laelia anceps stella

John Nugent Fitch (24 October 1840 – 11 January 1927) was a British botanical illustrator and lithographer, best known for his contribution of 528 plates to The Orchid Album, a landmark work of eleven volumes published between 1872 and 1897. Fitch was the nephew of botanical artist Walter Hood Fitch (1817–1892). Fitch also contributed to Curtis's Botanical Magazine from 1878, joining a select group of illustrators such as William Kilburn, James Sowerby, Sydenham Edwards, William Jackson Hooker and Walter Hood Fitch. Fitch also produced plates for Lepidoptera Indica by Frederic Moore. He was also employed by Trevor Lawrence to paint pictures of his orchids.

Fitch was elected a fellow of the Linnean Society in 1877.
