= Laelia gloriosa =

Scientific classification
- Kingdom: Plantae
- Clade: Tracheophytes
- Clade: Angiosperms
- Clade: Monocots
- Order: Asparagales
- Family: Orchidaceae
- Subfamily: Epidendroideae
- Genus: Laelia
- Species: L. gloriosa

Binomial name
- Laelia gloriosa Lindl.

Synonyms
- Schomburgkia crispa Lindl.; Cattleya crispa (Lindl.) Beer; Bletia crispina (Lindl.) Rchb.f.

Species of orchid

Laelia gloriosa is a species of orchid native to tropical South America.
