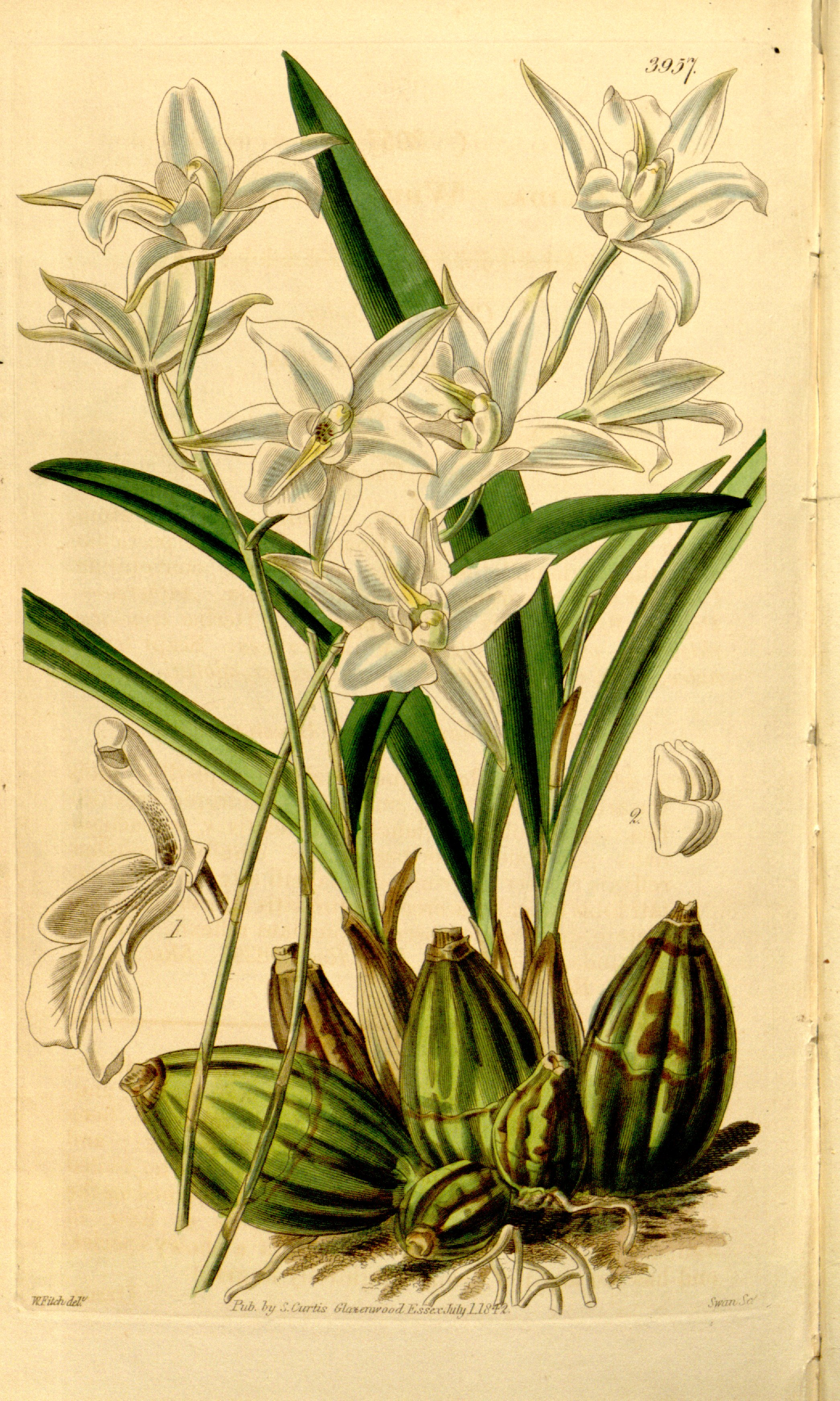
- Laelia albida, Illustration.

Scientific classification
- Kingdom: Plantae
- Clade: Tracheophytes
- Clade: Angiosperms
- Clade: Monocots
- Order: Asparagales
- Family: Orchidaceae
- Subfamily: Epidendroideae
- Genus: Laelia
- Species: L. albida

Binomial name
- Laelia albida Bateman ex Lindl.

Synonyms
- Laelia discolor A.Rich. & Galeotti; Laelia candida Lodd. ex W. Baxter; Amalia albida (Bateman ex Lindl.) Heynh.; Cattleya albida (Bateman ex Lindl.) Beer; Bletia albida (Bateman ex Lindl.) Rchb.f.

= Laelia albida =

Species of orchid

Laelia albida is the most northerly-growing laelia in Mexico. This epiphytic orchid bears ten or more small (5 cm) pale pink flowers on a half-meter terminal inflorescence in late winter to early spring. It is cold-tolerant close to freezing in the winter and needs to be kept dry until new vegetative growth is seen in late spring. It seems to do much better mounted on cork or hardwood than potted.

The diploid chromosome number of L. albida has been determined as 2n = 42 and as 2n = ~63.
