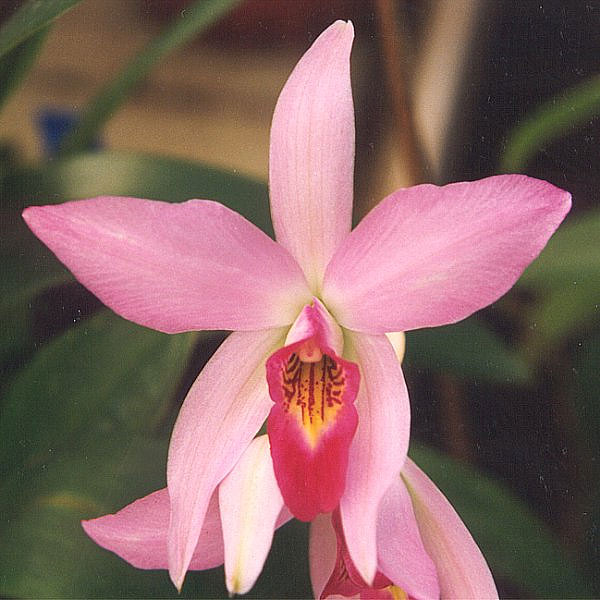

Scientific classification
- Kingdom: Plantae
- Clade: Tracheophytes
- Clade: Angiosperms
- Clade: Monocots
- Order: Asparagales
- Family: Orchidaceae
- Subfamily: Epidendroideae
- Genus: Laelia
- Species: L. anceps

Binomial name
- Laelia anceps Lindl.

Synonyms
- Amalias anceps (Lindl.) Hoffmanns.; Amalia anceps (Lindl.) Heynh.; Cattleya anceps (Lindl.) Beer; Bletia anceps (Lindl.) Rchb.f.

= Laelia anceps =

Species of orchid

Laelia anceps is a species of orchid found in Mexico and Guatemala.

== Subspecies ==
- Laelia anceps ssp. anceps (Mexico to Guatemala). The diploid chromosome number of L. anceps ssp. anceps has been determined as 2n = 40
- Laelia anceps ssp. dawsonii (J.Anderson) Rolfe (Mexico - Guerrero, Oaxaca). The diploid chromosome number of L. anceps ssp. dawsonii has been determined as 2n = 40.
