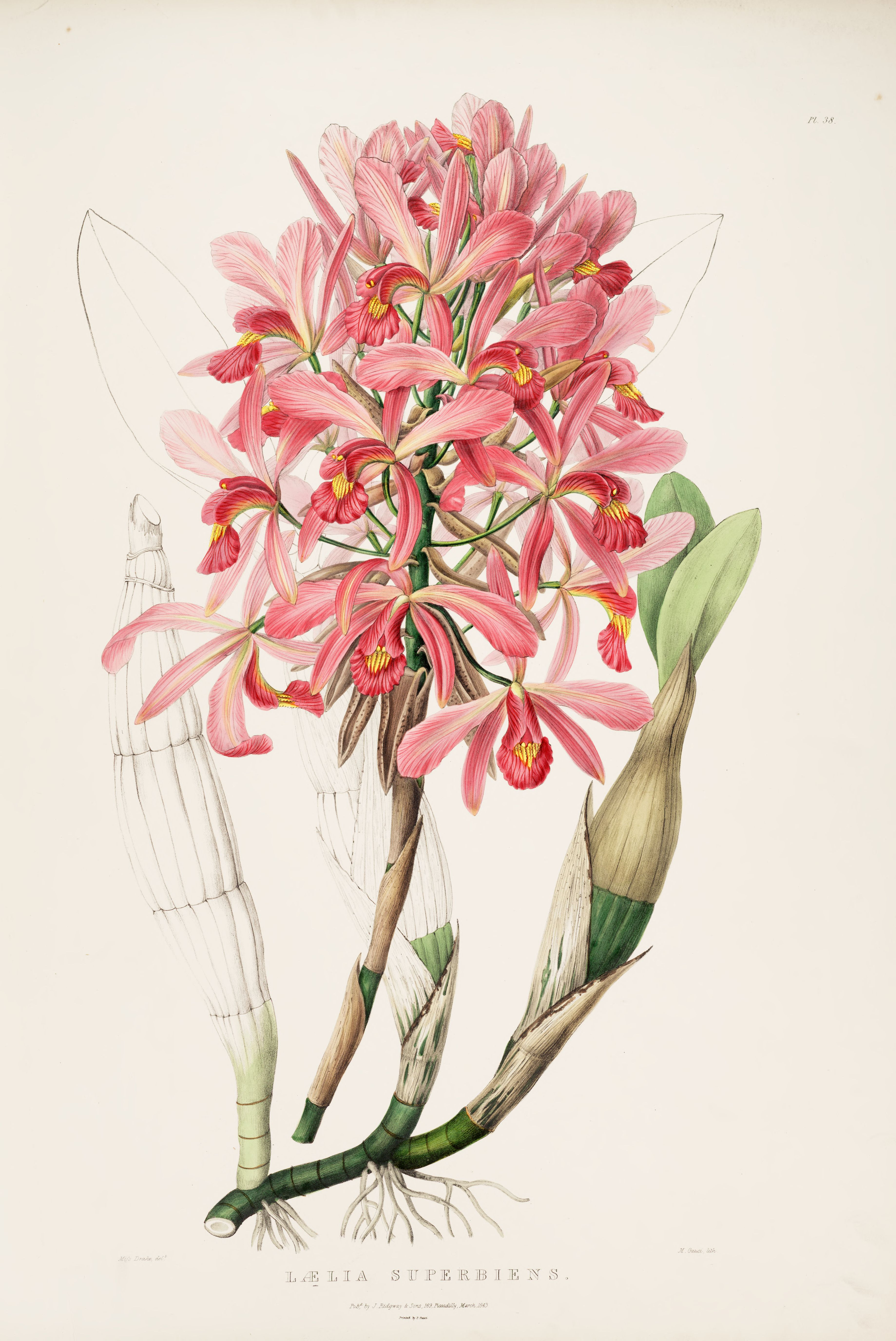

Scientific classification
- Kingdom: Plantae
- Clade: Tracheophytes
- Clade: Angiosperms
- Clade: Monocots
- Order: Asparagales
- Family: Orchidaceae
- Subfamily: Epidendroideae
- Genus: Laelia
- Species: L. superbiens

Binomial name
- Laelia superbiens Lindl.

Synonyms
- Amalia superbiens (Lindl.) Heynh.; Cattleya superbiens (Lindl.) Beer; Bletia superbiens (Lindl.) Rchb.f.; Laelia superbiens var. decorata Rchb.f.; Laelia superbiens var. quesneliana R. Warner & B.S. Williams; Schomburgkia superbiens (Lindl.) Rolfe

= Laelia superbiens =

Species of orchid

Laelia superbiens is a species of orchid native to Mexico, Guatemala and Honduras.
