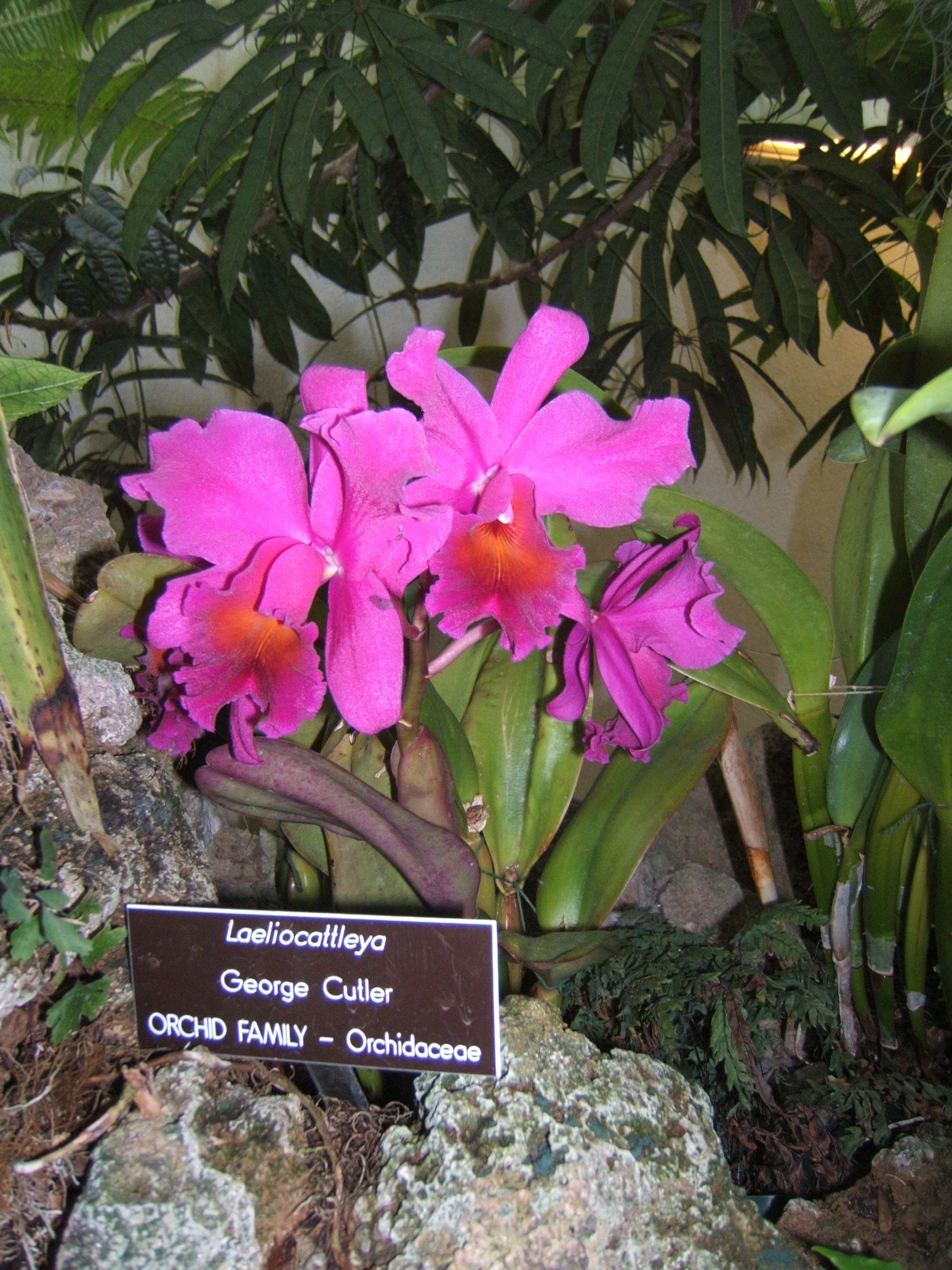
- C. George Cutler = C. Mary Rose × C. Manila as Lc. George Cutler

Scientific classification
- Kingdom: Plantae
- Clade: Tracheophytes
- Clade: Angiosperms
- Clade: Monocots
- Order: Asparagales
- Family: Orchidaceae
- Subfamily: Epidendroideae
- Tribe: Epidendreae
- Subtribe: Laeliinae
- Genus: × Laeliocattleya; Rolfe

= × Laeliocattleya =

Genus of orchids

Laeliocattleya is a nothogenus of intergeneric orchid hybrids descended from the parental genera Laelia and Cattleya. It is abbreviated Lc. in the horticultural trade.

Due to the recent decision by the Royal Horticultural Society (the international orchid registration authority) to recognize the reduction of the Brazilian Laelia species and the entire genus Sophronitis to synonymy under Cattleya, many hybrids which had previously been described as Laeliocattleya hybrids are now classified as Cattleya hybrids (e.g. C. George Cutler). The nothogenus name × Sophrolaelia (for hybrids between Sophronitis and Laelia) is now a synonym of × Laeliocattleya.

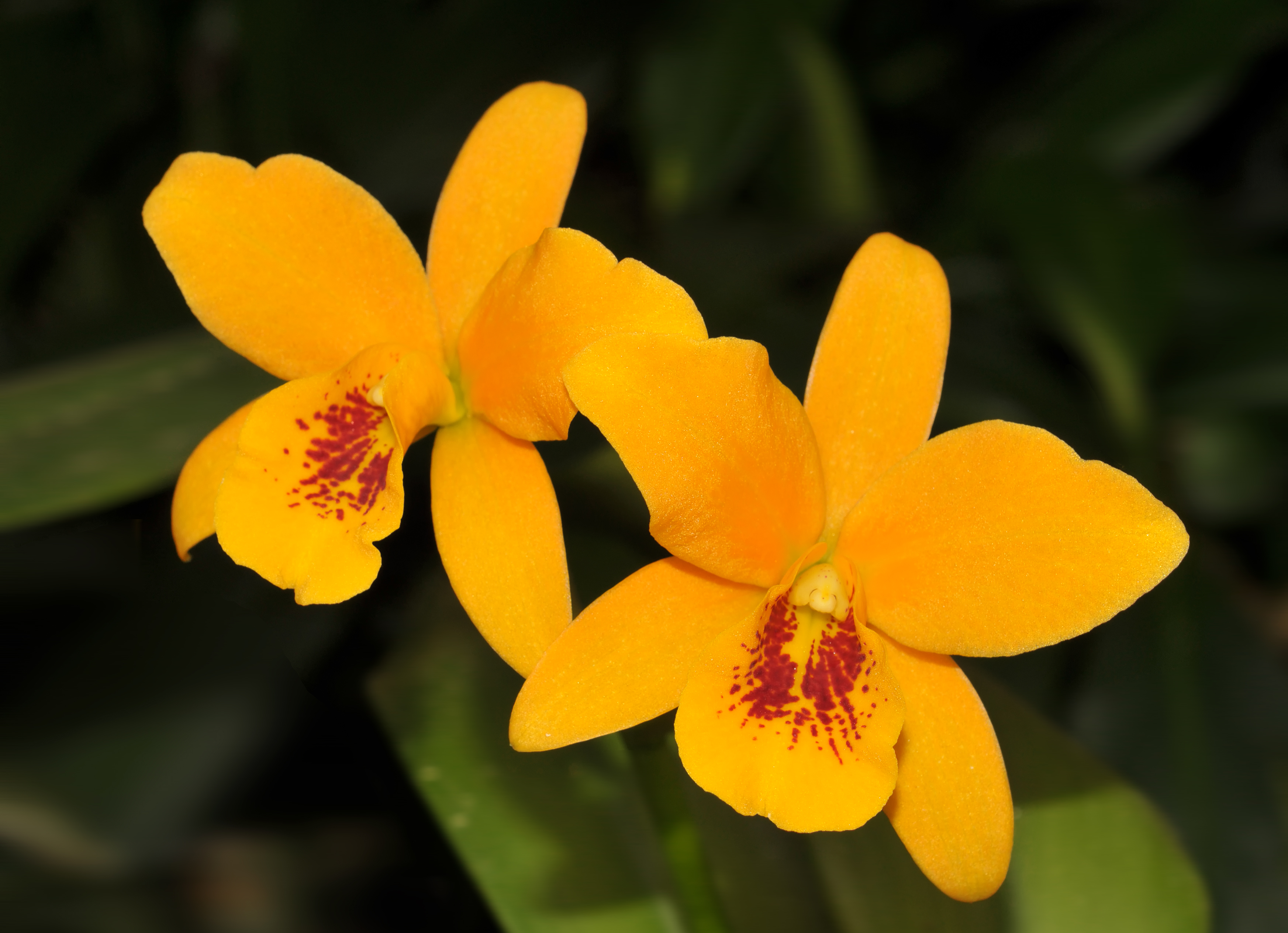
Flowers of the Laeliocattleya (syn. Cattlianthe) Gold Digger 'Butter cup'.

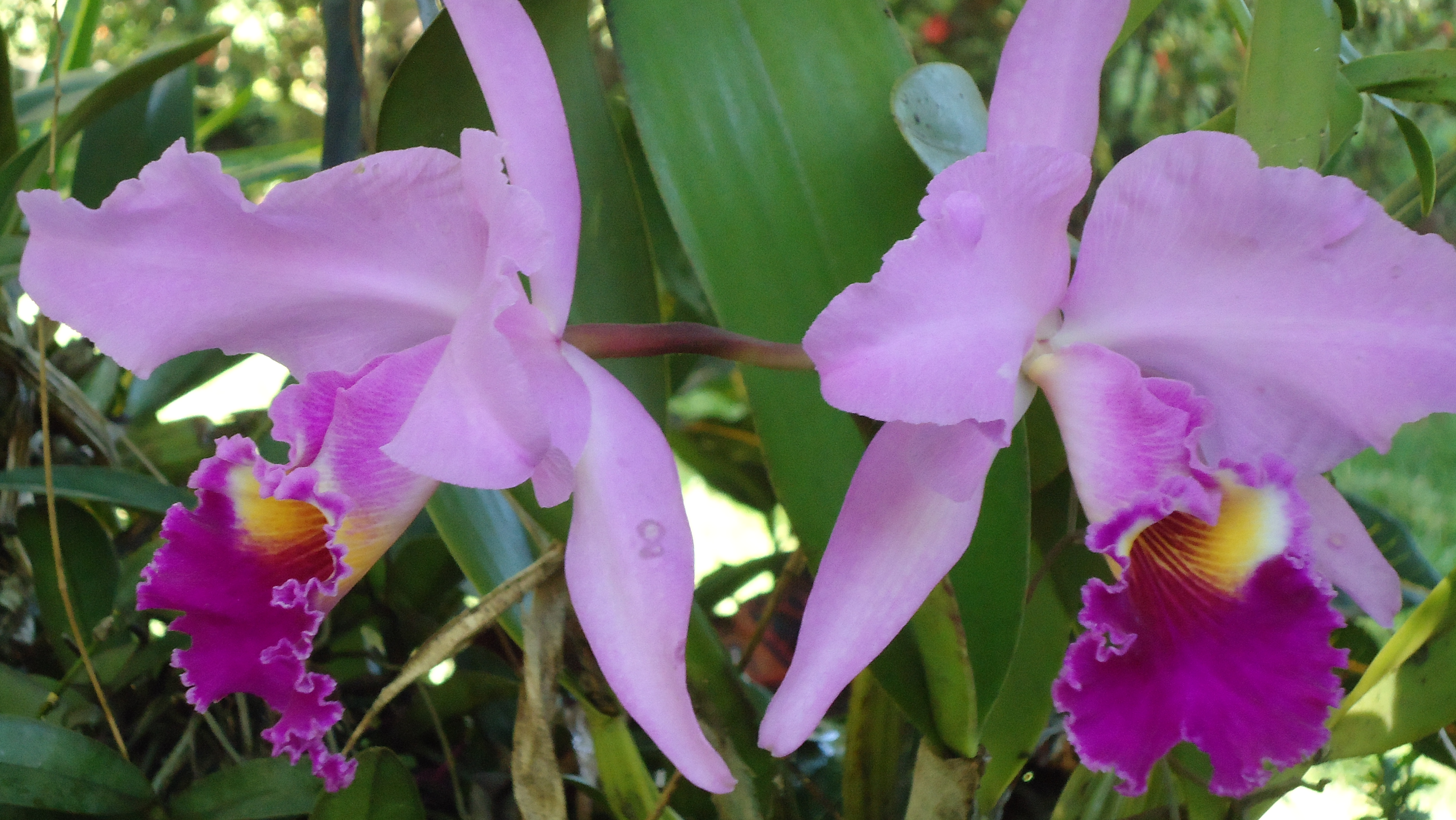
Flowers of the Laeliocattleya (syn. Cattleya) Anna Ingham.

== List of grexes ==
- Laeliocattleya (syn. Cattleya) Anna Ingham – Has flowers that range from dark reddish purple to deep mauve. The lip is darker colored and the lip is veined with gold. They can bear up to five flowers, each 6 to 7 inches wide.
- Laeliocattleya (syn. Cattleya) Derna – Has flowers that are yellow. The lip is purple and is streaked with gold. The can bear up to six flowers, each 5 inches wide.
- Laeliocattleya (syn. Cattleya) Dorset Gold – Has flowers with yellow petals edged with crimson. The lip is ruffled and is red-purple, with gold streaks along the throat.
- Laeliocattleya Puppy Love – Has soft shell pink flowers. This is a true Laeliocattleya unlike others above.

== See also ==
- Laelia
- Sophronitis
- Cattleya
