= Labellum (botany) =

Botanical term

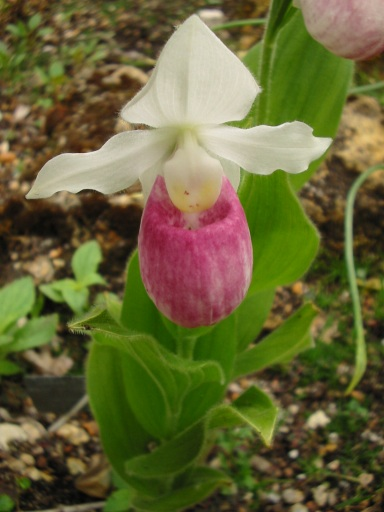
Showy lady slipper (Cypripedium reginae) has a pink labellum

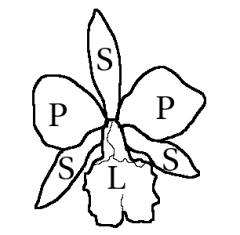
P: Petalum S: Sepalum L: Labellum

In botany, the labellum (or lip) is the part of the flower of an orchid or Canna, or other less-known genera, that serves to attract insects, which pollinate the flower, and acts as a landing platform for them.

Labellum (plural: labella) is the Latin diminutive of labrum, meaning lip.

The labellum is a modified petal and can be distinguished from the other petals and from the sepals by its large size and its often irregular shape. It is not unusual for the other two petals of an orchid flower to look like the sepals, so that the labellum stands out as distinct.

In orchids, the labellum is the modified median petal that sits opposite from the fertile anther and usually highly modified from the other perianth segments. It is often united with the column and can be hinged or movable, facilitating pollination. Often, the orchid labellum is divided into three or more lobes. Some have modified fleshy lumps on the upper surface generally referred to as the callus (plural: calli), with some being divided into multiple ridges or a central keel. When the callus is flat and broad, it is sometimes called a plate, which can have fringed margins. The callus can be highly modified with striking colors that may aid in pollinator deceit and mimicry.

The labellum in orchids is often large and complex enough that terminology describing relative positions for structures on it becomes useful: the hypochile is the basal portion nearer the connection with the rest of the flower, the mesochile is the middle portion, and the epichile is the distal portion.

== Gallery ==
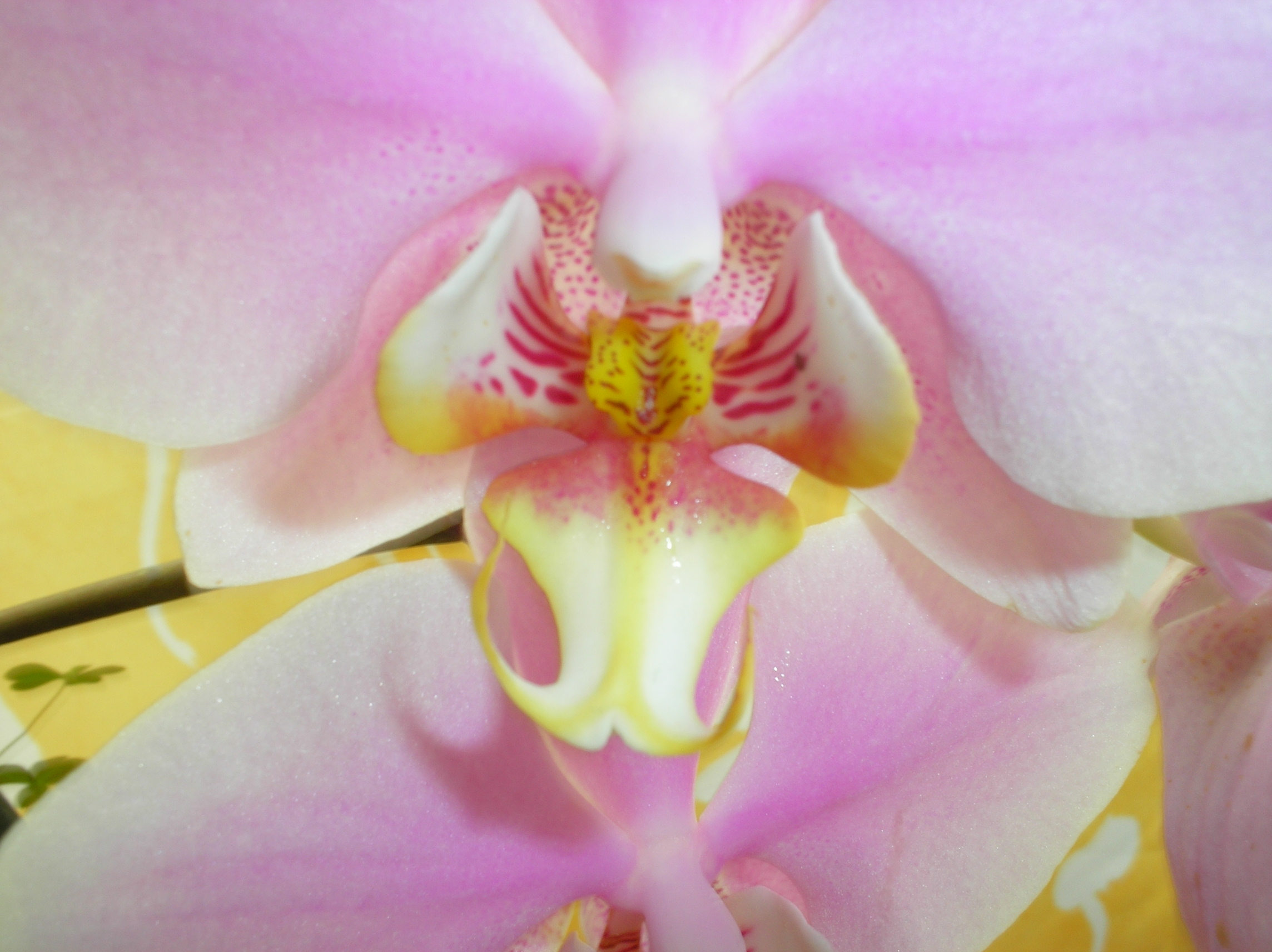
Labellum of a Phalaenopsis hybrid

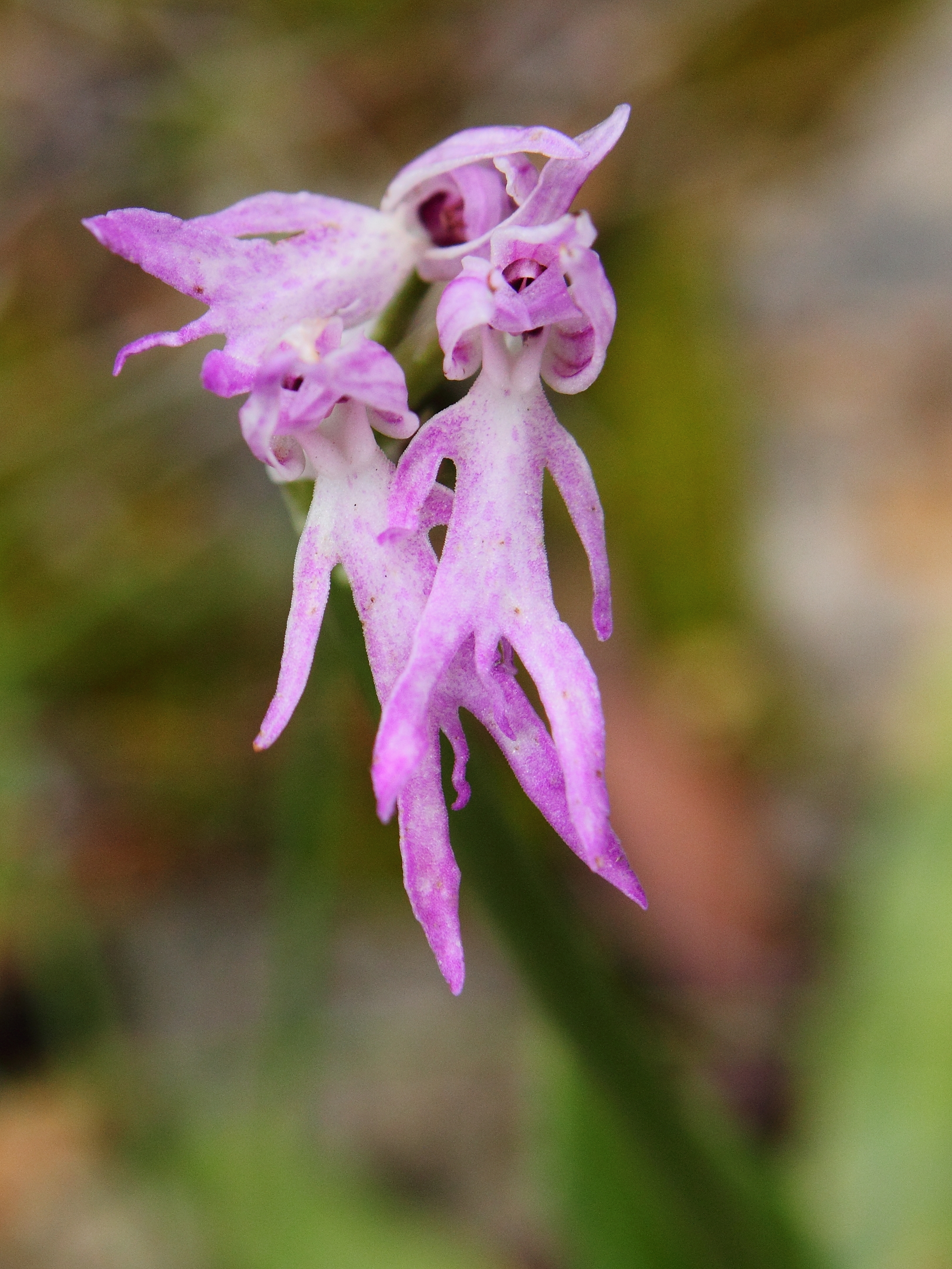
Orchis italica, the naked man orchid, showing a labellum divided into several lobes

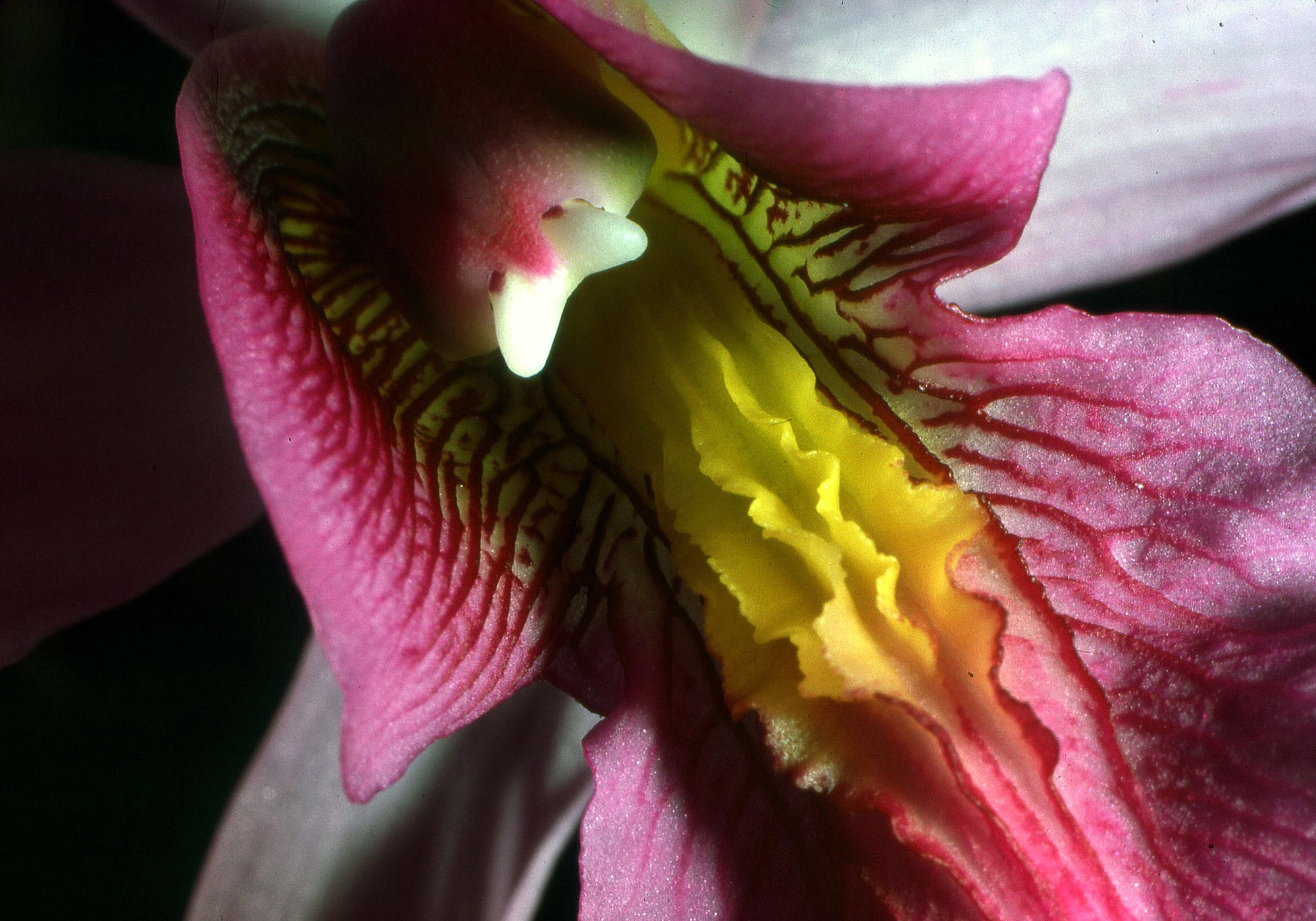
Labellum of the orchid Laelia superbiens, showing five wavy ridges of the callus

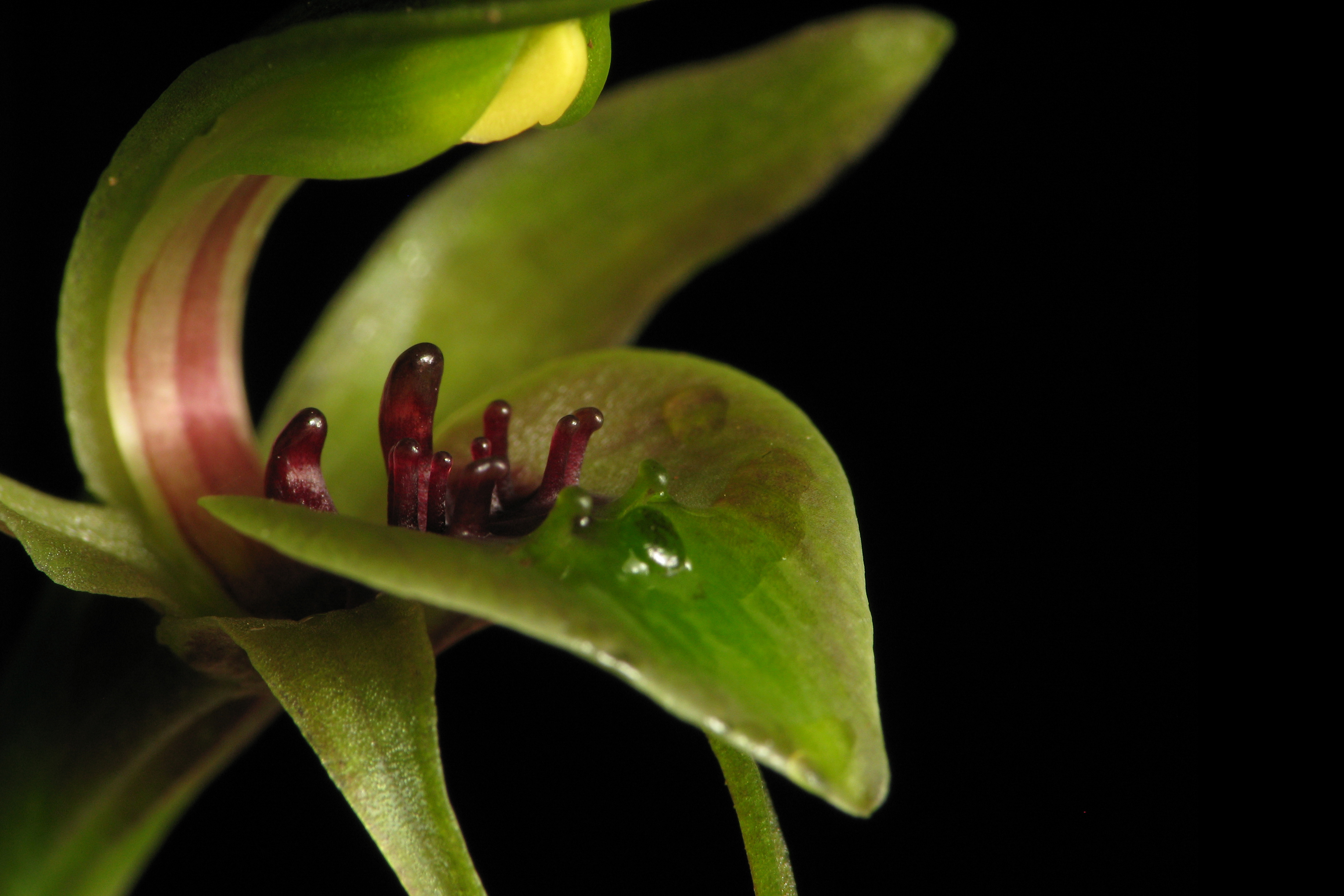
Labellum with highly modified calli in a species of Chiloglottis

== See also ==
- Glossary of botanical terms
