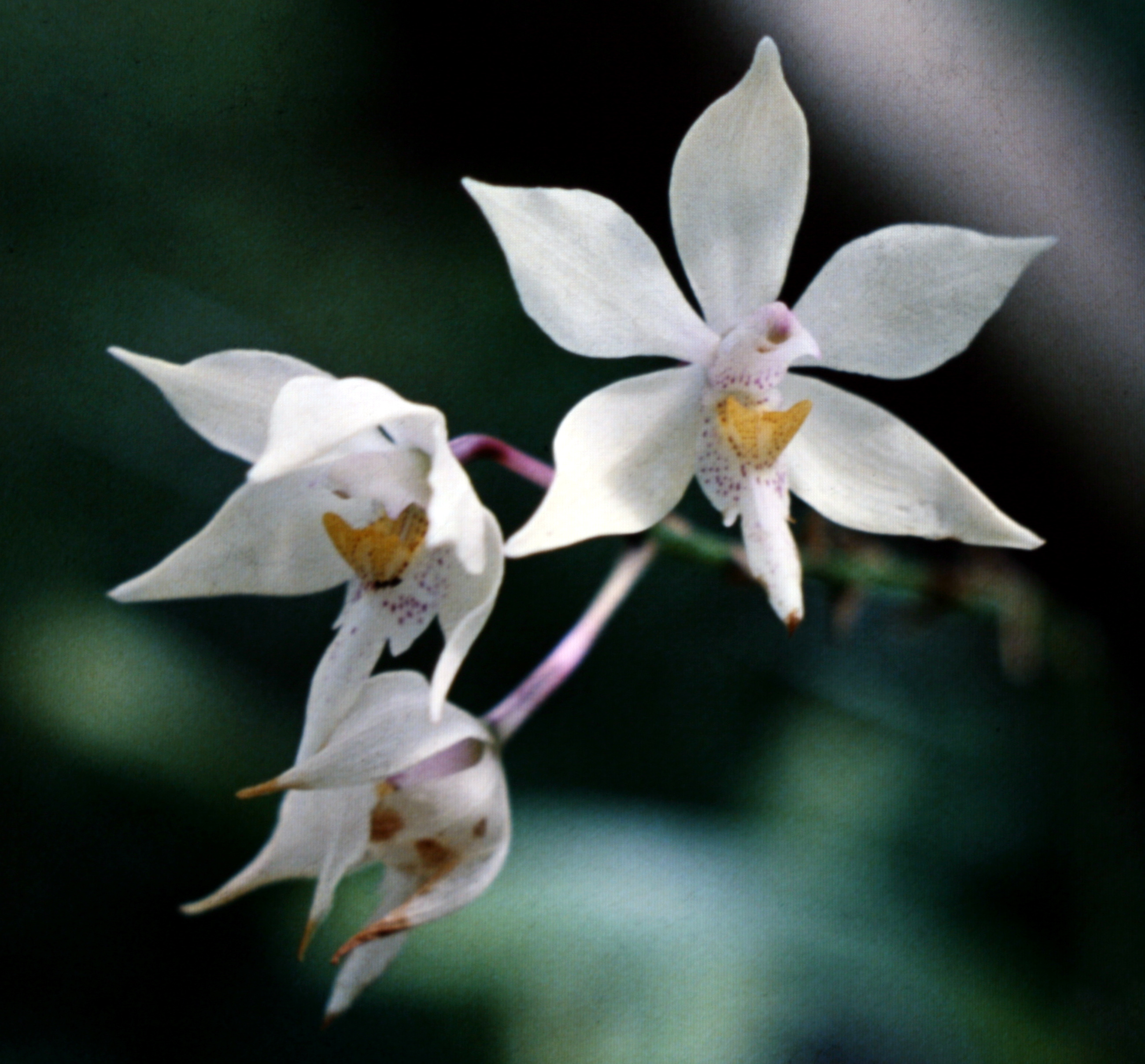
- Caularthron bicornutum

Scientific classification
- Kingdom: Plantae
- Clade: Tracheophytes
- Clade: Angiosperms
- Clade: Monocots
- Order: Asparagales
- Family: Orchidaceae
- Subfamily: Epidendroideae
- Tribe: Epidendreae
- Subtribe: Laeliinae
- Genus: Caularthron; Raf. (1837)

Synonyms
- Diacrium Benth.

= Caularthron =

Genus of orchids

Caularthron Raf. (1837), abbreviated Cau. in the horticultural trade, is a genus of orchids with 4 species. They are epiphytic orchids with specialized hollow pseudobulbs that house ants. The genus is exclusively found in the tropical regions of southern Mexico, Central America, the West Indies, and northern South America.

== List of species ==
Species accepted as of May 2014:

Image	Name	Distribution	Elevation (m)
	Caularthron amazonicum (Schltr.) H.G.Jones (1968)	Trinidad, Venezuela, Brazil	
	Caularthron bicornutum (Hook.) Raf. (1837) 2n = 40, n = 20.	Trinidad-Tobago, Venezuela, Brazil, Suriname, Guyana, Colombia	
	Caularthron bilamellatum (Rchb.f.) R.E.Schult. (1958)	Belize, Central America, northern South America (Roraima, Venezuela, Colombia, Ecuador), Trinidad, Chiapas	0 - 700
	Caularthron kraenzlinianum H.G.Jones (1980)	Windward Islands	
