= Laelia rosea (plant) =

Scientific classification
- Kingdom: Plantae
- Clade: Embryophytes
- Clade: Tracheophytes
- Clade: Spermatophytes
- Clade: Angiosperms
- Clade: Monocots
- Order: Asparagales
- Family: Orchidaceae
- Subfamily: Epidendroideae
- Genus: Laelia
- Species: L. rosea

Binomial name
- Laelia rosea (Linden ex Lindl.) C.Schweinf.

Synonyms
- Bletia rosea (Linden ex Lindl.) Rchb.f.; Schomburgkia rosea Linden ex Lindl.

Species of orchid

Laelia rosea is a species of orchid native to Colombia, Venezuela and Guyana.
