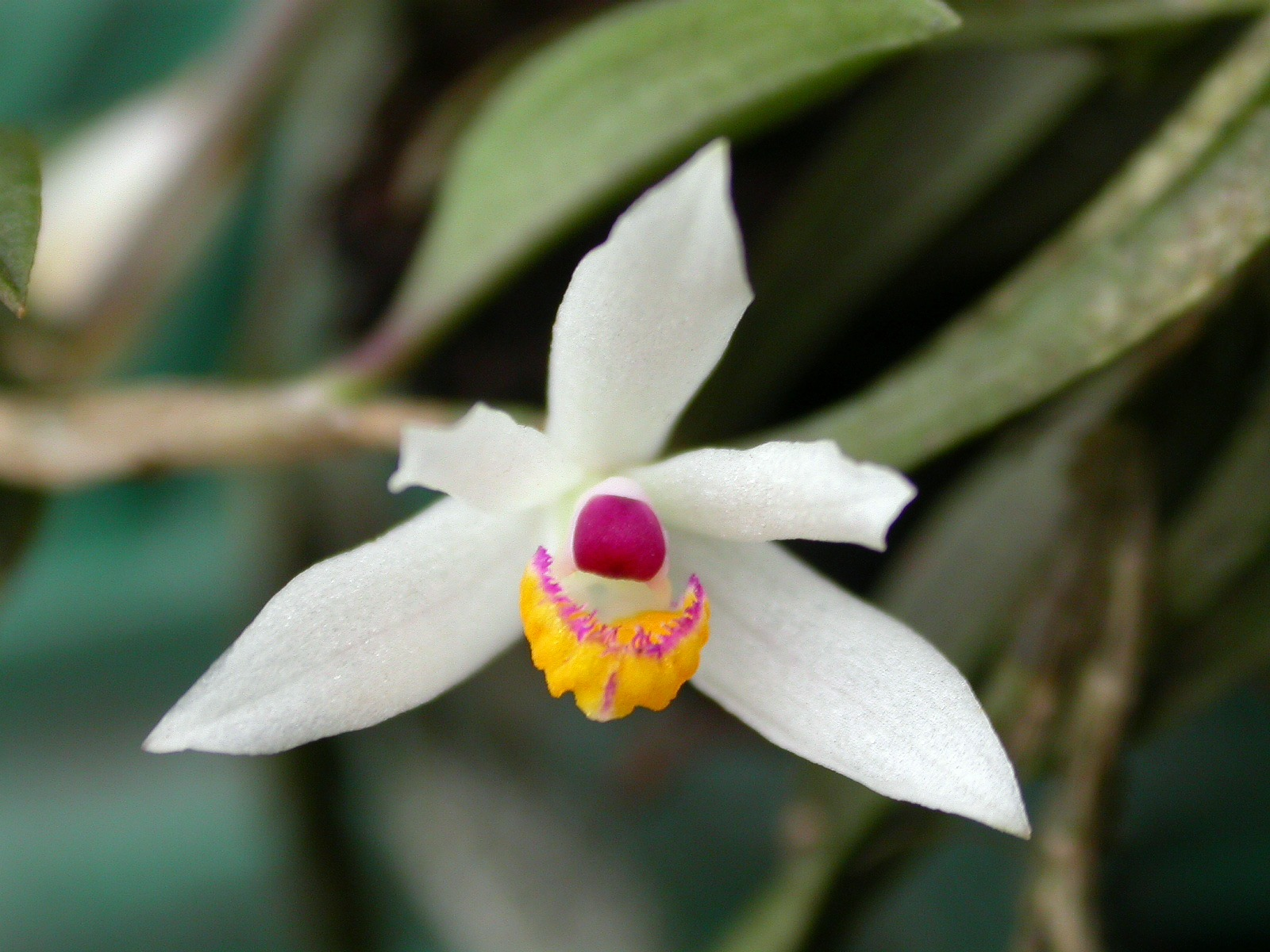

Scientific classification
- Kingdom: Plantae
- Clade: Tracheophytes
- Clade: Angiosperms
- Clade: Monocots
- Order: Asparagales
- Family: Orchidaceae
- Subfamily: Epidendroideae
- Tribe: Epidendreae
- Subtribe: Laeliinae
- Genus: Loefgrenianthus; Hoehne
- Species: L. blanche-amesiae

Binomial name
- Loefgrenianthus blanche-amesiae (Loefgr.) Hoehne

= Loefgrenianthus =

Genus of orchids

Loefgrenianthus blanche-amesiae is a showy orchid species, inhabitant of Serra do Mar mountains in Brazilian southeast. It is the only species of the monotypic genus Loefgrenianthus. It can be differentiated from its closest genus, Leptotes, both because of its pending vegetation with flat leaves and the flowers which have a saccate labellum. Loefgrenianthus blanche-amesiae is highly appreciated by orchid collectors.

== Distribution and habit ==
Loefgrenianthus blanche-amesiae is a small epiphytic species which inhabits the highest areas of Atlantic Forest of Rio de Janeiro, São Paulo and Paraná States of Brazil, particularly in Serra da Mantiqueira and Serra do Mar chains of mountains, where it is very rare. It grows under the shadow of trees in shady, humid and well ventilated woods, between 1,000 and 2,200 meters of altitude on mountains slopes. It ordinarily grows at middle height, pending from thick stems, mostly of Podocarpus and Araucaria species, despite there are records of plants occasionally growing in thin branches too.

The culture of Loefgrenianthus blanche-amesiae is reportedly hard. Because of its pending habit it should be mounted on a vegetable fiber plaque or on a piece of bark and kept sheltered form straight sunlight in a cool, humid and well ventilated place.

== Description ==
Measures (mm)
Structure	Length	Width
Rhizome	10	1
Leaf	30	5
Pseudobulb	2	1
Inflorescence	10	1
Flower	20	
Sepal	8	3
Petal	7	3
Labellum	7	3

Loefgrenianthus blanche-amesiae usually are attached to their hosts' stems by a knot of thin pinkish few branched elongated strong roots that grow mostly at the base of their stems. Adventitious roots are uncommon and possibly grow just occasionally when the stems become very long. The stems are thin, flexible and pending, formed by a simple but occasionally bifurcating elongated rhizome, and tiny pseudobulbs. The rhizome is completely covered by thin dried imbricating steaths and, after three internodes, usually gives birth to a pseudobulb always hidden by a dried narrow steath. The pseudobulbs are spaced at one-centimeter intervals and have only one apical flat, but folded at the base, elliptical lanceolated and comparatively large leaf. The leaves last for some years, and normally there are about seven pseudobulbs with leaves at the end of the stem. The older leaves at the base of the stem fall so the older segments of the plant usually are formed just by a number of bare stems and the important roots to attach the plant to the stem, occasionally showing a new growth. The inflorescences shoot from the apexes of the last one or two pseudobulbs and are apical, short and pending, bearing just one flower which faces the ground.

The flowers are comparatively large in relation to the plant size, with segments that do not completely open. The petals and sepals are white and oblong, the sepals slightly larger than the petals, sometimes with the apexes reflected. The petals are similar to the sepals but slightly narrower at the base. The labellum is strong yellow margined of bright purple; at the base it is fused to the column base forming a narrow spur shaped nectary; it is internally slightly pubescent and has a thick callus that splits in five digitate keels on the disk; the central lobe is partially saccate and has two longer fringes at the apex. The column is white almost cylindrical without any appendages. The anther, contrasting to the flower, is very bright purple, apical, bearing six pollinia, four small and two large, hold by a caudicle similar to the ones of Leptotes.

Loefgrenianthus blanche-amesiae blooms between the middle of the spring and early summer and the flowers last for about a week. Its pollinators are unknown, however, because of its color, they may be night moths, or bees due to the flowers structure.

== Taxonomic notes ==
The Swedish-Brazilian botanist Johan Albert Constantin Löfgren lived many years in Brazil where he was studying the flora of Minas Gerais State, painting watercolors of plants and was a director of Rio de Janeiro Botanical Garden. In 1896 while looking for new specimens on Serra da Mantiqueira, in Rio de Janeiro, he came across a small plant he did not recognize. At the time the Belgian Botanist Célestin Alfred Cogniaux was working on the noted Flora Brasiliensis of Carl Friedrich Philipp von Martius, an encyclopedia that described all plant species of Brazil known at the time. Therefore, trying to establish its identity, Loefgren sent the plant he found to Cogniaux, however, the specimen was lost and never recovered.

In 1915 the professor Oakes Ames, botanist responsible for the herbarium of Harvard University, and his wife Blanche were traveling in Brazil and met Loefgren. Together they accidentally found, on the slopes of Itatiaia mountain, another specimen of the plant which had been lost almost ten years before. This time Loefgren decided to describe the species himself and, considering it close to Leptotes, placed it under this genus with the name Leptotes blanche-amesiae, honoring Professor Ames's wife. In 1927, a later work on the genus Leptotes by Frederico Carlos Hoehne led him to conclude that this species, despite being closely related to it, would be better placed in another genus, therefore he proposed the genus Loefgrenianthus, in reference to Loefgren who, besides discovering the species twice, had described it.

According to Cássio van den Berg, who studied their phylogeny, Loefgrenianthus is closely related to Leptotes and both form a sister clade to another small clade that includes Pseudolaelia, Constantia and Isabellia. The two clades constitute Isabellia alliance, which is one of the eight clades of subtribus Laeliinae.
