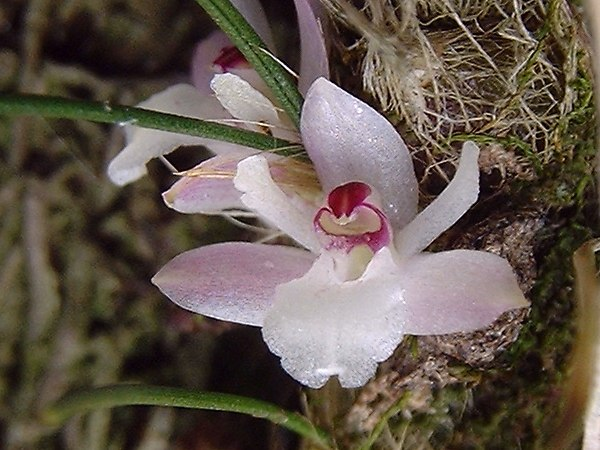
- Isabelia virginalis

Scientific classification
- Kingdom: Plantae
- Clade: Tracheophytes
- Clade: Angiosperms
- Clade: Monocots
- Order: Asparagales
- Family: Orchidaceae
- Subfamily: Epidendroideae
- Tribe: Epidendreae
- Subtribe: Laeliinae
- Genus: Isabelia; Barb.Rodr.

Type species
- Isabelia virginalis Barb.Rodr.

Species
- I. pulchella (Kraenzl.) Van den Berg & M.W.Chase; I. violacea (Lindl.) Van den Berg & M.W.Chase; I. virginalis Barb.Rodr.; I. × pabstii (Leinig) Van den Berg & M.W.Chase

Synonyms
- Neolauchea Kraenzl. 1897; Sophronitella Schltr. 1925; ×Isanitella Leinig 1971

= Isabelia =

Genus of orchids

Isabelia is an orchid genus formed by three tiny species and one natural hybrid, spread from the Northeast of Brazil to Argentina, which are closely related to the genus Constantia. During more than a century Isabelia was a genus formed by just one species, however, around 1968, it was merged with genus Neolauchea, also unispecific. In 2001, a third genus was added to it, Sophronitella. The genus name is abbreviated Isa. in cultivation.

== Distribution ==
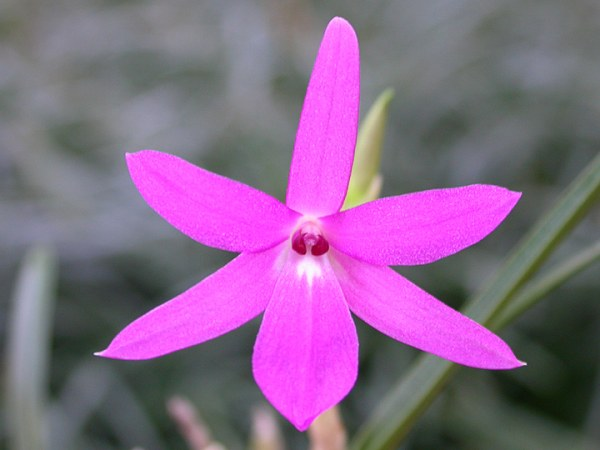
Isabelia violacea is the largest Isabelia species and also the most showy.

Isabelia are epiphytic or rarely rupicolous species that are just occasionally found but usually grow into large colonies, spread in the Atlantic Forest of Brazil from north Bahia to Rio Grande do Sul, both in the humid slopes of Serra do Mar and in the drier forests of the Brazilian Plateau, from sea level to fifteen hundred meters of altitude. I. virginalis is also found in Paraguay and north of Argentina.

Isabelia pulchella exists from Rio de Janeiro to Rio Grande do Sul, where it is more common growing epiphytically along the coastal montane areas. Isabelia is the species exposed to the higher amount of constant humidity.

Isabelia violacea is the species that can be found farther north, from Bahia State to Rio Grande do Sul, where grows epiphytically and is also common inhabiting the streams, banks, and open jungles of campos rupestres of Minas Gerais and Bahia States at around eleven hundred meters of altitude occasionally as a rupicolous under full sunlight.

Isabelia virginalis is often found epiphytically in semi-deciduous forest in São Paulo and Paraná from two to five hundred meters of altitude but can reach fifteen hundred in Minas Gerais mountains, not rarely living as a lithophyte at these elevations. It grows both on main stems and mid-height and high branches of trees, where it is exposed to plenty of luminosity, humidity and ventilation.

Isabelia × pabstii, a natural hybrid of Isabelia pulchella and I. violacea, previously known as Isanitella × pabstii, is known from a collection only, in Paraná State, South of Brazil, growing in the crevices and debris pockets of eroded sandstone outcroppings in Vila Velha, near Ponta Grossa. It has lavender pink flowers with a whiter labellum.

== Description ==
Isabelia have unifoliated ovoid to fusiform pseudobulbs, linear or acicular leaves, and erect apical inflorescence bearing one of few flowers. The flowers have petals, sepals and labellum of the same color, which can be white, pale pink or magenta. Their sepals are widely elliptical to ovate; the petals can be narrower and oblong or wider elliptic. The labellum is entire and oblong. The labellum may be entirely free or partially fused to the column forming a nectary. The column is stout and darker than the rest of the flower and may have four or eight pollinia.

All Isabelia species bloom from early autumn to early winter and their flowers last for about a week. Nothing is known about their pollinators. They have no known uses other than horticultural. Isabelia species are not very easy to cultivate. All species can be grown mounted on vegetable plaques and need plenty of humidity and ventilation and moderate to high luminosity. As these species suffer from frequent repotting it is good to leave room enough for five years of development. Their roots should not be kept humid during the night so morning waterings are preferred.

== Taxonomic notes ==
The first species of Isabelia to be discovered was I. virginalis. It was collected in Serra dos Órgãos, Rio de Janeiro and sent to Europe by George Gardner, in 1837. At that time it was regarded as possibly a Maxillaria species. Despite having been known for long time, for some unknown reason, Isabelia virginalis remained without a formal description and scientific name until 1877, when João Barbosa Rodrigues found several specimens of it in Caldas, Minas Gerais on the trees around jungle clearances. The name of this genus is an homage to Isabel, the Princess of Brazil, the daughter of D. Pedro II, Emperor at the time Barbosa Rodrigues published his book.

The first Isabelia species to be formally described was Sophronitis violacea, by John Lindley in 1840. It is a very short description where he mentions it does not have red flowers like the other Sophronitis species. In 1891, the botanist Carl Kuntze proposed it should be better identified as Sophronia violacea. In 1925, Rudolf Schlechter suggested the new genus Sophronitella to classify this species. The names was a reference to the tiny size of the plant and flowers that resembled a smaller Sophronitis.

The last Isabelia species to be described was originally published by Friedrich Kraenzlin, in 1897, as Neolauchea pulchella in homage to Director Lauche of Liechtenstein Botanic Gardens. In 1905 Andre Porsch, probably not aware of the previous description by Kraenzlin, described this species again as Meiracyllium wettsteinii. In 1968, Karheinz Senghas and H. Teuscher suggested the combination of Neulauchea with Isabelia, however, because they did not mention the publication information of the basionym, as required by the International Code of Botanical Nomenclature, their combination is considered invalid.

According to Cássio van den Berg, who studied their phylogeny, Isabelia is closely related to Pseudolaelia and Constantia and all three form a sister clade to another small clade that includes Leptotes and Loefgrenianthus. The two clades constitute the Isabelia alliance, formed by plants that share stout columns, sometimes partially adnate to the labellum forming round nectaries, and is one of the eight clades of subtribus Laeliinae. Therefore, in 2001, Cássio van den Berg and Mark W. Chase suggested the combination of Neolauchea and Sopronitella within Isabelia.

== Species ==
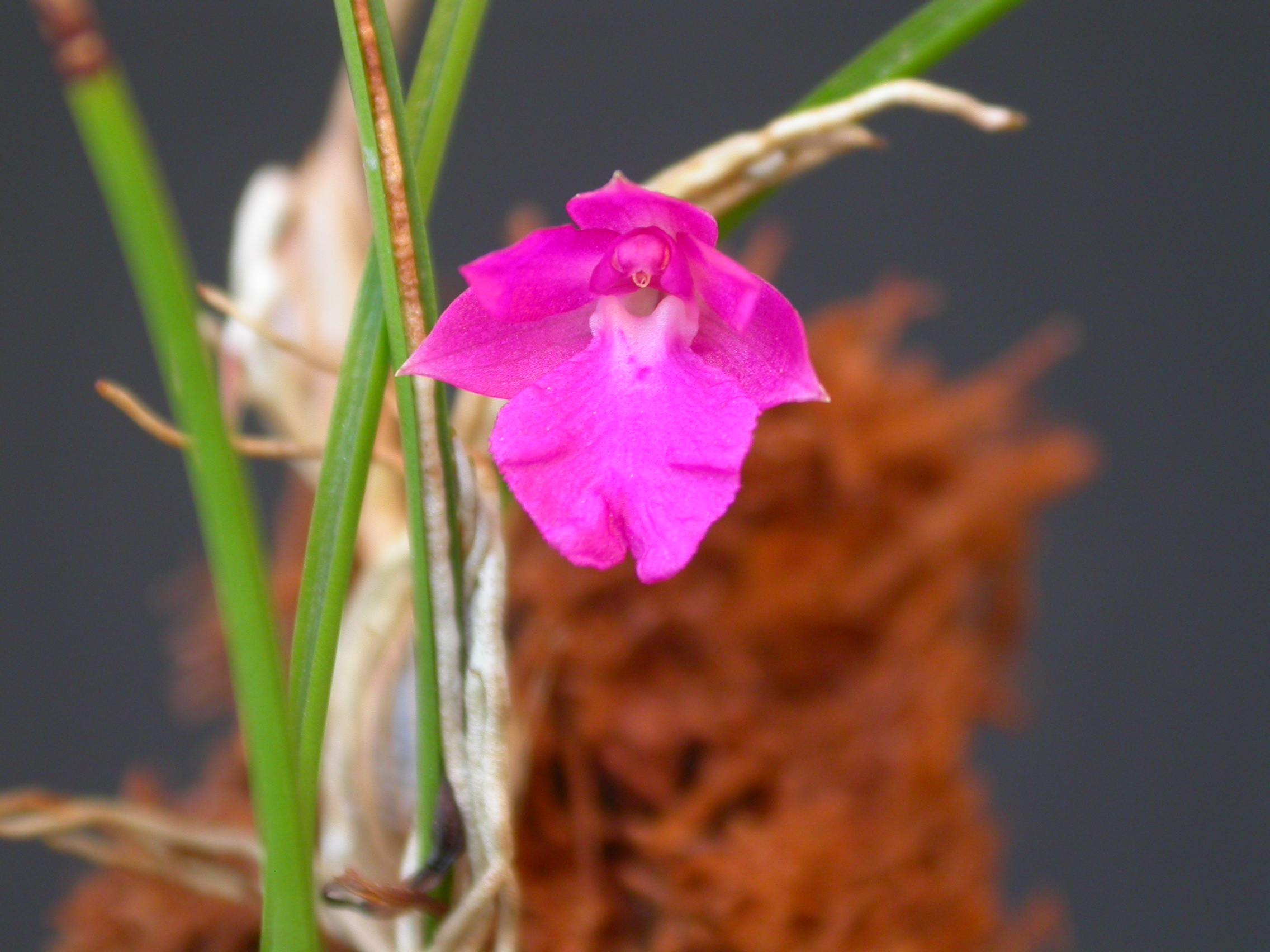
Isabelia pulchella is the only Isabelia species with an elongated rhizome.

Although the three species of Isabelia share several morphological characteristics, they are highly different from each other and very easy to identify, both through vegetative qualities and from particularities on their flowers. Although all species today are subordinated to the same genus, many orchid collectors and some taxonomists prefer the former names. The reason to unify the genera was to make clear their close relationship and to reduce the number of accepted genera, however, the use of former genera names does not imply any inconvenience of phylogenetic classification and does not create polyphyletic genera.

The former genus Neolauchea, whose only species is now Isabelia pulchella, is the only one with an elongated rhizome, therefore, very spaced pseudobulbs, topped by a highly narrow and long concave leaf that almost seems to be terete at first sight. Their ovaries become visibly swallowed at their junction to the column foot where the base of the labellum is partially fused forming a nectary. It has four pollinia.

Former Sophronitella species, now Isabelia violacea, is the largest species of Isabelia; with a short rhizome, more robust and erect pseudobulbs, with an almost flat leathery leaf. This species is the only to show more than one flower per inflorescence, up to three. It has the most opened flowers with sepals and petals of similar shape. The flower color and shape are remarkably constant in this species and just a few alba form specimens have been collected since it was discovered. It has a free labellum and eight pollinia.

The core Isabelia species, Isabelia virginalis, presents a short reptant rhizome with pseudobulbs of terete leaves, completely covered by dried stealths formed by a loose tissue of fibers interlaced as a rustic network. Their labelli are partially fused to the column forming a nectary. Their flowers always are pale pink, almost white, and have eight pollinia.
