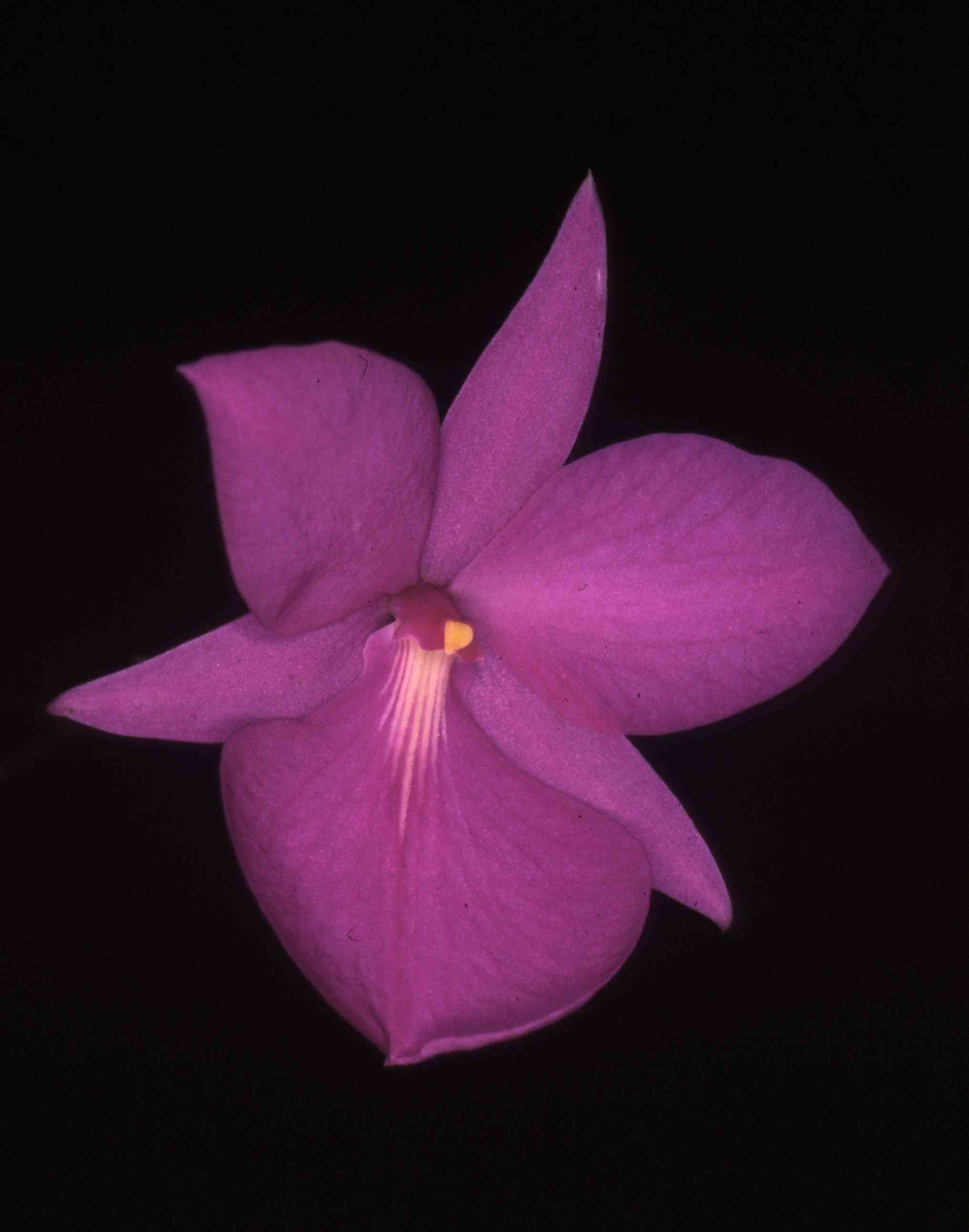

Scientific classification
- Kingdom: Plantae
- Clade: Tracheophytes
- Clade: Angiosperms
- Clade: Monocots
- Order: Asparagales
- Family: Orchidaceae
- Subfamily: Epidendroideae
- Tribe: Epidendreae
- Subtribe: Laeliinae
- Genus: Adamantinia; Van den Berg & C.N. Gonçalves (2004)
- Species: A. miltonioides

Binomial name
- Adamantinia miltonioides Van den Berg & C.N. Gonçalves

= Adamantinia =

Genus of orchids

Adamantinia is a monotypic genus of orchids (family Orchidaceae), described in 2004 by Cássio van den Berg and Cezar Neubert Gonçalves. The name is a reference to Chapada Diamantina, Brazil, where this species comes from.

The single species, Adamantinia miltonioides, is native to the Serra do Sincorá range (Brazil, Bahia, South America). It grows as an epiphyte at sunny positions, at about 900m altitude. Plants bear more or less clustered unifoliate pseudobulbs (rarely bifoliate), coriaceous dark-olive leaves, and possess long inflorescences with successive flowering. Flowers are showy, pink, with similar petals and sepals and a showy dark pink lip, with very small side lobes. Column is short, with a broad stigma. DNA data from trnL-F plastid sequences indicate relationships to Leptotes and Isabelia.
