= Leptotes =

Leptotes can refer to:

- Leptotes (butterfly), a genus of butterflies
- Leptotes (plant), a genus of orchids
