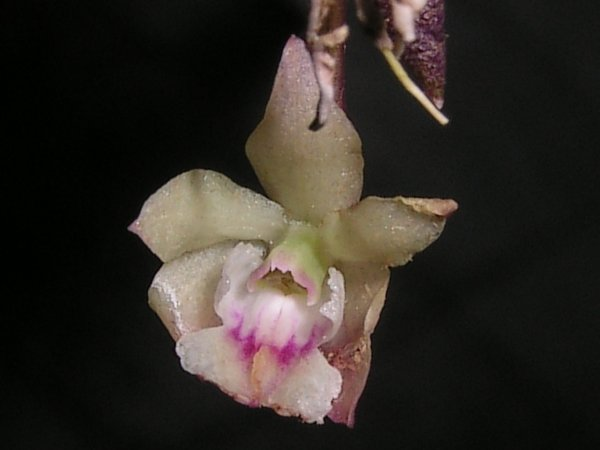

Scientific classification
- Kingdom: Plantae
- Clade: Tracheophytes
- Clade: Angiosperms
- Clade: Monocots
- Order: Asparagales
- Family: Orchidaceae
- Subfamily: Epidendroideae
- Genus: Leptotes
- Species: L. vellozicola

Binomial name
- Leptotes vellozicola Van den Berg, E.C.Smidt & Marçal

= Leptotes vellozicola =

Species of orchid

Leptotes vellozicola is a species of orchid endemic to Brazil (Bahia).
