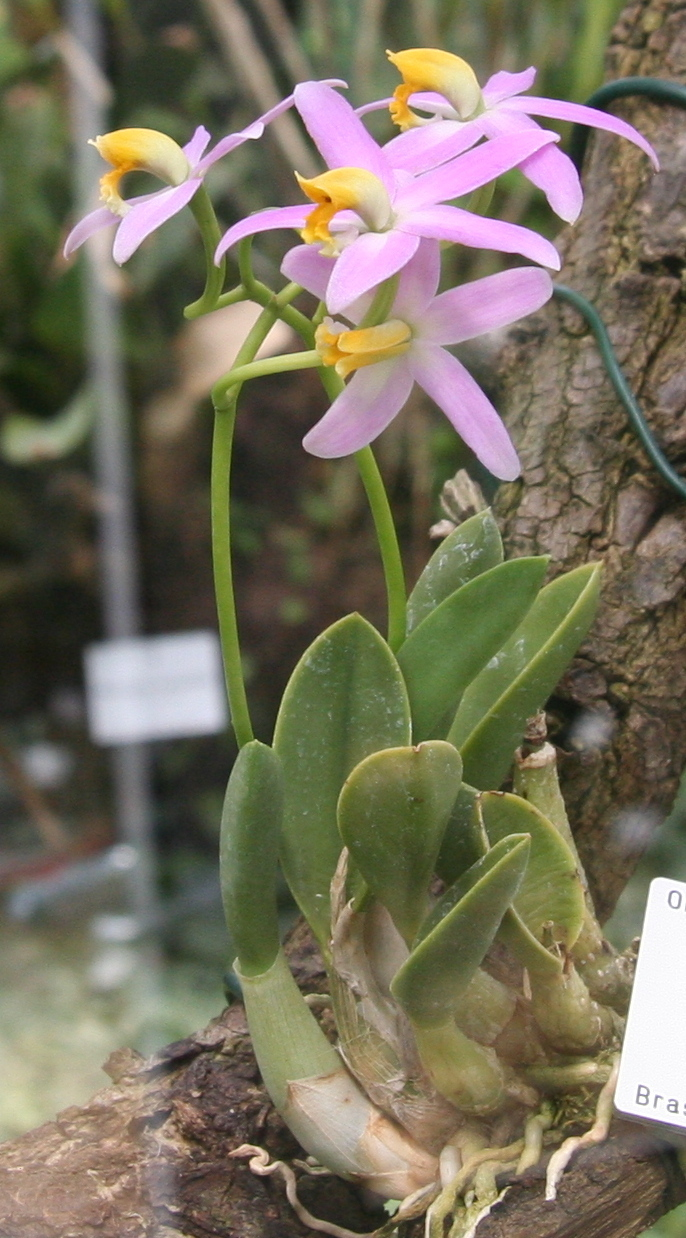
- Flowering Cattleya reginae plant

Scientific classification
- Kingdom: Plantae
- Clade: Tracheophytes
- Clade: Angiosperms
- Clade: Monocots
- Order: Asparagales
- Family: Orchidaceae
- Subfamily: Epidendroideae
- Genus: Cattleya
- Subgenus: Cattleya subg. Cattleya
- Section: Cattleya sect. Crispae
- Species: C. reginae

Binomial name
- Cattleya reginae (Rchb.f.) Van den Berg & M.W.Chase

Synonyms
- Laelia reginae Pabst (basionym); Hoffmannseggella reginae (Pabst) V.P.Castro & Chiron

= Cattleya reginae =

Species of orchid

Cattleya reginae, often known as Laelia reginae or Sophronitis reginae, is a species of orchid endemic to the Serra da Caraça mountains in the state of Minas Gerais of Brazil.
