= B. crassifolia =

B. crassifolia may refer to:

- Barbosella crassifolia, an orchid species
- Beauprea crassifolia, a plant species endemic to New Caledonia
- Bergenia crassifolia, a plant species
- Byrsonima crassifolia, a flowering plant species native to tropical America
