= B. australis =

B. australis may refer to:

- Baptisia australis, the blue wild indigo or blue false indigo, a herbaceous perennial plant species native to North America
- Barbosella australis, an orchid species
- Brunonia australis, the blue pincushion or cornflower, a perennial herbaceous plant species found in Australia
- Botryosphaeria australis, a synonym for Neofusicoccum australe, a fungus species

== See also ==
- Australis (disambiguation)
