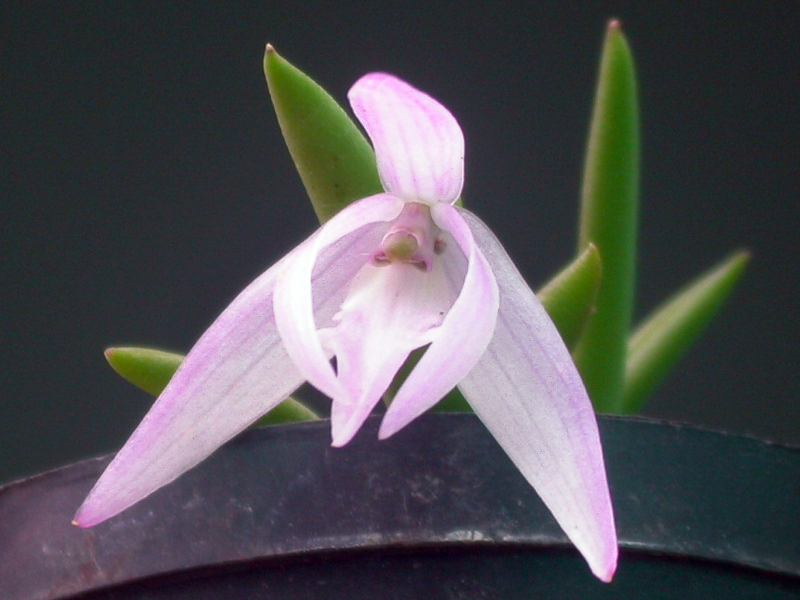

Scientific classification
- Kingdom: Plantae
- Clade: Tracheophytes
- Clade: Angiosperms
- Clade: Monocots
- Order: Asparagales
- Family: Orchidaceae
- Subfamily: Epidendroideae
- Genus: Leptotes
- Species: L. unicolor

Binomial name
- Leptotes unicolor Rchb.f.

Synonyms
- Leptotes paranaensis Barb.Rodr.

= Leptotes unicolor =

Species of orchid

Leptotes unicolor is a species of orchid native to Brazil, Argentina and Paraguay.
