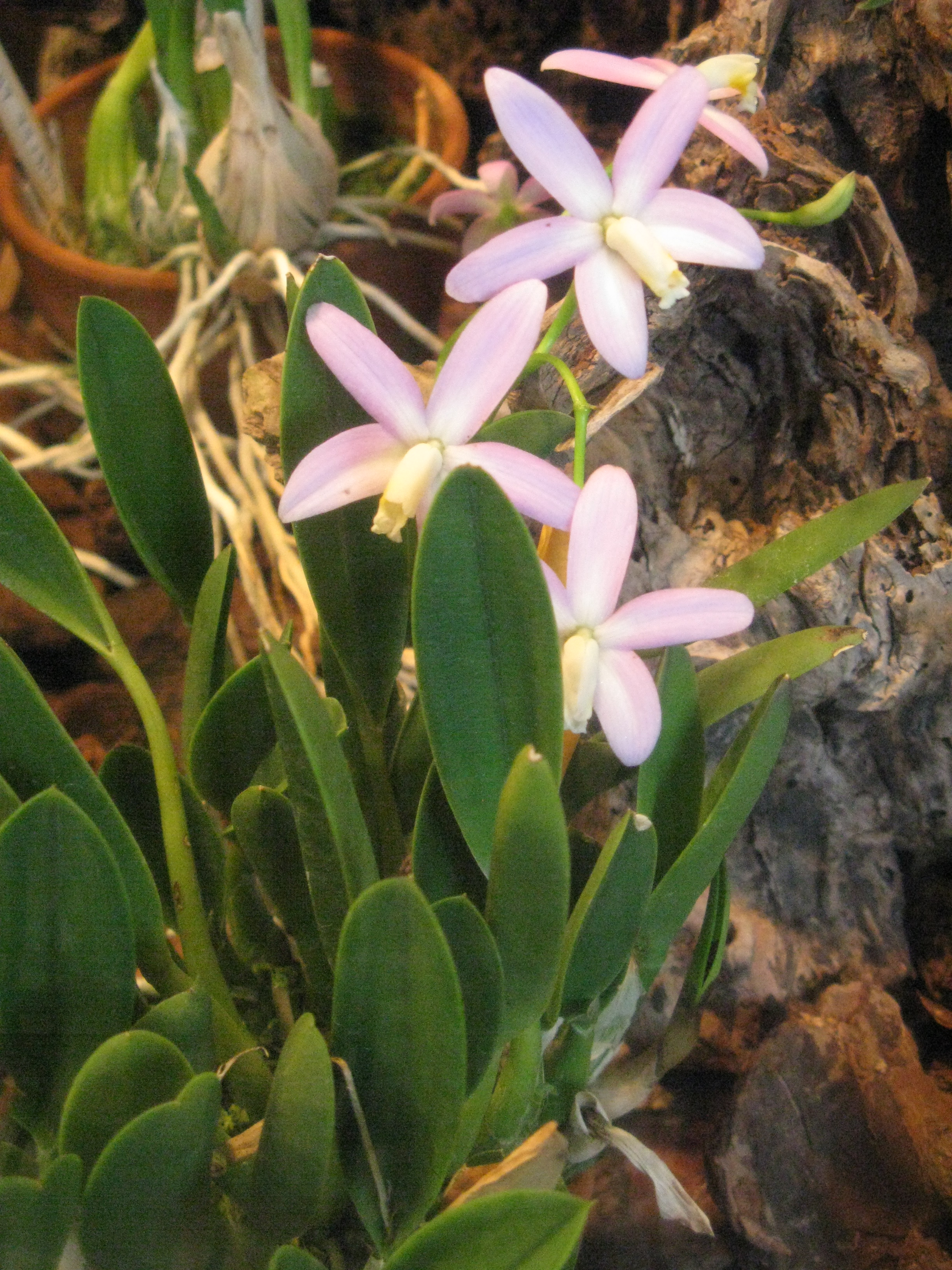
- Sophronitis longipes plant

Scientific classification
- Kingdom: Plantae
- Clade: Tracheophytes
- Clade: Angiosperms
- Clade: Monocots
- Order: Asparagales
- Family: Orchidaceae
- Subfamily: Epidendroideae
- Genus: Cattleya
- Subgenus: Cattleya subg. Cattleya
- Section: Cattleya sect. Crispae
- Species: C. longipes

Binomial name
- Cattleya longipes (Rchb.f.) Van den Berg & M.W.Chase

Synonyms
- Laelia longipes Rchb.f.; Bletia longipes (Rchb.f.) Rchb.f.; Laelia lucasiana Rolfe; Laelia longipes var. lucasiana (Rolfe) Schltr.; Hoffmannseggella longipes (Rchb.f.) V.P.Castro & Chiron

= Cattleya longipes =

Long-column sophronitis

Species of orchid

Cattleya longipes, commonly known as the long-column sophronitis, is a species of orchid endemic to southeastern Brazil (Serra do Cipó).
