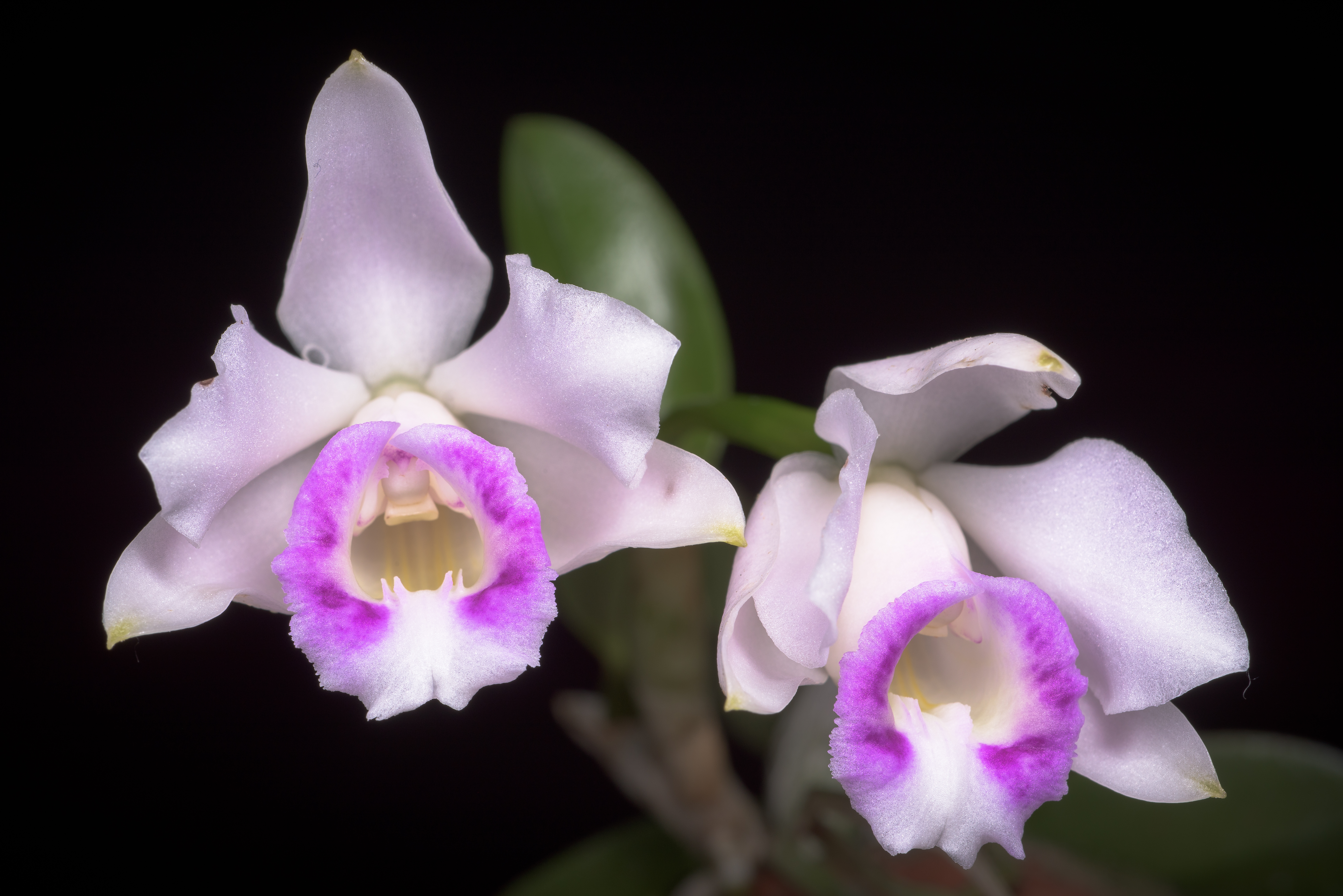
- Flowers of Cattleya alaorii

Scientific classification
- Kingdom: Plantae
- Clade: Tracheophytes
- Clade: Angiosperms
- Clade: Monocots
- Order: Asparagales
- Family: Orchidaceae
- Subfamily: Epidendroideae
- Genus: Cattleya
- Subgenus: Cattleya subg. Cattleya
- Section: Cattleya sect. Crispae
- Species: C. alaorii

Binomial name
- Cattleya alaorii (Brieger & Bicalho) Van den Berg

Synonyms
- Laelia alaorii Brieger & Bicalho; Sophronitis alaorii Brieger & Bicalho (Van den Berg) & M.W.Chase; Hadrolaelia alaorii (Brieger & Bicalho) Chiron & V.P.Castro

= Cattleya alaorii =

Alaor's cattleya

Species of orchid

Cattleya alaorii is a species of orchid endemic to Brazil (Bahia).

The species was named after Mr. Alaor Oliveira, former employee at the University of São Paulo at Piracicaba, who first collected this species in a field excursion in the late 1960s.

== Distribution ==
It was discovered in the 1970s in an isolated mountain chain near Itabuna, Bahia state. It grows in the very wet Bahia coastal forests ecoregion of the Atlantic Forest biome (Mata Atlantica Brasileira). It is found in rainforests at about 600 metres (2,000 ft) above sea level.

The plants are epiphytes in tall trees up to 40 metres (130 ft) high, and grow in the top branches where they get a fair amount of light. Their environment is always foggy and minimum temperatures in winter are never less than 15 °C (59 °F).
