= B. gardneri =

B. gardneri may refer to:

- Banksia gardneri, the prostrate banksia, a shrub species found along the south coast of Western Australia
- Barbosella gardneri, an orchid species

== See also ==
- Gardneri
