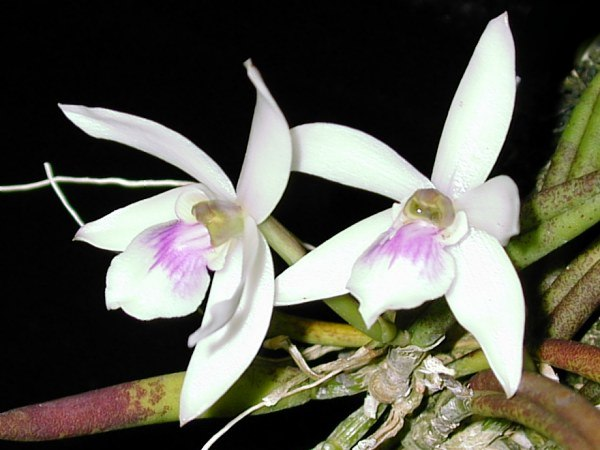

Scientific classification
- Kingdom: Plantae
- Clade: Tracheophytes
- Clade: Angiosperms
- Clade: Monocots
- Order: Asparagales
- Family: Orchidaceae
- Subfamily: Epidendroideae
- Genus: Leptotes
- Species: L. mogyensis

Binomial name
- Leptotes mogyensis Krackow. ex Christenson

= Leptotes mogyensis =

Species of orchid

Leptotes mogyensis is a species of orchid endemic to southeastern Brazil.
