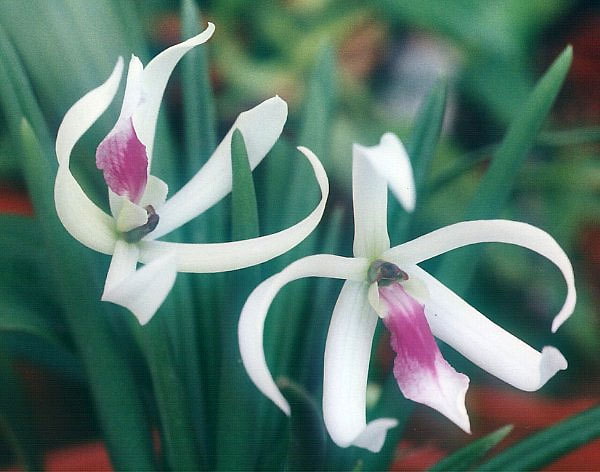

Scientific classification
- Kingdom: Plantae
- Clade: Embryophytes
- Clade: Tracheophytes
- Clade: Angiosperms
- Clade: Monocots
- Order: Asparagales
- Family: Orchidaceae
- Subfamily: Epidendroideae
- Genus: Leptotes
- Species: L. bicolor

Binomial name
- Leptotes bicolor Lindl.

Synonyms
- Tetramicra bicolor (Lindl.) Rolfe; Leptotes serrulata Lindl.; Leptotes glaucophylla Hoffmanns.; Tetramicra serrulata (Lindl.) G. Nicholson

= Leptotes bicolor =

Species of orchid

Leptotes bicolor is a species of orchid native to Paraguay and southern Brazil. It is the type species of the genus Leptotes. Its flowers and fruits are used as a substitute for vanilla in milk and ice cream.

It grows in cooler climates than vanilla, as its distribution occupies regions more distant from the equator. It contains vanillin, the main compound of the extract of vanilla. It is grown as an ornamental plant.

== Description ==
Leptotes bicolor is a miniature sized epiphyte. The pseudobulbs are terete and the fragrant flowers are borne in groups of 1-3 and are mostly white with a prominent purple patch on the labellum.
