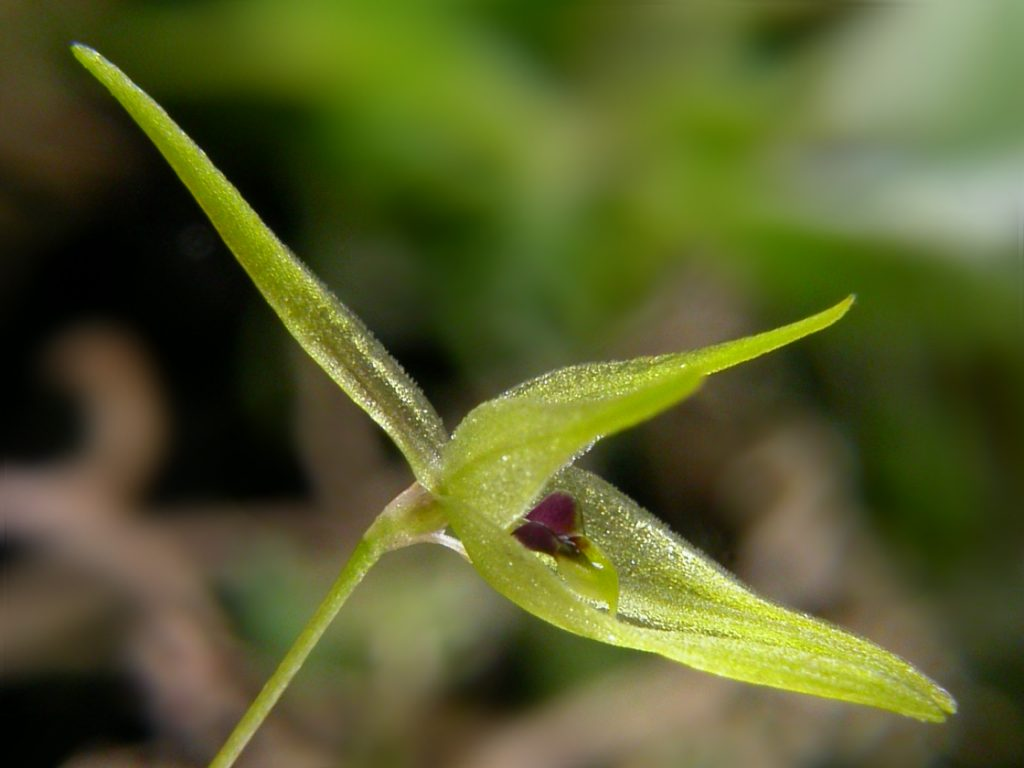
- Barbosella gardneri

Scientific classification
- Kingdom: Plantae
- Clade: Tracheophytes
- Clade: Angiosperms
- Clade: Monocots
- Order: Asparagales
- Family: Orchidaceae
- Subfamily: Epidendroideae
- Tribe: Epidendreae
- Subtribe: Pleurothallidinae
- Genus: Barbosella; Schltr. (1918)

Type species
- Pleurothallis gardneri Lindl.

Synonyms
- Barbrodria Luer

= Barbosella =

Genus of orchids

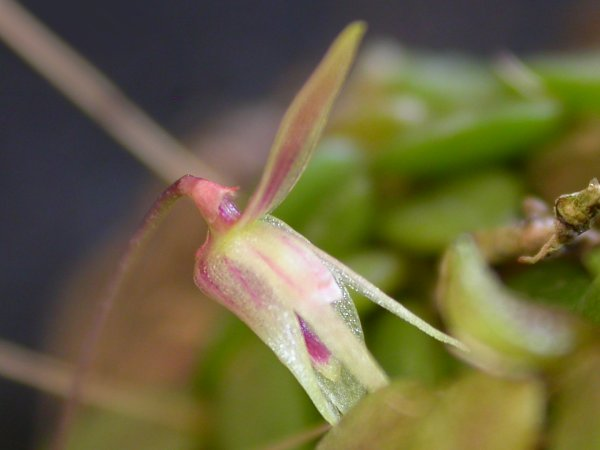
Barbosella crassifolia

Barbosella is a genus of mostly creeping orchids. The genus has about 20 species, widespread across the West Indies and Latin America from Mexico and the Lesser Antilles to Argentina. Named after João Barbosa Rodrigues, an investigator of Brazilian orchids. They have solitary flowers with a unique lip base that works like a ball and socket.

== Taxonomy ==
Barbosella miersii is thought to differ from the other species of Barbosella in terms of its lip. The monotypic genus Barbrodria was created to accommodate this species, However, it the World Checklist of Selected Plant Families (WCSP), this splinter group is currently not recognized.

== List of species ==
1. Barbosella australis (Cogn.) Schltr., Brazil.
2. Barbosella circinata Luer, Panama.
3. Barbosella cogniauxiana (Speg. & Kraenzl.) Schltr., Brazil and Argentina.
4. Barbosella crassifolia (Edwall) Schltr., Brazil.
5. Barbosella cucullata (Lindley) Schltr., Venezuela, Colombia, Bolivia, Ecuador and Peru.
6. Barbosella dolichorhiza Costa Rica, Nicaragua, Colombia, Peru and Ecuador.
7. Barbosella dusenii (Samp.) Schltr., Brazil.
8. Barbosella gardneri (Lindl.) Schltr., Brazil.
9. Barbosella geminata Luer, Costa Rica.
10. Barbosella macaheensis (Cogn.) Luer, Brazil.
11. Barbosella miersii (Lindl.) Schltr. - Brazil
12. Barbosella orbicularis Luer, Costa Rica, Panama, Brazil, Venezuela and Ecuador.
13. Barbosella portillae Luer, Ecuador.
14. Barbosella prorepens (Rchb.f.) Schltr., México (Guerrero, Oaxaca, Veracruz), Costa Rica, Guatemala, Nicaragua, Panama, Cuba, Dominican Republic, Jamaica, Lesser Antilles, Venezuela, Colombia, Bolivia, Peru and Ecuador.
15. Barbosella ricii Luer & R.Vásquez, Bolivia.
16. Barbosella schista Luer & R.Escobar, Colombia and Venezuela.
17. Barbosella spiritu-sanctensis (Pabst) F.Barros & Toscano, Brazil.
18. Barbosella trilobata Pabst, Brazil.
19. Barbosella vasquezii Luer, Bolivia.

== Synonyms ==
1. Barbosella anaristella (Kraenzl.) Garay see Barbosella dolichorhiza Schltr.
2. Barbosella australis var. genuina Hoehne see Barbosella australis (Cogn.) Schltr.
3. Barbosella australis var. latipetala Hoehne see Barbosella australis (Cogn.) Schltr.
4. Barbosella australis var. loefgrenii (Cogn.) Hoehne see Barbosella australis (Cogn.) Schltr.
5. Barbosella bradeorum Schltr. see Barbosella dolichorhiza Schltr.
6. Barbosella brenesii Schltr. see Barbosella prorepens (Rchb.f.) Schltr.
7. Barbosella caespitifica (F. Lehm. & Kraenzl.) Garay see Barbosella prorepens (Rchb.f.) Schltr.
8. Barbosella crassifolia var. aristata Hoehne see Barbosella crassifolia (Edwall) Schltr.
9. Barbosella crassifolia var. genuina Hoehne see Barbosella crassifolia (Edwall) Schltr.
10. Barbosella crassifolia var. minor Hoehne see Barbosella crassifolia (Edwall) Schltr.
11. Barbosella dussii (Cogn.) Dod see Barbosella prorepens (Rchb.f.) Schltr.
12. Barbosella fuscata Garay see Barbosella dolichorhiza Schltr.
13. Barbosella gardneri var. dusenii (A. Samp.) Hoehne see Barbosella dusenii (Samp.) Schltr.
14. Barbosella gardneri var. genuina Hoehne see Barbosella gardneri (Lindl.) Schltr.
15. Barbosella hamburgensis (Kraenzl.) Hoehne see Barbosella crassifolia (Edwall) Schltr.
16. Barbosella handroi Hoehne see Barbosella cogniauxiana (Speg. & Kraenzl.) Schltr.
17. Barbosella kegelii (Rchb.f.) Schltr. see Chamelophyton kegelii
18. Barbosella loefgrenii (Cogn.) Schltr. see Barbosella australis (Cogn.) Schltr.
19. Barbosella longiflora (Kraenzl.) Schl tr. see Barbosella cucullata (Lindley) Schltr.
20. Barbosella longipes Schltr. see Barbosella cucullata (Lindley) Schltr.
21. Barbosella microphylla (Barb.Rodr.) Schltr. see Barbosella gardneri (Lindley) Schltr.
22. Barbosella monstrabilis (Ames) Garay see Barbosella prorepens (Rchb.f.) Schltr.
23. Barbosella porschii (Kraenzl.) Schltr. see Barbosella cogniauxiana (Speg. & Kraenzl.) Schltr.
24. Barbosella reichenbachiana (Endres) Schltr. see Restrepiopsis reichenbachiana (Endres) Luer
25. Barbosella rhynchantha (Rchb.f. & Warsz.) Schltr. see Barbosella cucullata (Li ndl.) Schltr.
26. Barbosella riograndensis Dutra ex Pabst see Barbosella cogniauxiana (Speg. & Kraenzl.) Schltr.
27. Barbosella tolimensis (Kraenzl.) Garay see Barbosella prorepens (Rchb.f.)
28. Barbosella varicosa (Lindley) Schltr. see Barbosella cucullata (Lindley) Schltr.
