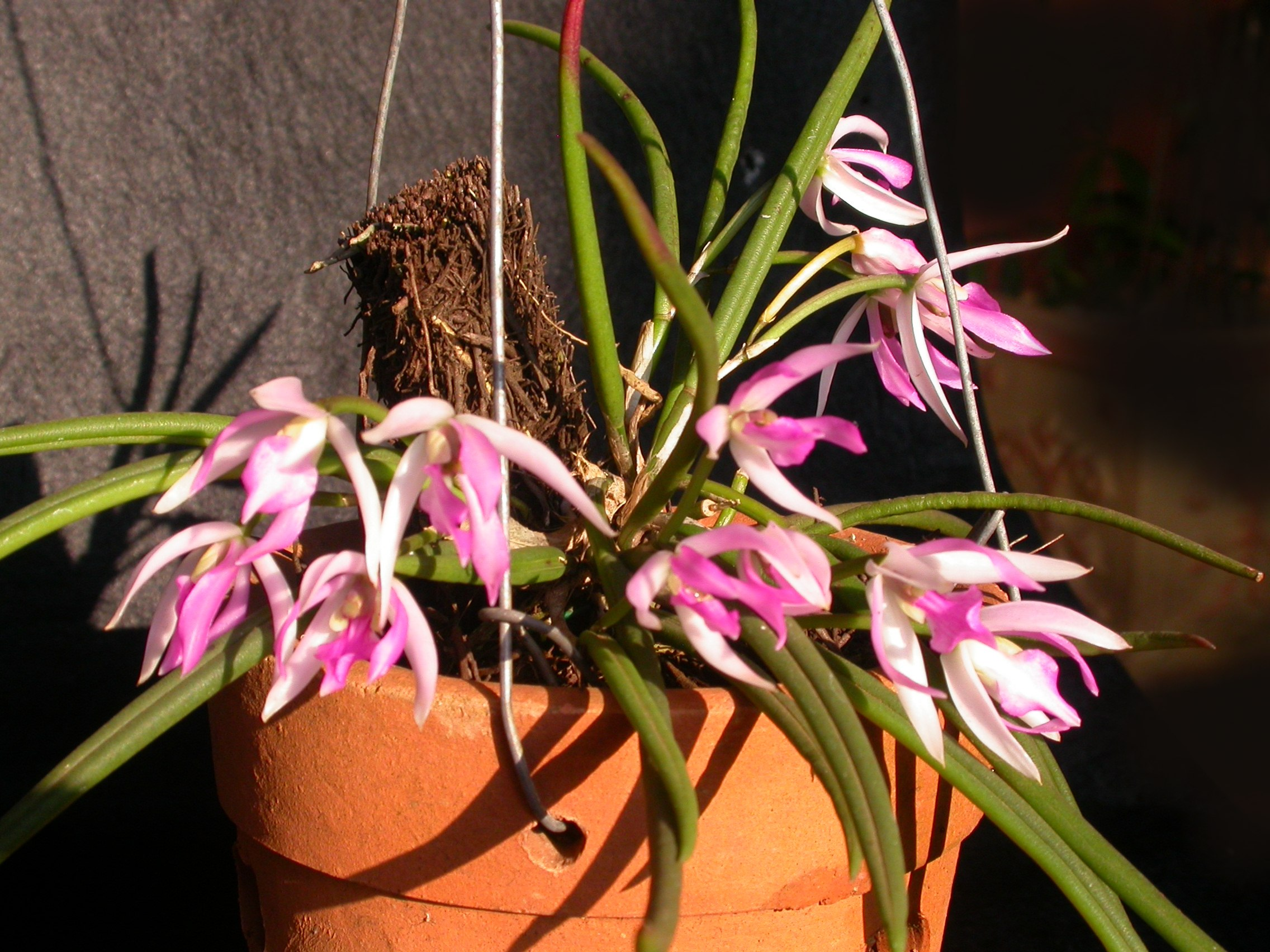

Scientific classification
- Kingdom: Plantae
- Clade: Embryophytes
- Clade: Tracheophytes
- Clade: Spermatophytes
- Clade: Angiosperms
- Clade: Monocots
- Order: Asparagales
- Family: Orchidaceae
- Subfamily: Epidendroideae
- Genus: Leptotes
- Species: L. pohlitinocoi

Binomial name
- Leptotes pohlitinocoi V.P.Castro & Chiron

= Leptotes pohlitinocoi =

Species of orchid

Leptotes pohlitinocoi is a species of orchid endemic to Brazil (Bahia).
