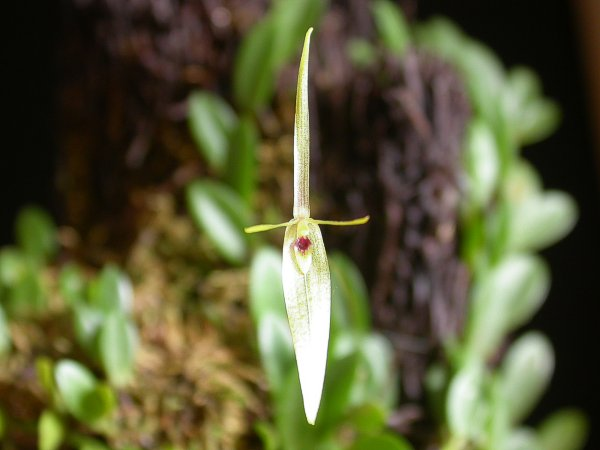

Scientific classification
- Kingdom: Plantae
- Clade: Tracheophytes
- Clade: Angiosperms
- Clade: Monocots
- Order: Asparagales
- Family: Orchidaceae
- Subfamily: Epidendroideae
- Genus: Barbosella
- Species: B. cogniauxiana

Binomial name
- Barbosella cogniauxiana (Speg. & Kraenzl.) Schltr. (1918)

Synonyms
- Restrepia cogniauxiana Speg. & Kraenzl. (1908) (Basionym); Restrepia porschii Kraenzl. (1911); Barbosella porschii (Kraenzl.) Schltr. (1918); Barbosella handroi Hoehne (1933); Pleurothallis spegazziniana L.O. Williams (1941); Barbosella riograndensis Dutra ex Pabst (1959)

= Barbosella cogniauxiana =

Species of orchid

Barbosella cogniauxiana is a species of orchid.

It is native to the Atlantic Forest in southern Brazil (States of São Paulo, Santa Catarina, Rio de Janeiro, Paraná); and in eastern Argentina in Misiones state.

== See also ==
- List of plants of Atlantic Forest vegetation of Brazil
