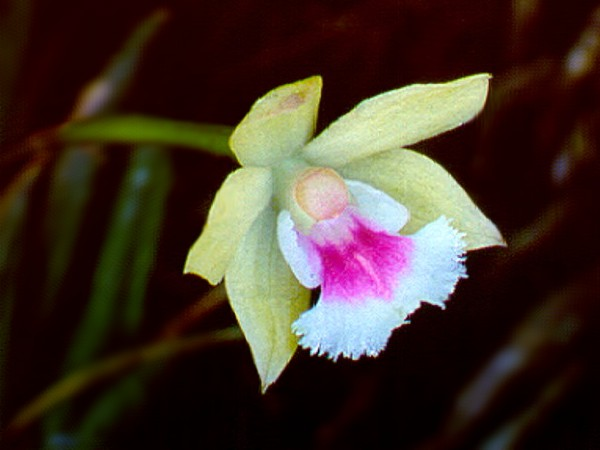

Scientific classification
- Kingdom: Plantae
- Clade: Tracheophytes
- Clade: Angiosperms
- Clade: Monocots
- Order: Asparagales
- Family: Orchidaceae
- Subfamily: Epidendroideae
- Genus: Leptotes
- Species: L. tenuis

Binomial name
- Leptotes tenuis Rchb.f.

Synonyms
- Leptotes minuta (Rolfe) Rolfe; Tetramicra minuta Rolfe

= Leptotes tenuis =

Species of orchid

Leptotes tenuis is a species of orchid endemic to Brazil.
