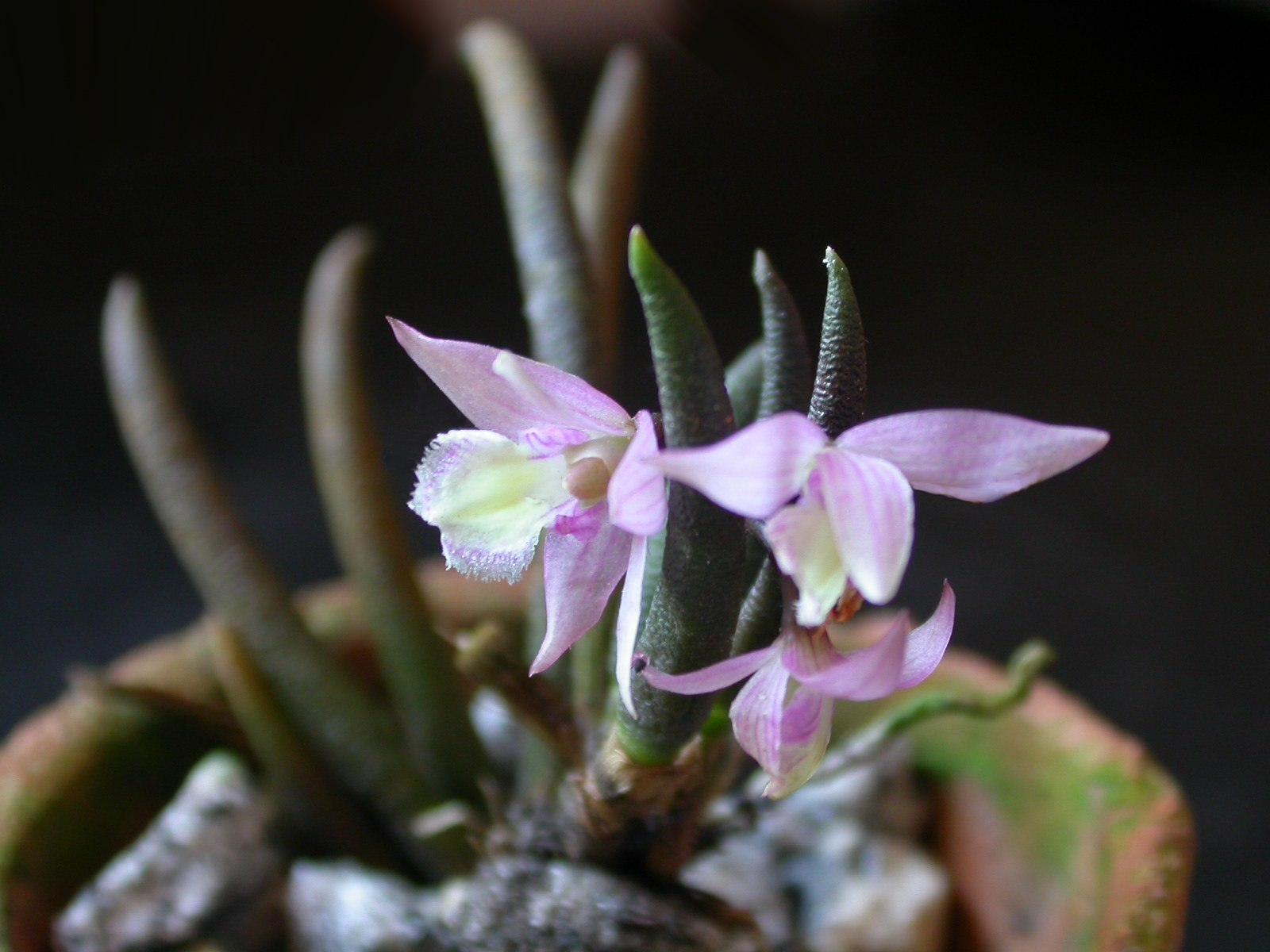

Scientific classification
- Kingdom: Plantae
- Clade: Tracheophytes
- Clade: Angiosperms
- Clade: Monocots
- Order: Asparagales
- Family: Orchidaceae
- Subfamily: Epidendroideae
- Genus: Leptotes
- Species: L. harryphillipsii

Binomial name
- Leptotes harryphillipsii Christenson

= Leptotes harryphillipsii =

Species of orchid

Leptotes harryphillipsii is a species of orchid endemic to southeastern Brazil.
