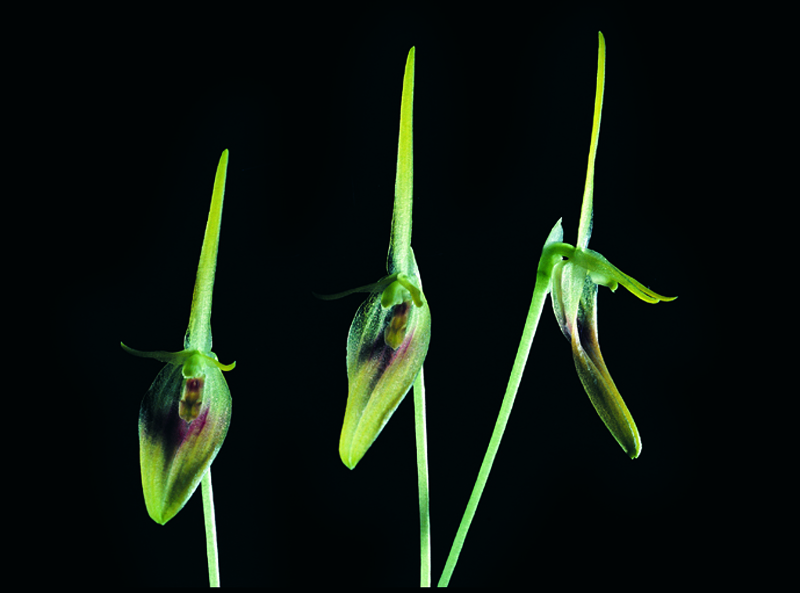

Scientific classification
- Kingdom: Plantae
- Clade: Tracheophytes
- Clade: Angiosperms
- Clade: Monocots
- Order: Asparagales
- Family: Orchidaceae
- Subfamily: Epidendroideae
- Genus: Barbosella
- Species: B. dolichorhiza

Binomial name
- Barbosella dolichorhiza Schltr. (1920)

Synonyms
- include: Masdevallia anaristella Kraenzl. (1921); Barbosella bradeorum Schltr. (1923); Pleurothallis bradeorum (Schltr.) Ames (1934); Pleurothallis anaristella (Kraenzl.) L.O. Williams (1950); Barbosella fuscata Garay (1969); Barbosella anaristella (Kraenzl.) Garay (1974); Triaristellina anaristella (Kraenzl.) Rauschert (1983)

= Barbosella dolichorhiza =

Species of plant

Barbosella dolichorhiza is a species of orchid. It is native to Costa Rica, Nicaragua, Colombia, Peru and Ecuador.
