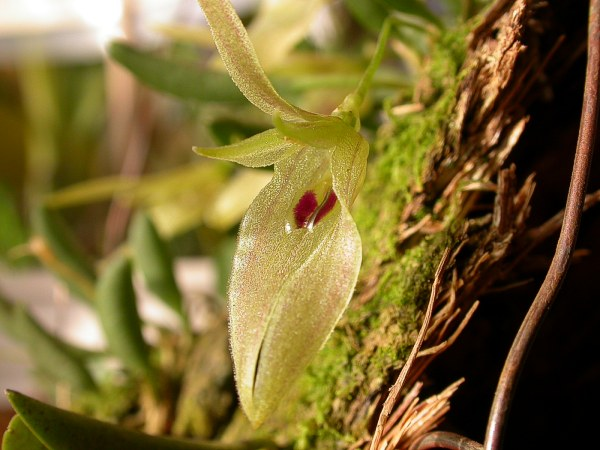

Scientific classification
- Kingdom: Plantae
- Clade: Tracheophytes
- Clade: Angiosperms
- Clade: Monocots
- Order: Asparagales
- Family: Orchidaceae
- Subfamily: Epidendroideae
- Genus: Barbosella
- Species: B. australis

Binomial name
- Barbosella australis (Cogn.) Schltr. (1918)

Synonyms
- Restrepia australis Cogn. (1906) (Basionym); Restrepia loefgrenii Cogn. (1906); Barbosella loefgrenii (Cogn.) Schltr. (1918); Barbosella australis var. genuina Hoehne (1947); Barbosella australis var. latipetala Hoehne (1947); Barbosella australis var. loefgrenii (Cogn.) Hoehne (1947)

= Barbosella australis =

Species of orchid

Barbosella australis is a species of orchid endemic to Brazil. It is known from the States of São Paulo and Rio Grande do Sul.
