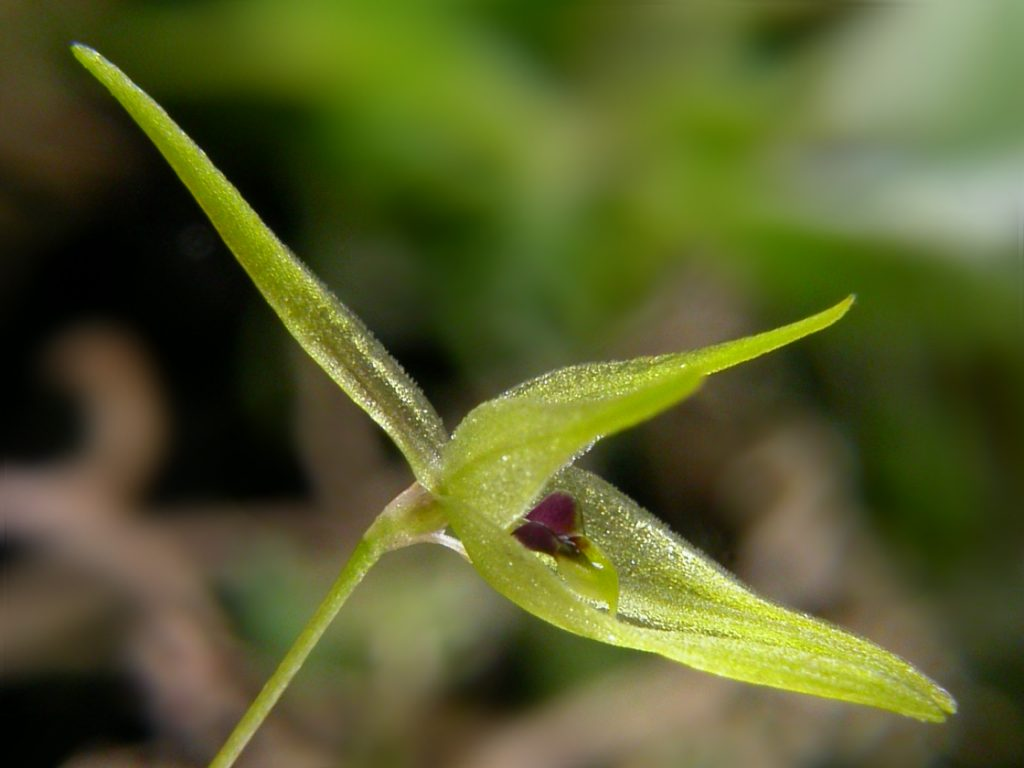

Scientific classification
- Kingdom: Plantae
- Clade: Tracheophytes
- Clade: Angiosperms
- Clade: Monocots
- Order: Asparagales
- Family: Orchidaceae
- Subfamily: Epidendroideae
- Genus: Barbosella
- Species: B. gardneri

Binomial name
- Barbosella gardneri (Lindl.) Schltr.(1918)

Synonyms
- Pleurothallis gardneri Lindl. (1842) (Basionym); Restrepia microphylla Barb.Rodr. (1881); Restrepia gardneri (Lindl.) Benth. (1883); Humboldtia gardneri (Lindl.) Kuntze (1891); Barbosella microphylla (Barb.Rodr.) Schltr. (1918); Barbosella gardneri var. genuina Hoehne (1947)

= Barbosella gardneri =

Species of orchid

Barbosella gardneri is a species of orchid endemic to Brazil. It is the type species of its genus and was named for Brazilian botanist and director of the Botanic Gardens in Manaus and Rio de Janeiro, Joao Barbosa Rodrigues (1842-1909).
