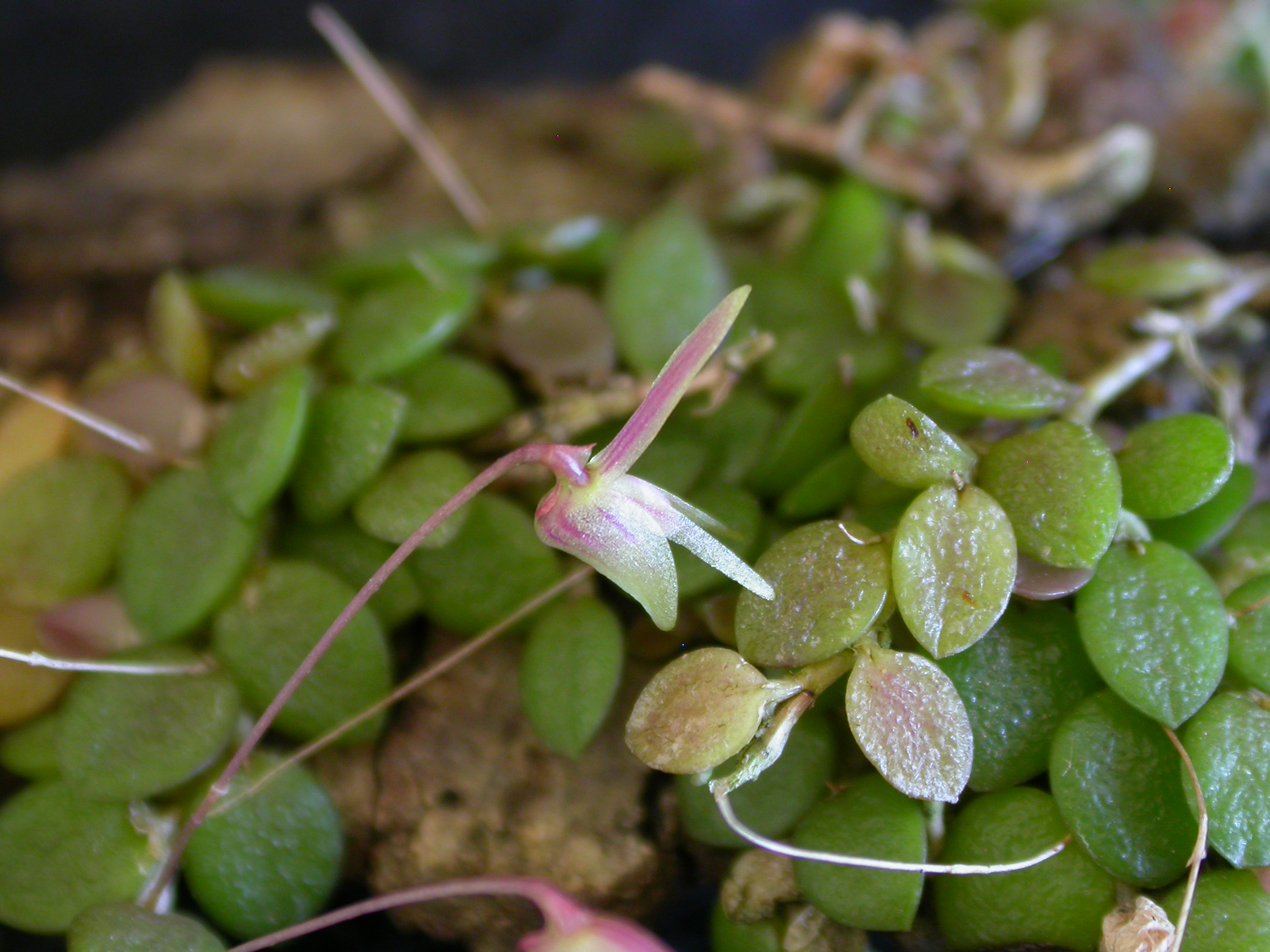

Scientific classification
- Kingdom: Plantae
- Clade: Tracheophytes
- Clade: Angiosperms
- Clade: Monocots
- Order: Asparagales
- Family: Orchidaceae
- Subfamily: Epidendroideae
- Genus: Barbosella
- Species: B. crassifolia

Binomial name
- Barbosella crassifolia (Edwall) Schltr. (1918)

Synonyms
- Restrepia crassifolia Edwall (1903) (Basionym); Pleurothallis hamburgensis Kraenzl. (1911); Barbosella crassifolia var. aristata Hoehne (1947); Barbosella crassifolia var. genuina Hoehne (1947); Barbosella crassifolia var. minor Hoehne (1947); Barbosella hamburgensis (Kraenzl.) Hoehne (1947); Barbosella crassifolia var. hamburgensis (Kraenzl.) Garay (1953)

= Barbosella crassifolia =

Species of orchid

Barbosella crassifolia is a species of orchid endemic to Brazil.

== Distribution ==
Found in southern and eastern Brazil in dense primary forests at an elevation of 950 to 1500 meters. It is known from the states of Bahia, Minas Gerais, Rio Grande do Sul and São Paulo.

== Description ==
Barbosella crassifolia is a miniature sized, warm to cool growing, mat forming epiphyte with ascending ramicauls enveloped by a thin, tubular sheath and carrying a single, apical, prostrate, thickly coriaceous, suborbicular to elliptical, entire apically, obtuse rounded, rounded and contracted below into the nearly absent petiolate base leaf that blooms in the late winter and early spring on a slender, erect, 0.6 to 1.12" [1.5 to .8 cm] long, solitary flowered inflorescence with a minute bract below the middle and an oblique floral bract.
