= João Barbosa Rodrigues =

Brazilian botanist

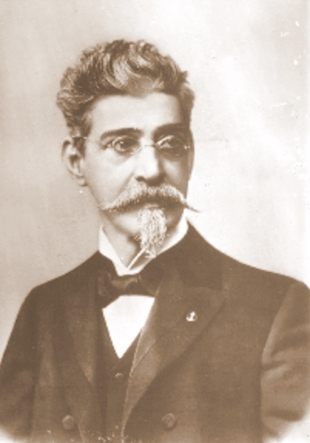
- Born: June 22, 1842; São Gonçalo do Sapucaí, Empire of Brazil
- Died: March 6, 1909 (aged 66); Rio de Janeiro, Brazil
- Scientific career
- Fields: Botany
- Workplaces: Rio de Janeiro Botanical Garden
- Author abbrev. (botany): Barb.Rodr.

João Barbosa Rodrigues (June 22, 1842 – March 6, 1909) was considered one of Brazil's greatest botanists, known especially for his work on orchids and palms. For nearly two decades he was director of the Botanic Garden of Rio de Janeiro. Something of a polymath, he was a prolific botanical artist who also made contributions to his country's ethnography, geography, linguistics, zoology, and literature. The standard author abbreviation Barb.Rodr. is used to indicate this person as the author when citing a botanical name.

== Early life and education ==
Rodrigues was born on June 22, 1842, in São Gonçalo do Sapucaí, Brazil, and was initially raised in Campanha, in the state of Minas Gerais, before the family returned to Rio de Janeiro in 1858. His father was a Portuguese merchant, and his mother was a Brazilian of Indian descent. He had several siblings: brothers João Baptista and Arthur and sisters Maria and Olympia. He showed early ability as a writer and he was always interested in natural science, particularly in collecting insects and plants. However, he went to the Central School of Engineering in Rio de Janeiro, where he got a classical education. Only after graduating in 1869 did he really begin to pursue his scientific interests.

== Career ==
Rodrigues initially became a teacher of drawing at the Colégio Pedro II who specialized in botany, under the supervision of Francisco Freire Allemão e Cysneiro. He began his botanical expeditions in 1868 and was commissioned by the Brazilian government in 1871 to explore the Amazon basin and study palms, in part due to sponsorship by Guilherme Schüch, the Baron of Capanema. This expedition lasted more than three years, during which time which he drew not only plants but also animals and Indian artefacts.

By the early 1890s, he had created nearly 900 color plates of Brazilian orchids. Because of difficulty financing a publication with illustrations, Rodrigues published descriptions of more than 540 new orchids and 28 new genera without any images in his important two-volume work Genera et species orchidearum novarum (1877/1881). He then allowed another botanist, Alfred Cogniaux, to publish black-and-white versions of some 260 of his drawings in Cogniaux's Flora Brasiliensis (1893–1906). Nearly one-third of the species included in Flora Brasiliensis were initially described by Rodrigues. Cogniaux gave the British botanical artist Harriet Anne Hooker Thiselton-Dyer access to the Rodrigues drawings in his possession, and she copied some 550 of them for the Kew Gardens collection before they were returned to Brazil. Unfortunately, the original drawings disappeared sometime after Rodrigues's death and are now lost, making Thiselton-Dyer's copies a uniquely valuable resource on Rodrigues's work.

In 1875, Rodrigues published Enumeratio Palmarum Novarum, describing a number of new palm taxa. In subsequent years, an English botanist who had met Rodrigues in Brazil, James William Helenus Trail, published some of the same species and even claimed precedence over Rodrigues. Despite this dispute over primacy, which lasted for many years, in 1903, Rodrigues published a classic work on palms, Setum Palmarum Brasiliensis. This was a survey of over 380 species of palms, 166 of which were newly described. Financed by the Brazilian government, it was printed in Belgium and lavishly illustrated with some 170 of Rodrigues's watercolors.

After the Amazon expedition of the 1870s, Rodrigues became discouraged over the difficulty of funding another expedition and briefly detoured into business, running a chemical factory. Not long afterwards, he was tasked to organize and direct a brand-new Botanic Museum of the Amazon in Manaus, which opened in 1883 under the sponsorship of Princess Isabel. He founded a journal, Vellosia (named in honor of José Mariano de Conceição Vellozo), to showcase the museum's work; it was discontinued after only four volumes were issued. Despite its royal patronage, the museum struggled financially and closed in 1890 when Rodrigues moved on to become director of the Botanic Garden of Rio de Janeiro, a position he would hold until his death. At the height of its development, the Botanic Museum of the Amazon had held some 10,000 botanical specimens, nearly all of which were lost on the museum's closure.

During his directorship of the Rio de Janeiro botanic garden, Rodrigues constructed a greenhouse and library, diverted the Monkey River (whose waters tended to flood the garden), opened and landscaped new areas of the garden, planted an arboretum, considerably increased the size of the live plant collection, and took steps towards organizing a herbarium. He started a journal to publish the botanic garden's scientific work, the Contributions du Jardin Botanique du Rio de Janeiro.

Rodrigues died on March 6, 1909.

== Personal life ==
Rodrigues married at the age of 20 but soon lost his wife to tuberculosis. He married again a few years later and once again was quickly widowed, this time being left with a small daughter. His third marriage, to Constança Pacca, lasted many years and produced seven more daughters and six sons. He named the orchid genus Constantia after her.

== Legacy ==
The genera Barbosa, Barbosella, Barbrodria, and Brodriguesia are named after Rodrigues. The Brazilian botanical journal Rodriguésia is also named after him, as is the Barbosa Rodrigues herbarium in Itajaí.

On the centenary of his birth, the João Barbosa Rodrigues Botany Museum was named in his honor; it sits inside the Rio de Janeiro botanic garden.

In 1996, his Iconographie des orchidées du Brésil, which he began working on in the 1860s, was finally published for the first time.
