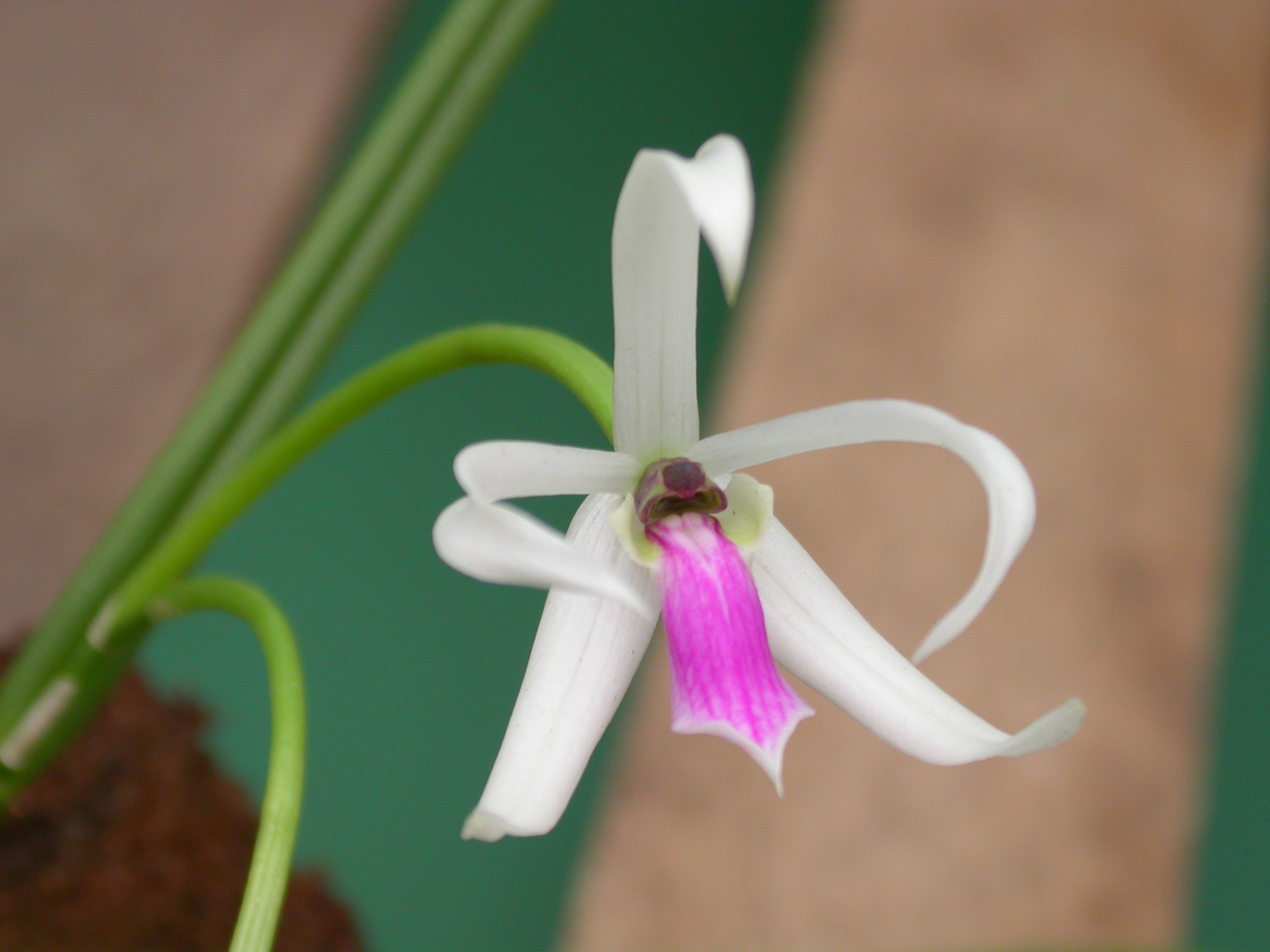
- Leptotes bicolor

Scientific classification
- Kingdom: Plantae
- Clade: Embryophytes
- Clade: Tracheophytes
- Clade: Spermatophytes
- Clade: Angiosperms
- Clade: Monocots
- Order: Asparagales
- Family: Orchidaceae
- Subfamily: Epidendroideae
- Tribe: Epidendreae
- Subtribe: Laeliinae
- Genus: Leptotes; Lindl. 1833

Type species
- Leptotes bicolor Lindl., 1833

= Leptotes (plant) =

Genus of orchids

Leptotes, abbreviated Lpt in horticultural trade, is a genus of orchids formed by nine small species that grow in the dry jungles of south and southeast Brazil, and also in Paraguay or Argentina. They are small epiphytic plants of caespitose growth that sometimes resemble little Brassavola, as they share the same type of thin terete leaves, though they are more closely related to Loefgrenianthus.

Some species of Leptotes are widely cultivated and form showy displays when completely in bloom although they are not among the easiest to grow. The majority of the species are not cultivated and some are so rare to be almost unknown; five of the nine species have been described since 2000. Besides being cultivated for their ornamental value, there are records of the flowers and fruits of Leptotes bicolor being used as a substitute for vanilla in milk, ice cream, tea and candies.

== Distribution ==
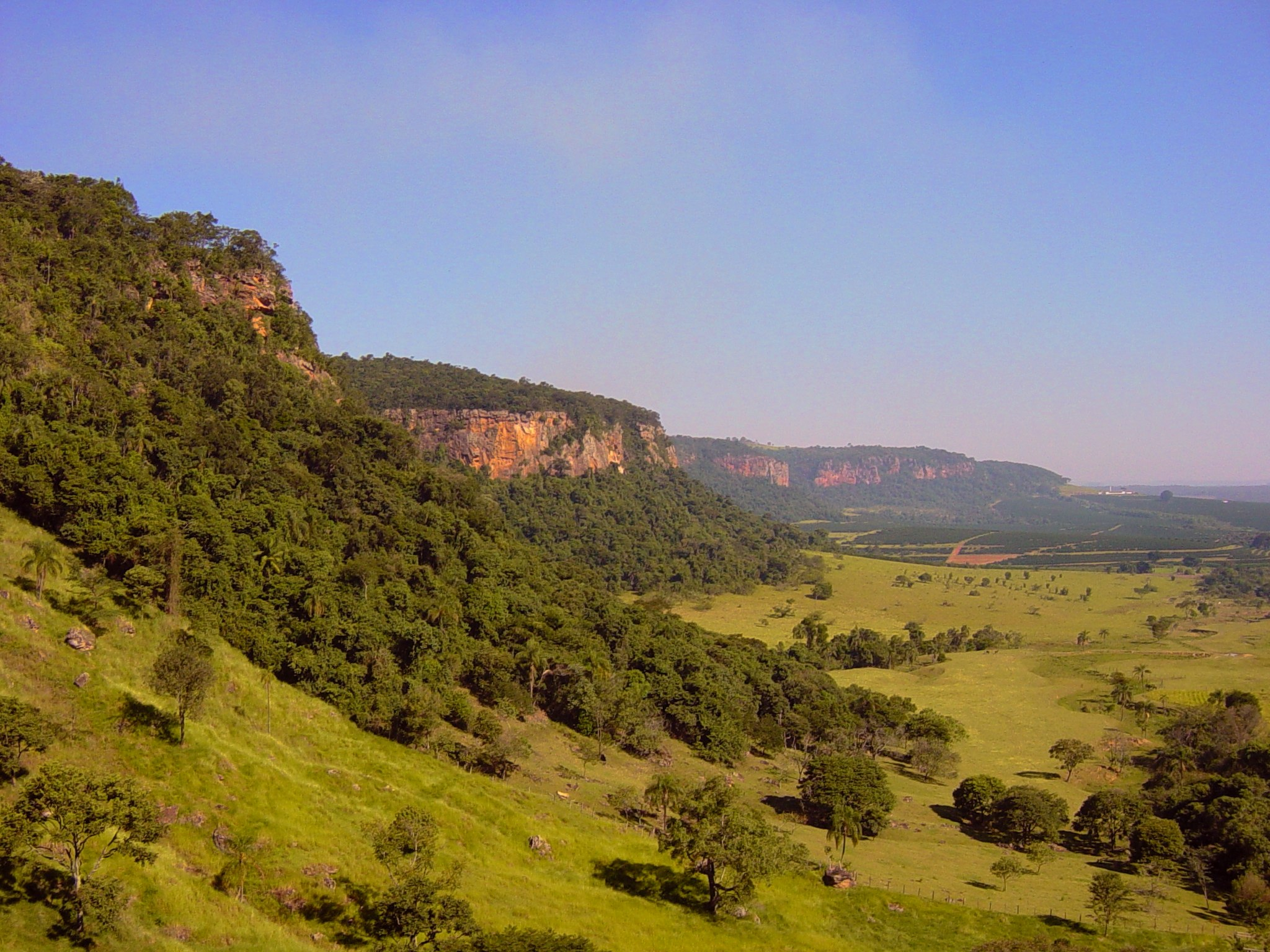
Sandstone cliffs covered by some remaining patches of forest close to Analândia, São Paulo State, Brazil. This is the habitat of Leptotes pauloensis.

The species of Leptotes were originally discovered in the Atlantic Forest of Brazil and are always seen living epiphytically. Two species have since been found in other countries, L. unicolor in Argentina, and L. bicolor in Paraguay. Three species show a high degree of endemism in the south of Bahia State. The states of southeastern Brazil can be considered the center of its distribution since they host the highest number of species and the Leptotes are most abundant there, however, the range is from the Serra da Jibóia chain of mountains, in Bahia, to the North of Rio Grande do Sul state.

The species in the group that are characterized by wide open flowers, such as Leptotes tenuis and L. pauloensis, are more frequently found in montane cloud forests. L. bicolor has the broadest range and can survive in both the cloud forests and the drier woods on the plateaus of the Serra do Mar chain of mountains. Leptotes unicolor grows optimally in cooler areas, above 700 meters of altitude, and is frequently found growing on Araucaria and Podocarpus trees in the southern areas of Brazil.

== Description ==
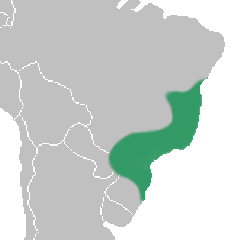
Leptotes distribution map.

Species assigned to the genus Leptotes have a short cylindrical rhizome. They have small pseudobulbs that almost imperceptibly prolongate in one, rarely two, terete fleshy leaves. They have variable characteristics and can be short or long, erect or hanging, dark green or purple, and often have a wrinkly surface and a deeper ridge in the face. The inflorescence is apical, generally short, and grows from the apex of the pseudobulb without a protecting spathe and bears up to seven flowers, although fewer are more common. The flowers are relatively large when compared to the overall plant dimensions, normally partially bent and in some species forming groups with a very showy aspect. They are fragrant and this perfume can last from ten to twenty days.

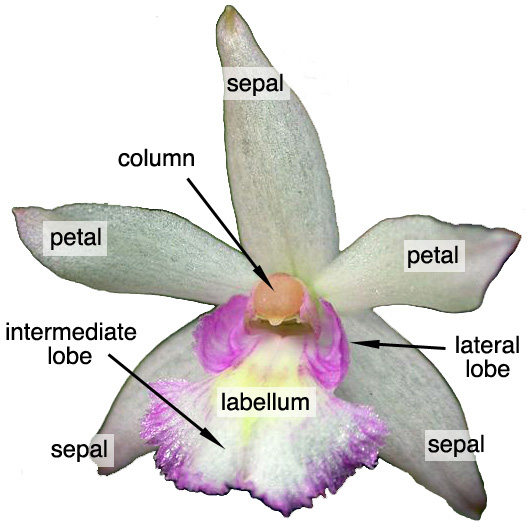
Floral diagram for Leptotes.

The appearance of the petals and sepals is similar, both are elongated although the petals are slightly more narrow. Flower colors are generally greenish, white or variable shades of pink and the labellum (a special petal attractive to pollinators) can be spotted in pale yellow, light purple or lilac. The labellum is located along the column and trilobed (three lobes). The lateral lobes are small and raised beside the column, although never involving it. The intermediate lobe is much bigger and quite variable between species. They can have either lanceolate or obovate shape, occasionally be fleshy, flat or bending backwards; in some species they have denticulated edges but are smooth in others. Rarely, calli are present, with claws holding them attached to the sides of the column. The column is short, thick and erect, normally greenish, biauriculated, and bears six pollinia of different sizes, two larger in the center and four smaller in two pairs held by a short caudicle in an arrangement that is unique among orchids. Their fruits are rounded, succulent and have a perfume reminiscent of vanilla.

The agent for the pollination of Leptotes has never been observed. Cássio van den Berg postulates, judging from the colors and morphology of the flowers, that bees are the primary agent, while other orchidologists suspect pollination by hummingbirds is more important.

As the roots of Leptotes rot easily with excessive humidity, the best results for their culture are achieved when they are mounted on plaques of vegetal fiber or tree cork. Watering and fertilizer must be more frequent during active growth periods and less during dormant periods. Ideal growth conditions require an intermediate temperature and exposure to filtered sunlight.

== Taxonomic notes ==
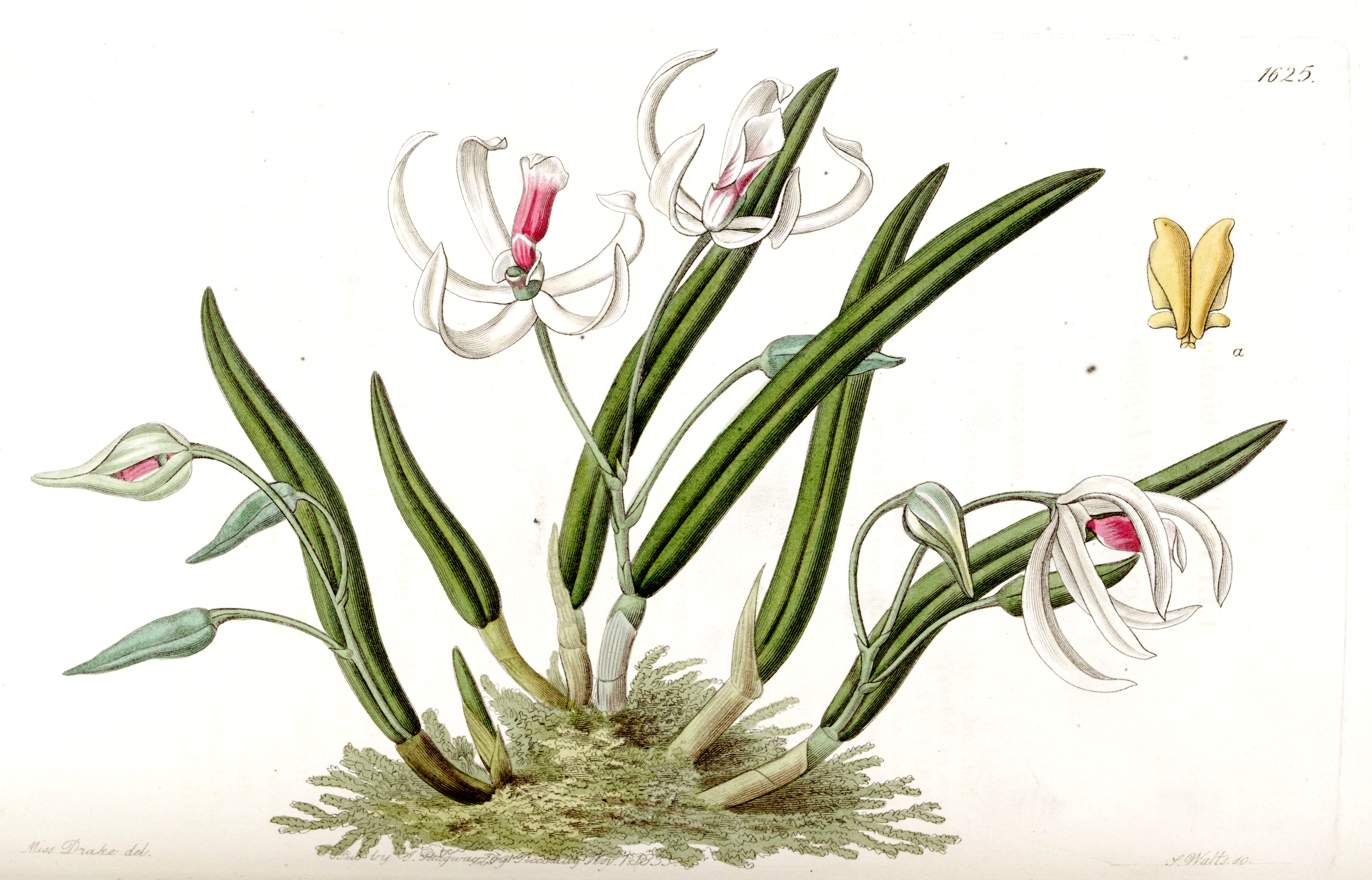
Original illustration published by John Lindley when he described the genus Leptotes, in 1833.

In April 1833, an unknown species from the Serra dos Órgãos mountains of Brazil blossomed in the greenhouse of Mrs. Arnold Harrison, an English collector of orchids homaged in diverse descriptions of noted species such as Bifrenaria harrisoniae and Cattleya harrisoniana. A short time later, Mrs. Harrison sent a drawing and cutting of this plant to the botanist John Lindley, who verified it to be not only a new species but a new genus. In its description, dated the same year, Lindley suggests the name of Leptotes, from the Greek λεπτότητα for mild, delicate, in reference to the appearance of the plant's flowers. He affirmed that Leptotes was similar to Tetramicra, from which it is distinguished by the structures of the pollinarium and by the smaller lateral lobes of the lip petal; and because they have no calcar attached to the ovarium. He also differentiated it from Brassavola by the pollinia and trilobed lip. Lindley then described its type-species, Leptotes bicolor.

In 1838, Lindley received two similar but distinct plants, collected in Macaé de Cima and Ilha Grande, in Rio de Janeiro. He considered them different from the previously described species, because the lateral lobes of the lip were slightly serrated, their flowers were bigger and they occasionally had a second leaf by the pseudobulb; he proposed a new species with the name of Leptotes serrulata. Five years later, the German Count Johann Centurius von Hoffmannsegg noticed that one plant he cultivated had a different green-bluish tone to its leaves and he described the plant calling it L. glaucophylla. When reviewing all the known species of Leptotes at the time, in 1990, Carl Withner revisited the drawings published by Lindley and identified additional differences between L. bicolor and L. serrulata, describing how the latter always bears more flowers, with up to seven per inflorescence, which is also much longer. Today it is accepted, however, that both descriptions are variations of L. bicolor that coexist due to its wide dispersion and multiplicity of populations.

In 1865, Heinrich Gustav Reichenbach received, from an unknown locality in Brazil, the second described species to be accepted today. The plant was quite different from Leptotes bicolor, because of its fewer and smaller rounded flowers, with wide open pale yellowish segments and he published it as L. tenuis. Twelve years later, the third species, Leptotes unicolor, was described by Brazilian botanist João Barbosa Rodrigues. His account described a highly fragrant little species of orchid and he found some colonies with hundreds of plants living epiphytically along the banks of the Dourado and Sapucai rivers, nearby the city of Alfenas, in Minas Gerais. In 1881, Barbosa Rodrigues found another species, this one with longer leaves and slight differences in floral structure, and named it as L. paranaensis after Paraná State where he first found the plant, although today the location near Joinville is located in Santa Catarina. Today this species is considered to be just a variation of L. unicolor, the species he had described four years earlier.

Robert Allen Rolfe received from Brazil, also without information of locality, a plant similar to the Leptotes tenuis species described by Reichenbach over 20 years earlier. Rolfe described it as L. minuta and noted it had much thicker and shorter leaves. This new species was included in Célestin Alfred Cogniaux's revision of Brazilian orchid species, published 1903, but in doing so he was unaware of the variability within the Leptotes species. At the time Cogniaux published his book he had not had the opportunity to check the types of all the other species then described, therefore, he accepted most of them with this remark. In retrospect, it is now more clear that the variation in leaves was due to both the isolation of various populations and because of the different growth conditions in each habitat, and today L. minuta is known as a variation of L. tenuis.

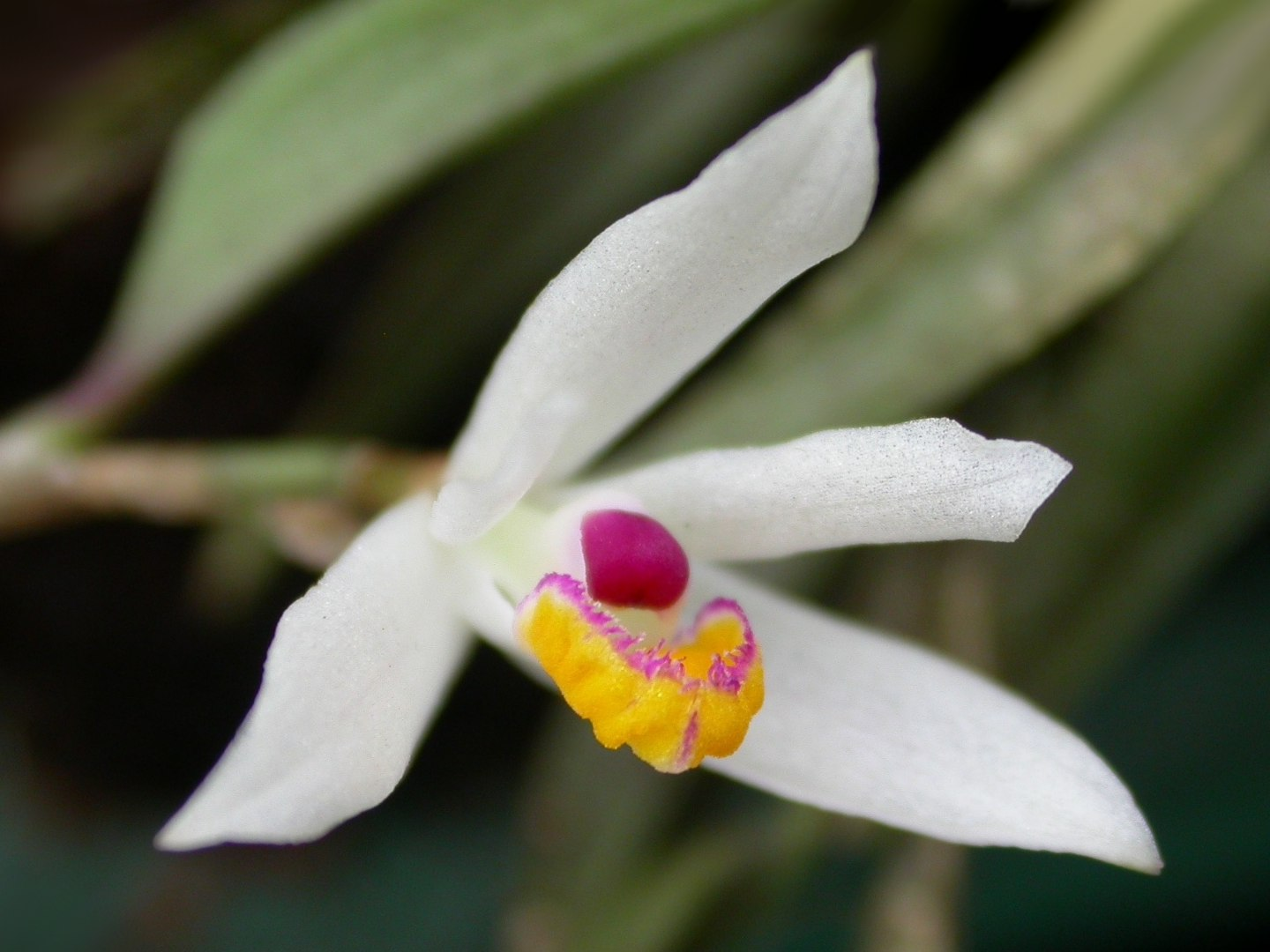
Loefgrenianthus blanche-amesiae, first described under the genus Leptotes, is its closest related species.

While living in Brazil, the Danish Botanist Johan Albert Constantin Löfgren received an Orchid from Itatiaia, Rio de Janeiro, with flowers reminiscent of the Leptotes, although its lip petal formed a pouch. He described it as Leptotes blanche-amesiae, also noting it had a pending habit and thin flat leaves. Later work on the genus by Frederico Carlos Hoehne led him to conclude that this species, despite being closely related to the Leptotes, would be better placed in another genus. He proposed the genus Loefgrenianthus, in hommage to Loefgren. In 1934, Hoehne also described a new species, Leptotes pauloensis, naming it so because it was found in São Paulo State. This species is closely related to Leptotes tenuis but its flowers have different colors. For decades taxonomists were divided on whether this should be considered a new species, partly due to the fact it was so rare, indeed, Guido Pabst considered it a synonym of L. tenuis. Recently many new colonies have been discovered and Withner now proposes that L. pauloensis should be accepted as a separate species.

Consequently, as of 2004, four species of Leptotes were known, three sufficiently different that they can be regarded as well established species, L. bicolor, L. unicolor and L. tenuis, and one, L. pauloensis, that is becoming more frequently accepted by taxonomists.

A recent explosion of descriptions has more than doubled the size of this genus, however, the history of these discoveries starts much earlier. In 1954, one of the associates of Círculo Paulista de Orquidófilos, an orchid society in São Paulo, presented a lecture where he talked informally about the innumerable varieties of Leptotes that he had collected throughout the years. This lecture was printed and distributed in the bulletin of the association. In 2004, Eric Christenson identified at least two of the several varieties mentioned in the lecture to be existing in collections throughout the United States and decided to describe them formally as independent species. One of these plants, Leptotes harryphillipsii, is very similar to L. pauloensis already a problematic species by itself. The other one, L. mogyensis, is unknown to Brazilian scholars and collectors. The sole example is the plant Christenson found in the US, supposedly originated from Mogi das Cruzes, a city nearby São Paulo.

Two other new species described in 2004 belong to the affinity of Leptotes bicolor and were both found by the same surveyor in the region of Buerarema, south of Bahia. Leptotes bohnkiana, named after its finder, can be differentiated because it has a significantly smaller stature, the other, L. pohlitinocoi, mostly by color.

Finally, in 2006 Sidney Marçal de Oliveira discovered the last species to be described, also from Bahia, although an inhabitant of Chapada Diamantina too. This new species, Leptotes vellozicola, is quite distinct from the other species.

According to Cássio van den Berg et al., who studied their phylogeny, Leptotes is very closely related to Loefgrenianthus and both situated between Pseudolaelia and the genus which once used to be classified as Schomburgkia, by some now considered part of Laelia.

== Species ==
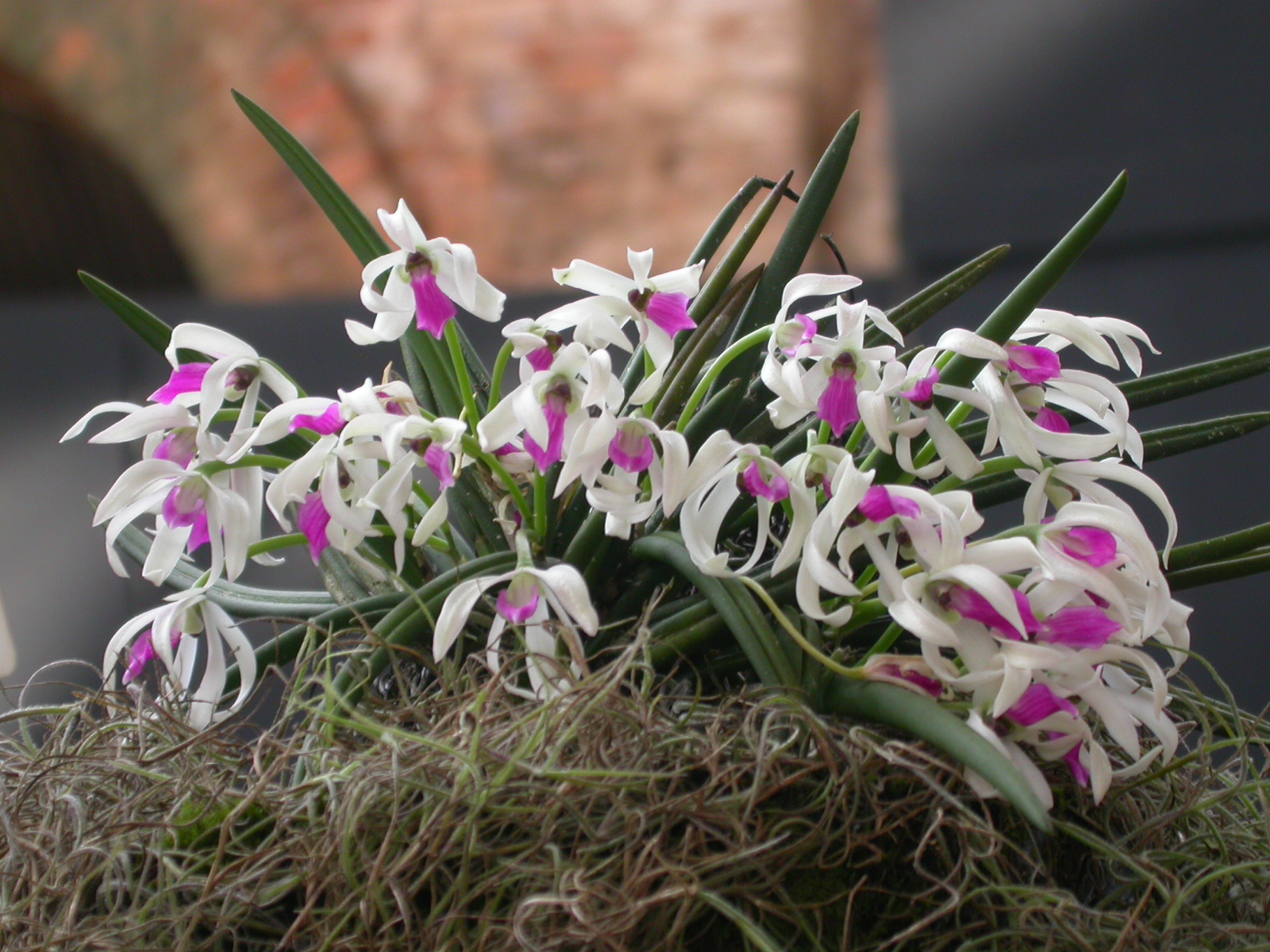
Leptotes bicolor belongs to the group of species with long smooth leaves and bent elongated flowers that do not open well.

The three main characteristics that differentiate between the species of Leptotes are the general proportions of the leaves, the shape of the flowers, and the way the flowers open. From these, the species can be classified into two main groups.

One group is formed by the four species with flowers of elongated segments, which generally are not widely open. These species present malleable inflorescences that leave the flowers slightly or very overthrown, frequently facing down. Almost all the species of this group have long leaves, of comparatively lighter tones, generally with smooth surfaces, that are longer than the inflorescences.

Image	Name	Description	Distribution	Elevation (m)
	Leptotes unicolor Rchb.f.	the exception in this group, as it has short, wrinkly and dark leaves. Its flowers, of generally uniform pale pink, always face down. The other species of this group have flowers of stronger colors.	Brazil, Argentina and Paraguay	
	Leptotes bicolor Lindl.	the species with more flowers per inflorescence and with a wider distribution. It is a variable species, even though it is easily identified because of its bicolored flowers, white sepals and petals and purple lip; occasionally it will bear two leaves per pseudobulb. There are some records of this species living as a lithophyte.	Paraguay and Brazil	500–900 metres (1,600–3,000 ft)
	Leptotes bohnkiana Campacci	has some similarities to L. bicolor, however, its flowers are one third of the size, with petals and sepals that are proportionally wider, and the adult plant is about half the size. It bears a single flower per inflorescence.	Brazil (Bahia)	800–1,000 metres (2,600–3,300 ft)
	Leptotes pohlitinocoi V.P.Castro & Chiron	is closer to L. bicolor but has slightly smaller flowers with all segments completely pink. It only exists in Bahia.	Brazil (Bahia).	500–800 metres (1,600–2,600 ft)

The other group is formed by five smaller species that have more rounded flowers with petals and sepals that are wide open and flatter. The leaves are shorter wrinkly leaves, generally very dark green or purple colored. The species of this group often have only one or two flowers on each inflorescence. Four of them are very similar and sometimes difficult to distinguish.

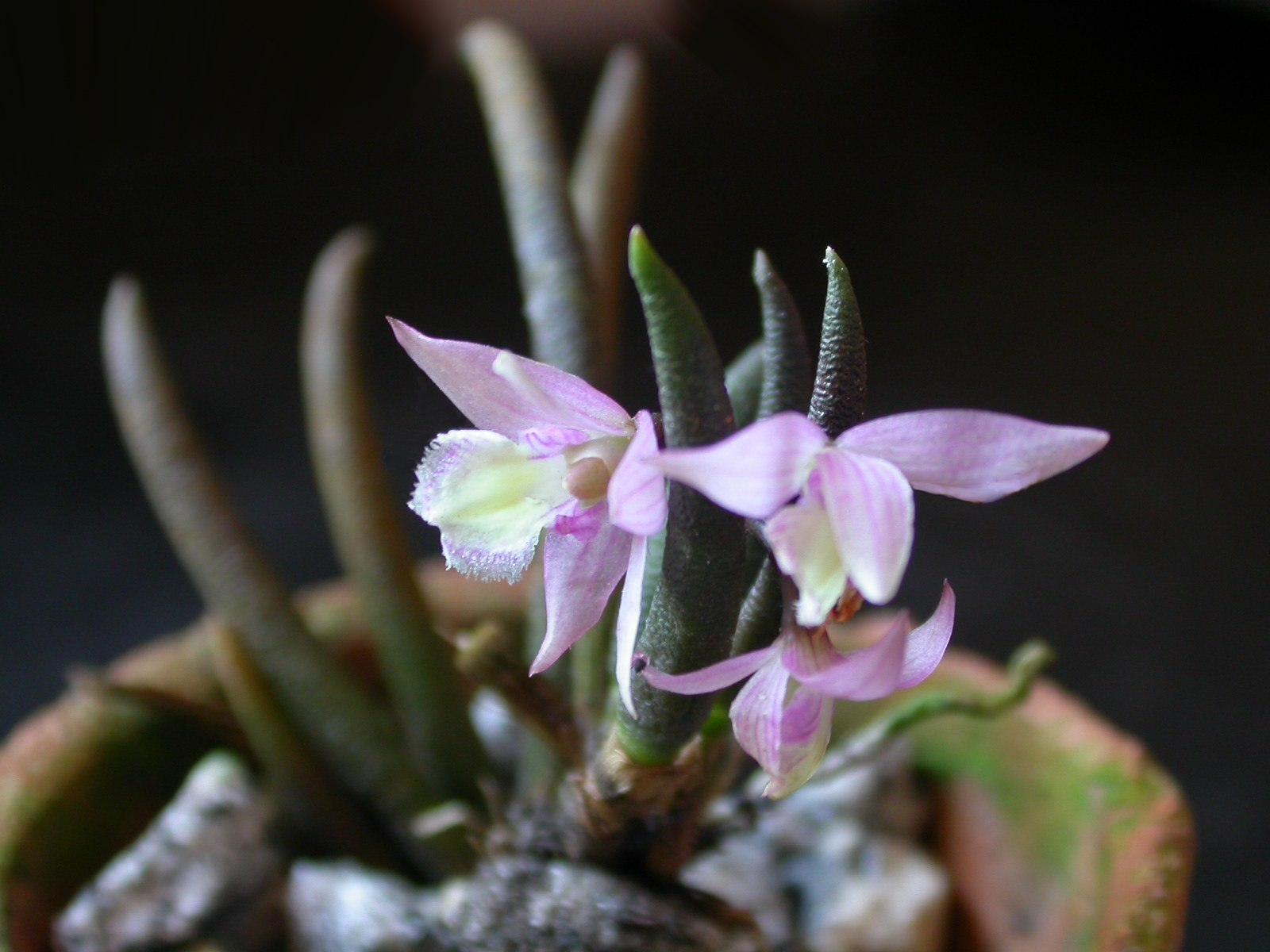
Leptotes harryphillipsii is a member of the Leptotes group of species with short wrinkled leaves and few wide open flowers.

Image	Name	Description	Distribution	Elevation (m)
	Leptotes vellozicola Van den Berg, E.C.Smidt & Marçal	the only easily recognizable species in this group as it has a thick central callus next to the apex of the lip petal. It is the only species of this group endemic to Bahia, the other species are from southeast and south Brazil. This species, among all Leptotes, takes the most sunlight in the wild because it is epiphytic on Vellozia, a species with very few leaves. The region where it lives is much drier compared to the areas inhabited by the other species.	Brazil (Bahia)	
	Leptotes tenuis Rchb.f.	the only Leptotes species with pale green, yellowish or white flowers and lilac colored lip. It is a very small and uncommon species from southeastern Brazil.	Brazil (Espirito Santo, Rio de Janeiro, Sao Paulo and Minas Gerais)	700–1,000 metres (2,300–3,300 ft)
	Leptotes pauloensis Hoehne	a species very similar to L. tenuis and can be separated from it mainly by the opposite distribution of color between the lip and the other sepals and petals, namely, pale lilac petals and sepals and white lip with a yellowish cream mark in the middle. Its distribution overlaps L. tenuis but extends much more into the south.	Brazil (Espirito Santo, Rio de Janeiro, Sao Paulo, Parana and Santa Catarina)	700–1,000 metres (2,300–3,300 ft)
	Leptotes harryphillipsii Christenson	another species similar to L. tenuis, but with a slightly longer lip and discrete pink stripes on the other petals and sepals, which typically have more vibrant colors. It seems this species has been known for long time but had always been confused with L. pauloensis.	Brazil	
	Leptotes mogyensis Krackow. ex Christenson	yet another species related to the L. tenuis group and also resembles L. unicolor except it has white flowers with a deep purple central mark on the lip. There is no record of this plant in the wild. All information comes from a plant found under cultivation in a nursery in California, USA. It might be a rare natural hybrid of the two mentioned species.	Brazil	
