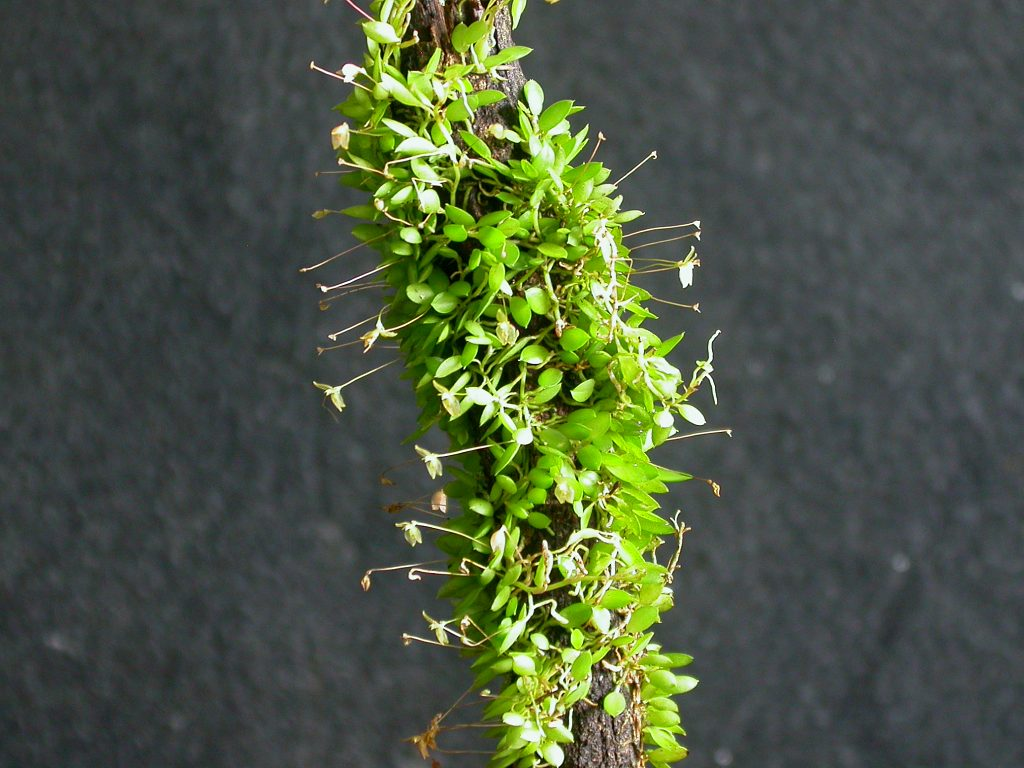

Scientific classification
- Kingdom: Plantae
- Clade: Tracheophytes
- Clade: Angiosperms
- Clade: Monocots
- Order: Asparagales
- Family: Orchidaceae
- Subfamily: Epidendroideae
- Genus: Barbosella
- Species: B. miersii

Binomial name
- Barbosella miersii (Lindl.) Schltr. (1918)

Synonyms
- Pleurothallis miersii Lindl.; Restrepia miersii (Lindl.) Rchb.f. in H.R.von Fernsee Wawra; Humboltia miersii (Lindl.) Kuntze; Barbrodria miersii (Lindl.) Luer

= Barbosella miersii =

Species of orchid

Barbosella miersii is a species of orchid endemic to Brazil. It is known from the States of São Paulo, Paraná and Rio Grande do Sul
