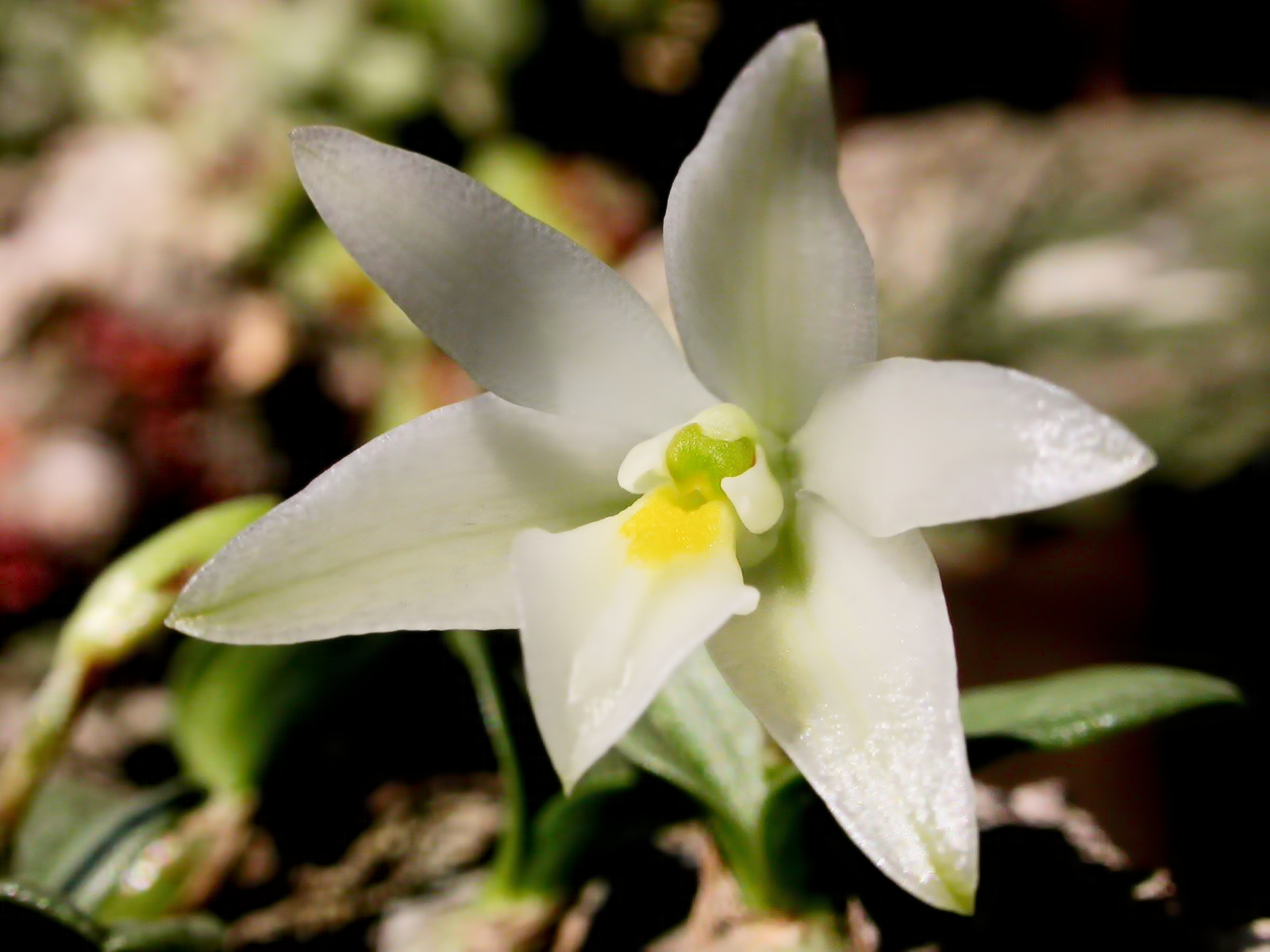
- Constantia cipoensis

Scientific classification
- Kingdom: Plantae
- Clade: Tracheophytes
- Clade: Angiosperms
- Clade: Monocots
- Order: Asparagales
- Family: Orchidaceae
- Subfamily: Epidendroideae
- Tribe: Epidendreae
- Subtribe: Laeliinae
- Genus: Constantia; Barb.Rodr.

Type species
- Constantia rupestris Barb.Rodr.

= Constantia (plant) =

Genus of orchids

Constantia is a genus of flowering plants from the orchid family, Orchidaceae. It contains 6 known species, all endemic to Brazil:

- Constantia australis (Cogn.) Porto & Brade - Santa Catarina
- Constantia cipoensis Porto & Brade - Minas Gerais
- Constantia cristinae F.E.L.Miranda - Minas Gerais
- Constantia gutfreundiana Chiron & V.P.Castro - Minas Gerais
- Constantia microscopica F.E.L.Miranda - Minas Gerais
- Constantia rupestris Barb.Rodr. - Rio de Janeiro

== See also ==
- List of Orchidaceae genera
