= Cássio van den Berg =

Brazilian botanist

Cássio van den Berg (born 1971) is a Brazilian botanist, noted for work in orchid classification and evolution, especially great changes in the generic circumscriptions of ornamental orchids in the genus Cattleya, based on DNA studies for the subtribe Laeliinae.

== Career ==
Based on DNA studies, he proposed a fusion of the genera Cattleya and Sophronitis, and also included in this genus the Brazilian species of Laelia. In Laeliinae, the studies pointed out to the separation of subtribe Ponerinae, and the transfer of Dilomilis and Neocogniauxia to Pleurothallidinae. He also worked in the taxonomy of other orchid genera, such as Acianthera, Baptistonia (synonym of Oncidium), Bulbophyllum, Cymbidium, Encyclia, Galeandra, Isabelia and Pleione. In 2004, he described a new genus of Laeliinae, Adamantinia Van den Berg & C.N.Gonç. Currently he is full professor and curator of the Laboratory of Plant Molecular Systematics. at Universidade Estadual de Feira de Santana, Bahia, Brazil.

He has published over 250 botanical names and combinations, especially on orchids.
