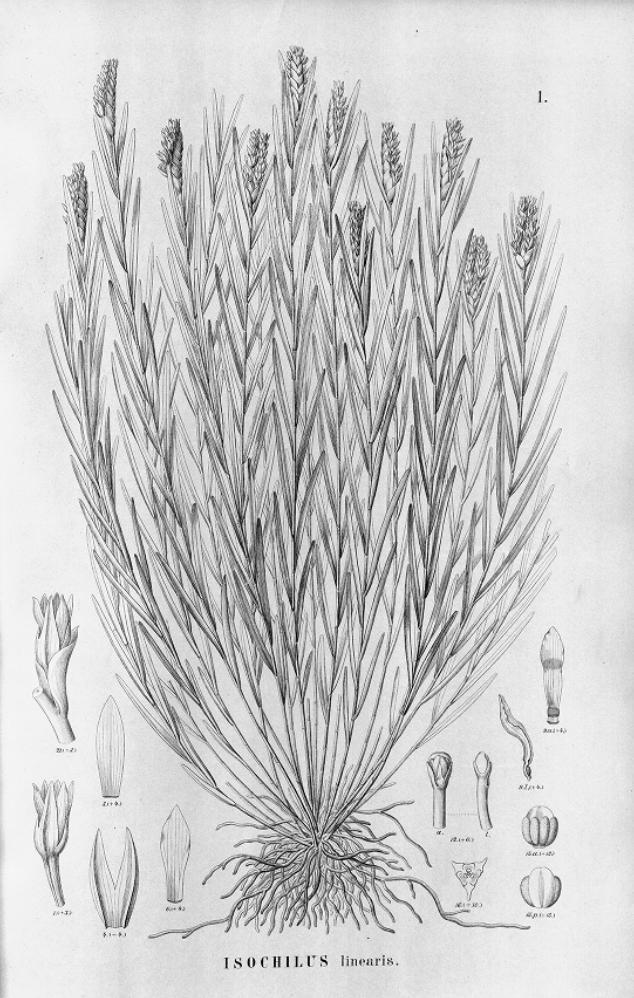
- Isochilus linearis, illustration

Scientific classification
- Kingdom: Plantae
- Clade: Tracheophytes
- Clade: Angiosperms
- Clade: Monocots
- Order: Asparagales
- Family: Orchidaceae
- Subfamily: Epidendroideae
- Tribe: Epidendreae
- Subtribe: Ponerinae
- Genus: Isochilus; R.Br.

Species
- Isochilus aurantiacus; Isochilus carnosiflorus; Isochilus linearis; Isochilus major; etc.

= Isochilus =

Genus of orchids

Isochilus is a genus of orchids (family Orchidaceae) with 13 recognized species. They are lowland epiphytes mainly found in Central America, from Cuba and Mexico to Argentina.

Characteristics of this genus include slender canelike stems with narrow distichous flat leaves and small sessile tube flowers carried at the tip of the cane.

== Species ==
- I. alatus
- I. amparoanus, syn. I. chiriquensis
- I. aurantiacus
- I. bracteatus
- I. brasiliensis, syn. I. linearis
- I. carnosiflorus
- I. cernuus, syn. Jacquiniella cernua
- I. chiriquensis
- I. crassiflorus, syn. I. carnosifloruu
- I. dubius, syn. Scaphyglottis livida
- I. elegans, syn. Dimerandra elegans
- I. fusiformis, syn. Epidendrum fusiforme
- I. globosus, syn. Jacquiniella globosa
- I. graminifolius, syn. Maxillariella graminifolia
- I. graminoides, syn. Dichaea graminoides
- I. grandiflorum
- I. grandiflorus, syn. Maxillariella cassapensis
- I. lancifolius
- I. langlassei
- I. latibracteatus
- I. leucanthus, syn I. linearis
- I. linearis
- I. linifolius, syn Elleanthus linifolius
- I. lividus, syn. Scaphyglottis livida
- I. major
- I. oaxacanus
- I. pauciflorus, syn. Scaphyglottis dunstervillei
- I. peruvianus, syn. I. linearis
- I. pitalensis
- I prolifer
- I. proliferus, syn. Scaphyglottis prolifera
- I. proliferum
- I. ramosus, syn. Epidendrum ramosum
- I. smithii
- I. teretifolius, syn. Jacquiniella teretifolia
- I. unilateralis
