= H. bidentata =

H. bidentata may refer to:

- Heterocrita bidentata, a geometer moth
- Hexisea bidentata, an orchid of the Americas
- Hovanuncia bidentata, a harvestman first described in 1959
