= Paxiúba =

Paxiúba may refer to:

== Geography ==
- Paxiúba River, a tributary of the Aripuanã River in Mato Grosso, Brazil

== Plants ==
- Socratea exorrhiza
- Iriartea
