= S. imbricata =

S. imbricata may refer to:

- Scaphyglottis imbricata, an orchid species found from Mexico to northern and western South America
- Salsola imbricata, a synonym of Caroxylon imbricatum, a shrub species

== Synonyms ==
- Stypandra imbricata, a synonym for Stypandra glauca, a flowering plant species

== See also ==
- Imbricata
