= S. floribunda =

S. floribunda may refer to:

- Scaevola floribunda, a plant endemic to Fiji
- Scaphyglottis floribunda, a New World orchid
- Scrophularia floribunda, a herbaceous plant
- Soyauxia floribunda, an African plant
- Stephanotis floribunda, a plant native to Madagascar
- Styphelia floribunda, an Oceanian heather
- Sutera floribunda, a herbaceous plant
- Swartzia floribunda, a tropical legume
- Swintonia floribunda, a drupe-bearing plant
- Synaphea floribunda, a plant endemic to Western Australia
