= S. bidentata =

S. bidentata may refer to:

- Scaphyglottis bidentata, an orchid of the Americas
- Stelis bidentata, an orchid first described in 1912
- Styringomyia bidentata, a crane fly
- Succisa bidentata, a flowering plant
