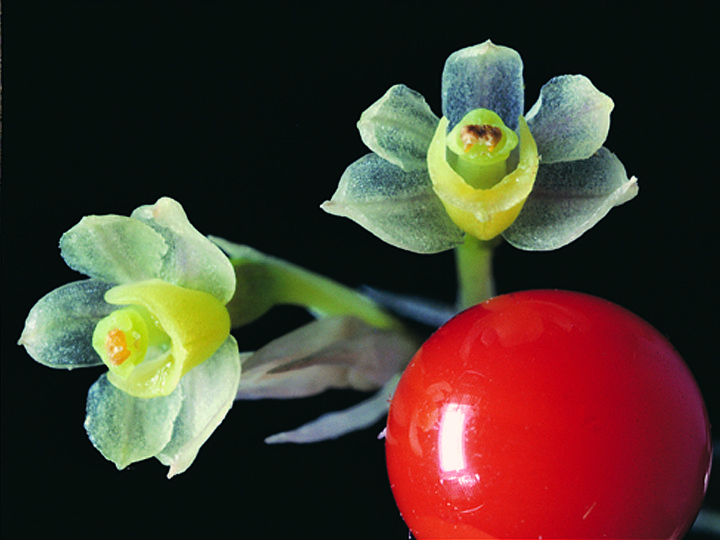
- Flower of Scaphyglottis micrantha

Scientific classification
- Kingdom: Plantae
- Clade: Tracheophytes
- Clade: Angiosperms
- Clade: Monocots
- Order: Asparagales
- Family: Orchidaceae
- Subfamily: Epidendroideae
- Genus: Scaphyglottis
- Species: S. micrantha

Binomial name
- Scaphyglottis micrantha (Lindl.) Ames & Correll

Synonyms
- Hexadesmia micrantha Lindl. (basionym); Epidendrum micranthum Lindl.; Pseudohexadesmia micrantha (Lindl.) Brieger

= Scaphyglottis micrantha =

Species of orchid

Scaphyglottis micrantha is a species of orchid found from Central America to northwestern Ecuador.
