= Scaphyglottis atwoodii =

Scientific classification
- Kingdom: Plantae
- Clade: Tracheophytes
- Clade: Angiosperms
- Clade: Monocots
- Order: Asparagales
- Family: Orchidaceae
- Subfamily: Epidendroideae
- Genus: Scaphyglottis
- Species: S. atwoodii

Binomial name
- Scaphyglottis atwoodii Dressler

Synonyms
- Scaphyglottis gracilis sensu Atwood 1989, non Schlechter 1923

Species of orchid

Scaphyglottis atwoodii is a species of epiphytic orchid from Costa Rica. It is known from only one location at Finca de Selva, 3 km east of Puerto Viejo de Sarapiquí.

Scaphyglottis atwoodii is an epiphytic herb with stems up to 20 cm long. Leaves are oblong to elliptical, up to 10 cm long. Flowers solitary or in small clusters. Sepals narrowly lanceolate, up to 2 mm long. Petals are up to 6 mm long. Lip 3-lobed, the lateral lobes up to 2 mm long, the central lobe rhombic or flabellate, the tip bent upward.
