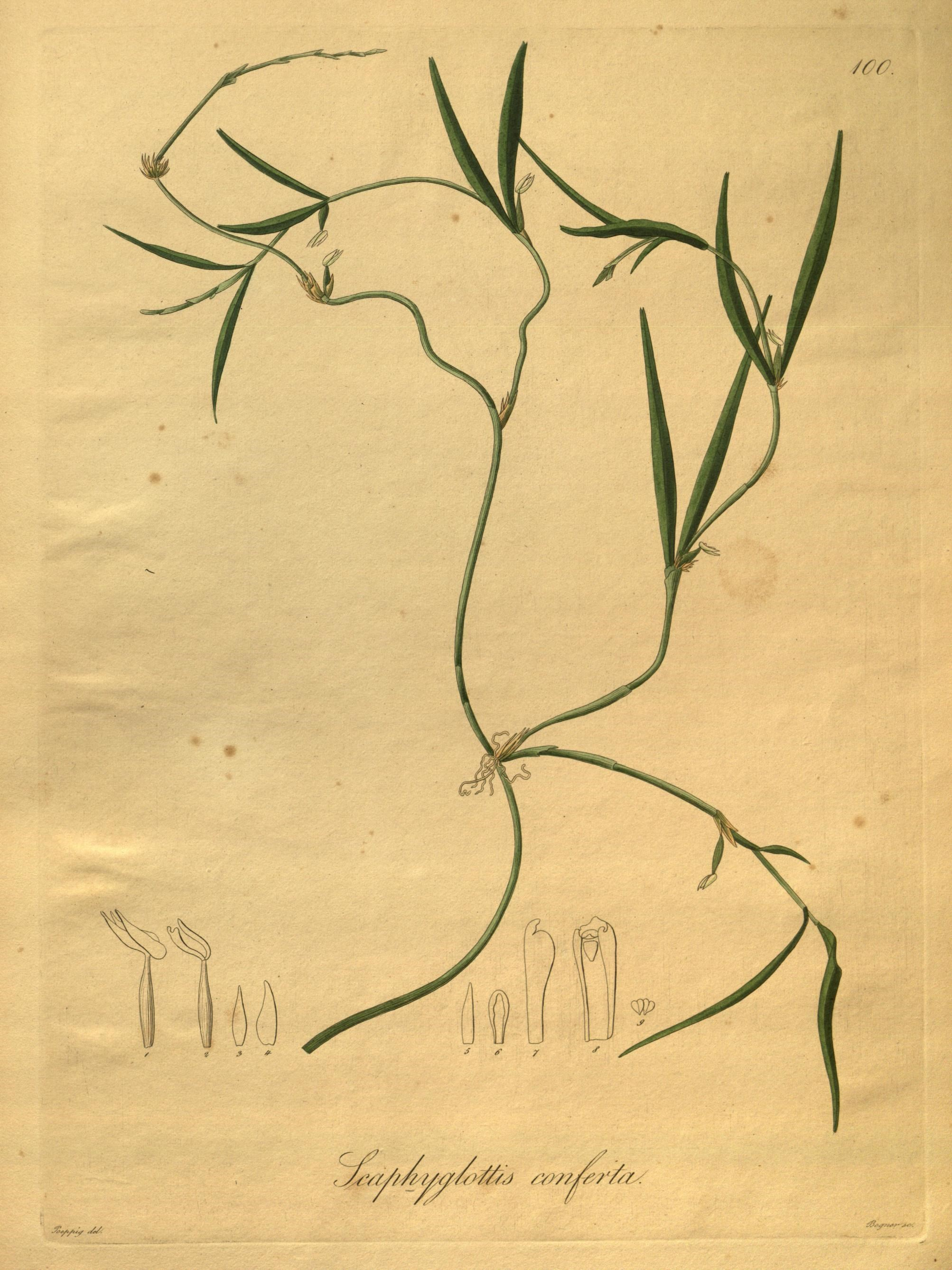
- Illustration of Scaphyglottis conferta

Scientific classification
- Kingdom: Plantae
- Clade: Tracheophytes
- Clade: Angiosperms
- Clade: Monocots
- Order: Asparagales
- Family: Orchidaceae
- Subfamily: Epidendroideae
- Genus: Scaphyglottis
- Species: S. conferta

Binomial name
- Scaphyglottis conferta (Ruiz & Pav.) Poepp. & Endl.

Synonyms
- Fernandezia conferta Ruiz & Pav. (basionym); Ponera conferta (Ruiz & Pav.) Rchb.f.

= Scaphyglottis conferta =

Species of orchid

Scaphyglottis conferta is a species of orchid in the family Orchidaceae. It is endemic to Peru.
