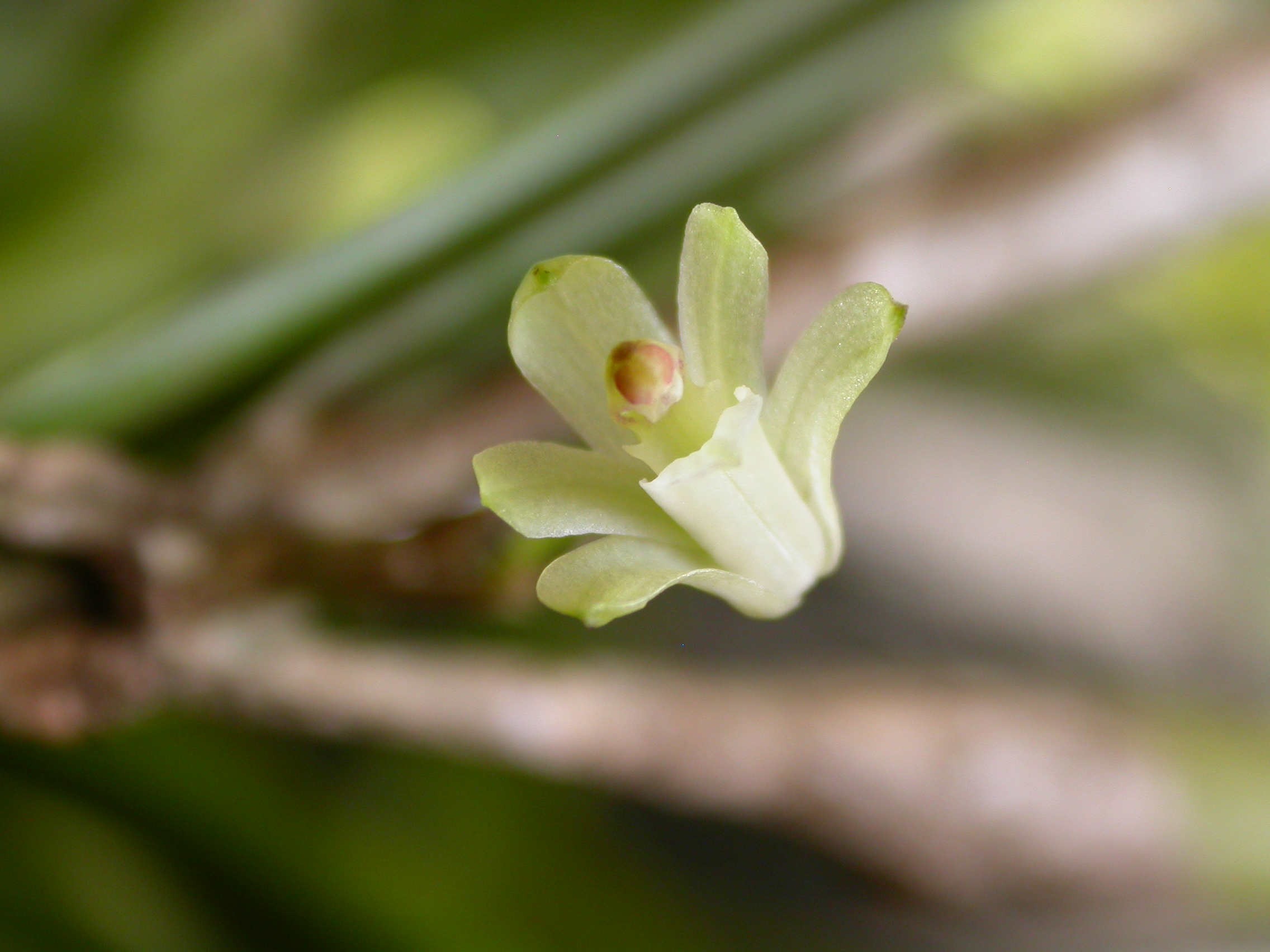
- Flower of Scaphyglottis fusiformis

Scientific classification
- Kingdom: Plantae
- Clade: Tracheophytes
- Clade: Angiosperms
- Clade: Monocots
- Order: Asparagales
- Family: Orchidaceae
- Subfamily: Epidendroideae
- Genus: Scaphyglottis
- Species: S. fusiformis

Binomial name
- Scaphyglottis fusiformis (Griseb.) R.E.Schult.

Synonyms
- Hexadesmia fusiformis Griseb. (basionym); Hexadesmia brachyphylla Rchb.f.; Hexadesmia cearensis Schltr.; Hexadesmia brachyphylla var. longior Schltr.; Scaphyglottis bilobulata Schltr.; Scaphyglottis brachyphylla (Rchb.f.) C.Schweinf.

= Scaphyglottis fusiformis =

Species of orchid

Scaphyglottis fusiformis is a species of flowering plant in the family Orchidaceae. It is found from Costa Rica to tropical South America.
