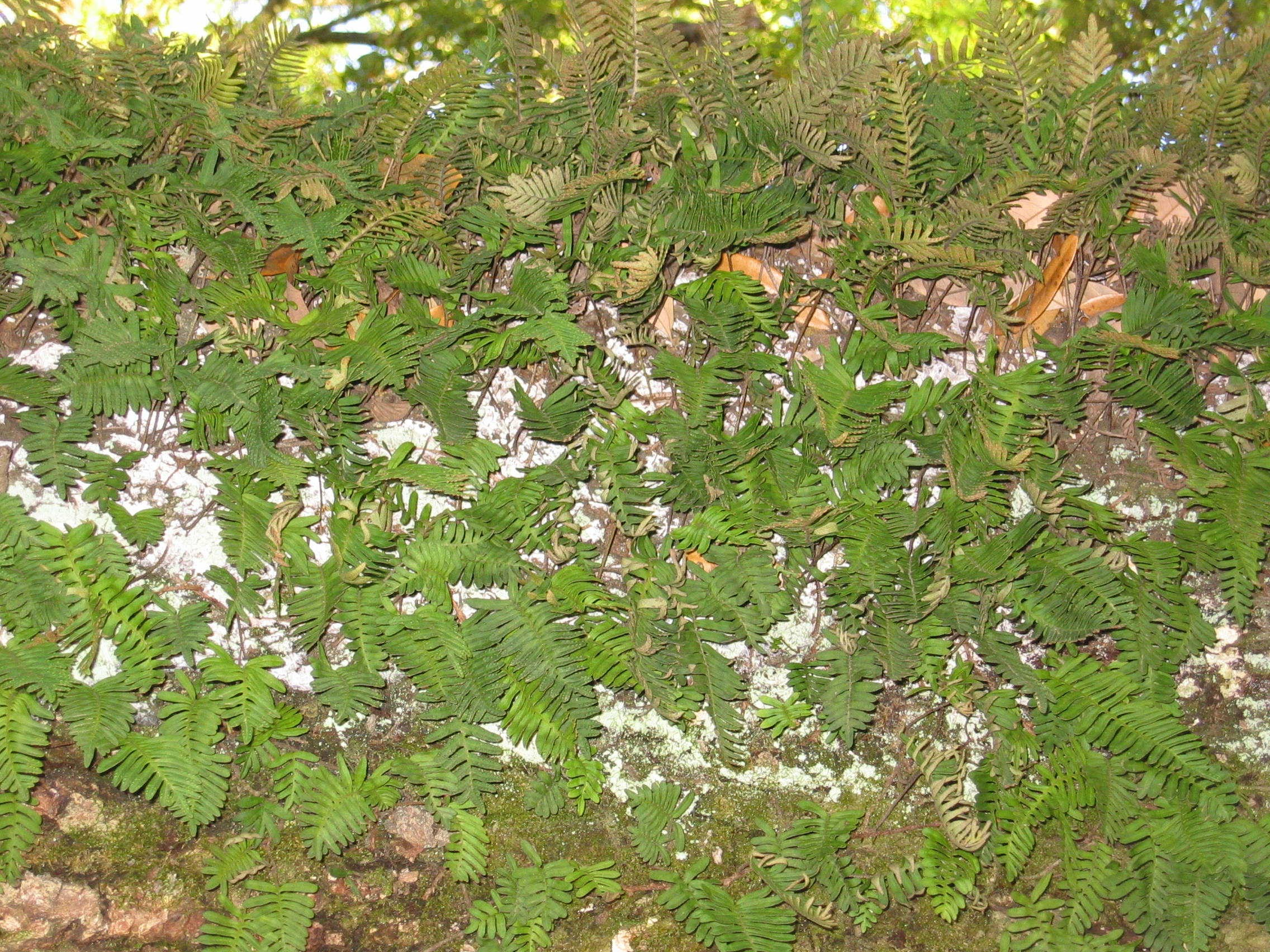
- Pleopeltis polypodioides growing on a tree branch

Scientific classification
- Kingdom: Plantae
- Clade: Tracheophytes
- Division: Polypodiophyta
- Class: Polypodiopsida
- Order: Polypodiales
- Suborder: Polypodiineae
- Family: Polypodiaceae
- Subfamily: Polypodioideae
- Genus: Pleopeltis; Humb. & Bonpl. ex Willd.

Species
- See text.

Synonyms
- Ampelopteris Klotzsch; Cheilogramma Maxon; Chilogramme Blume; Cuspidaria Fée; Dicranoglossum J.Sm.; Eschatogramme Trevis.; Heteropteris Diels, nom. superfl.; Heteropteris Fée; Lepicystis (J.Sm.) J.Sm.; Marginaria Bory; Marginariopsis C.Chr.; Microphlebodium L.D.Gómez; Neurodium Fée; Paltomium C.Presl, nom. superfl.; × Pleopodium Schelpe & N.C.Anthony; Pseudocolysis L.D.Gómez

= Pleopeltis =

Genus of ferns

Pleopeltis is a genus of ferns in the family Polypodiaceae, subfamily Polypodioideae, according to the Pteridophyte Phylogeny Group classification of 2016 (PPG I). The genus widely distributed in tropical regions of the world, and also north into temperate regions in eastern North America and eastern Asia. Several species are known by the common name scaly polypody and resurrection fern.

The genus is closely related to Polypodium. Many of the species have been or sometimes are still included in that genus. Further changes in the circumscription of the genus may occur as research continues.

They are epiphytic, epipetric (growing on rocks), or rarely terrestrial ferns, with a creeping, densely hairy or scaly rhizome bearing fronds at intervals along its length. The fronds are evergreen, persisting for 1–2 years, and are entire or deeply pinnatifid. The sori or groups of spore-cases (sporangia) are borne on the back of the frond.

== Species ==
As of February 2020, Checklist of Ferns and Lycophytes of the World accepted the following species and hybrids:

- Pleopeltis acicularis (Weath.) A.R.Sm. & T.Krömer
- Pleopeltis alansmithii (R.C.Moran) A.R.Sm. & Tejero
- Pleopeltis alborufula (Brade) Salino
- Pleopeltis angusta Humb. & Bonpl. ex Willd.
- Pleopeltis appressa M.Kessler & A.R.Sm.
- Pleopeltis × aspidiolepis (Baker) A.R.Sm.
- Pleopeltis astrolepis (Liebm.) E.Fourn.
- Pleopeltis aturensis (Maury) A.R.Sm.
- Pleopeltis balaonensis (Hieron.) A.R.Sm.
- Pleopeltis ballivianii (Rosenst.) A.R.Sm.
- Pleopeltis × bartlettii (Weath.) A.R.Sm. & Tejero
- Pleopeltis bombycina (Maxon) A.R.Sm.
- Pleopeltis bradei (de la Sota) Salino
- Pleopeltis bradeorum (Rosenst.) A.R.Sm. & Tejero
- Pleopeltis buchtienii (Christ & Rosenst.) A.R.Sm.
- Pleopeltis burchellii (Baker) Hickey & Sprunt ex A.R.Sm.
- Pleopeltis × cerro-altoensis Danton & Boudrie
- Pleopeltis christensenii A.R.Sm.
- Pleopeltis coenosora R.C.Moran
- Pleopeltis collinsii (Maxon) A.R.Sm. & Tejero
- Pleopeltis complanata (Weath.) E.A.Hooper
- Pleopeltis constricta Sprunt & Hickey
- Pleopeltis conzattii (Weath.) R.M.Tryon & A.F.Tryon
- Pleopeltis crassinervata (Fée) T.Moore
- Pleopeltis cryptocarpa (Fée) A.R.Sm. & Tejero
- Pleopeltis desvauxii (Klotzsch) Salino
- Pleopeltis disjuncta M.Kessler & A.R.Sm.
- Pleopeltis ecklonii (Kunze) A.R.Sm.
- Pleopeltis fallacissima (Maxon) A.R.Sm. & Tejero
- Pleopeltis fallax (Schltdl. & Cham.) Mickel & Beitel
- Pleopeltis fayorum (R.C.Moran & B. Øllg.) A.R.Sm.
- Pleopeltis fimbriata (Maxon) A.R.Sm.
- Pleopeltis fossa Moore
- Pleopeltis fraseri (Kuhn) A.R.Sm.
- Pleopeltis friedrichsthaliana (Kunze) A.R.Sm. & Tejero
- Pleopeltis fructuosa (Maxon & Weath.) Lellinger
- Pleopeltis furcata (L.) A.R.Sm.
- Pleopeltis furfuracea (Schltdl. & Cham.) A.R.Sm. & Tejero
- Pleopeltis guttata (Maxon) E.G.Andrews & Windham
- Pleopeltis gyroflexa (Christ) Schwartsb. (syn. P. repanda)
- Pleopeltis hirsutissima (Raddi) de la Sota
- Pleopeltis hookeri A.R.Sm.
- Pleopeltis insularum (C.V.Morton) A.R.Sm.
- Pleopeltis intermedia M.Kessler & A.R.Sm.
- Pleopeltis lepidopteris (Langsd. & Fisch.) de la Sota
- Pleopeltis lepidotricha (Fée) A.R.Sm. & Tejero
- Pleopeltis × leucospora (Klotzsch) Moore
- Pleopeltis lindeniana (Kunze) A.R.Sm. & Tejero
- Pleopeltis macrocarpa (Bory ex Willd.) Kaulf.
- Pleopeltis macrolepis (Maxon) A.R.Sm. & Tejero
- Pleopeltis madrensis (J.Sm.) A.R.Sm. & Tejero
- Pleopeltis marginata A.R.Sm. & Tejero
- Pleopeltis masafuerae (Phil.) de la Sota
- Pleopeltis megalolepis (Maxon & C.V.Morton) A.R.Sm.
- Pleopeltis × melanoneura Mickel & Beitel
- Pleopeltis mexicana (Fée) Mickel & Beitel
- Pleopeltis michauxiana (Weath.) Hickey & Sprunt
- Pleopeltis microgrammoides (Mickel & A.R.Sm.) A.R.Sm. & Tejero
- Pleopeltis minarum (Weath.) Salino
- Pleopeltis minima (Bory) J.Prado & R.Y.Hirai
- Pleopeltis monoides (Weath.) Salino
- Pleopeltis monosora (Desv.) A.R.Sm.
- Pleopeltis montigena (Maxon) A.R.Sm. & Tejero
- Pleopeltis munchii (Christ) A.R.Sm.
- Pleopeltis murorum (Hook.) A.R.Sm. & Tejero
- Pleopeltis myriolepis (Christ) A.R.Sm. & Tejero
- Pleopeltis nicklesii (Tardieu) Alston
- Pleopeltis oreophila Sundue
- Pleopeltis orientalis Sundue
- Pleopeltis panamensis (Weath.) Pic. Serm.
- Pleopeltis pinnatifida Gill.
- Pleopeltis × pinnatisecta (Brade) A.R.Sm.
- Pleopeltis platylepis (Mett. ex Kuhn) A.R.Sm. & Tejero
- Pleopeltis plebeia (Schltdl. & Cham.) A.R.Sm. & Tejero
- Pleopeltis pleopeltidis (Fée) de la Sota
- Pleopeltis pleopeltifolia (Raddi) Alston
- Pleopeltis polylepis (Roem. ex Kunze) T.Moore
- Pleopeltis polypodioides (L.) E.G.Andrews & Windham
- Pleopeltis pycnocarpa (C.Chr.) A.R.Sm.
- Pleopeltis pyrrholepis (Fée) A.R.Sm. & Tejero
- Pleopeltis remota (Desv.) A.R.Sm.
- Pleopeltis riograndensis (T.Wendt) E.G.Andrews & Windham
- Pleopeltis rosei (Maxon) A.R.Sm. & Tejero
- Pleopeltis rzedowskiana (Mickel) A.R.Sm. & Tejero
- Pleopeltis sanctae-rosae (Maxon) A.R.Sm. & Tejero
- Pleopeltis segregata (Baker) A.R.Sm.
- Pleopeltis × simiana (Schelpe & N.C.Anthony) N.R.Crouch & Klopper
- Pleopeltis × sordidula (Maxon & Weath.) Mickel & Beitel
- Pleopeltis squamata (L.) J.Sm.
- Pleopeltis steirolepis (C.Chr.) A.R.Sm.
- Pleopeltis stolzei A.R.Sm.
- Pleopeltis subnuda (C.Chr.) A.R.Sm.
- Pleopeltis subvestita (Maxon) A.R.Sm.
- Pleopeltis thyssanolepis (A.Braun ex Klotzsch) E.G.Andrews & Windham
- Pleopeltis tico (A.Rojas) A.R.Sm.
- Pleopeltis × tricholepis (Mickel & Beitel) A.R.Sm. & Tejero
- Pleopeltis tridens J.Sm.
- Pleopeltis trindadensis (Brade) Salino
- Pleopeltis tweedieana (Hook.) A.R.Sm.
- Pleopeltis villagranii (Copel.) A.R.Sm. & Tejero
- Pleopeltis wiesbaurii (Sodiro) Lellinger
- Pleopeltis xantholepis (Harr.) A.R.Sm.

== Gallery ==
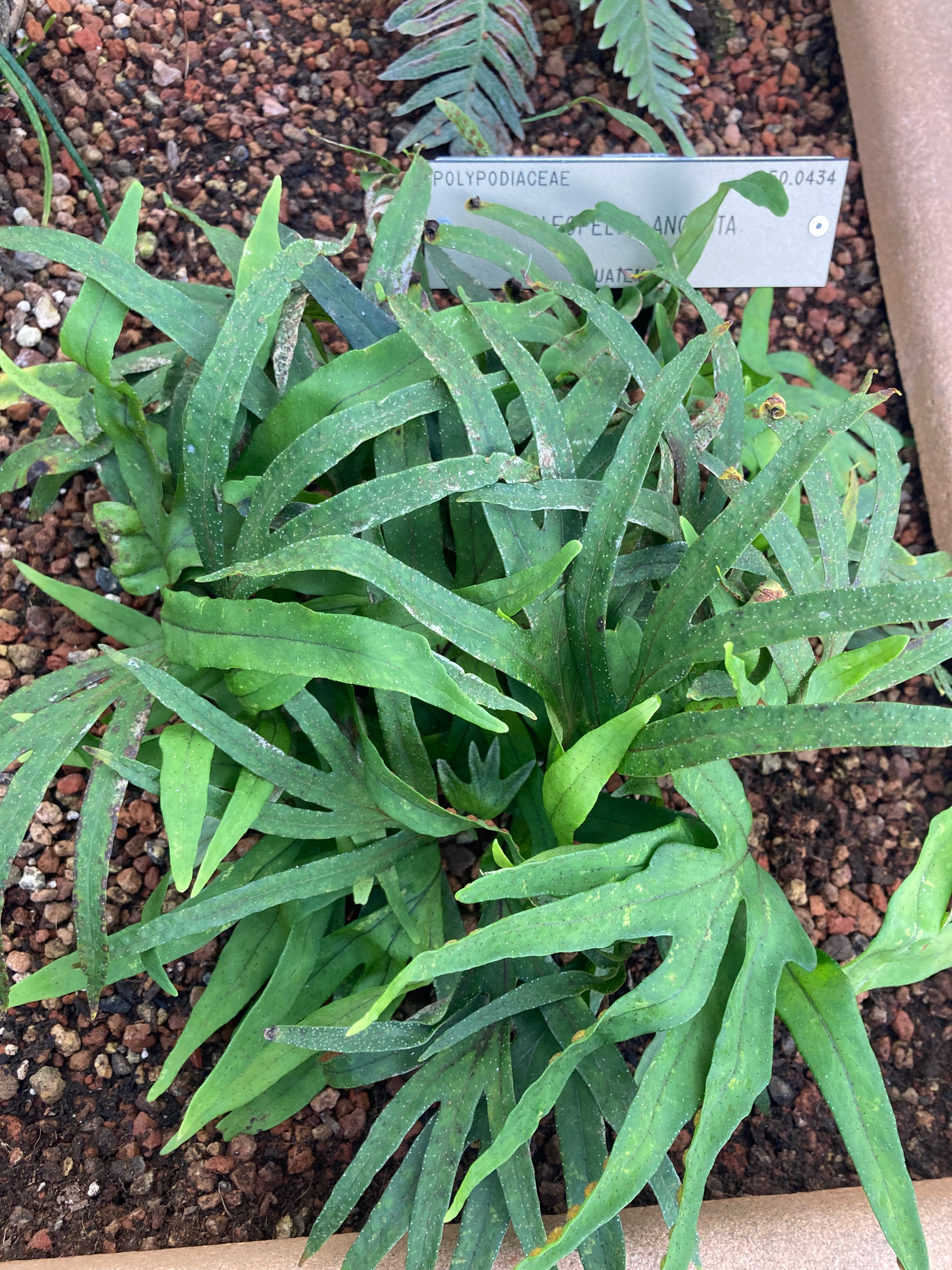
Pleopeltis angusta at the UC Botanical Garden.

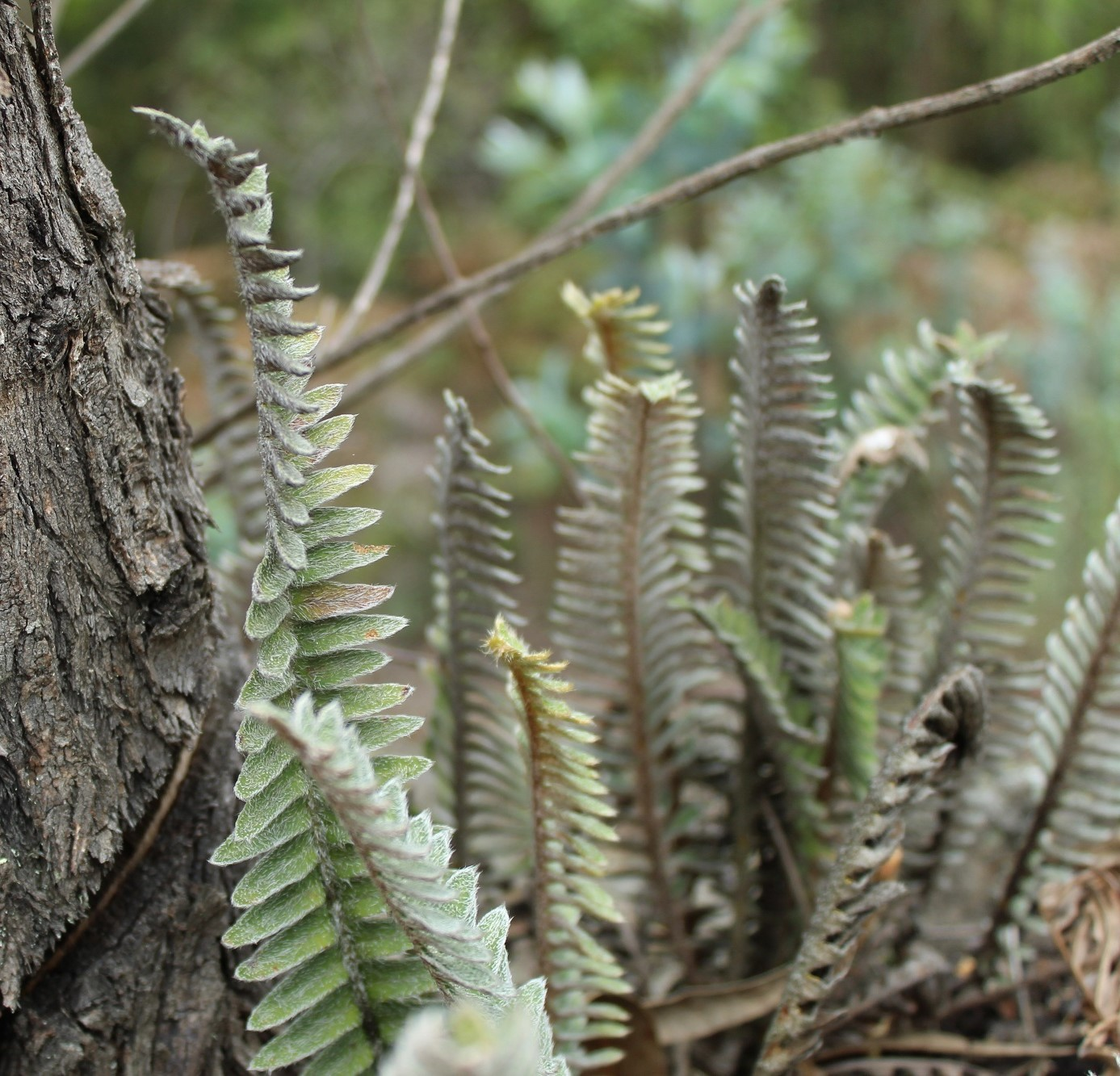
Pleopeltis bombycina.

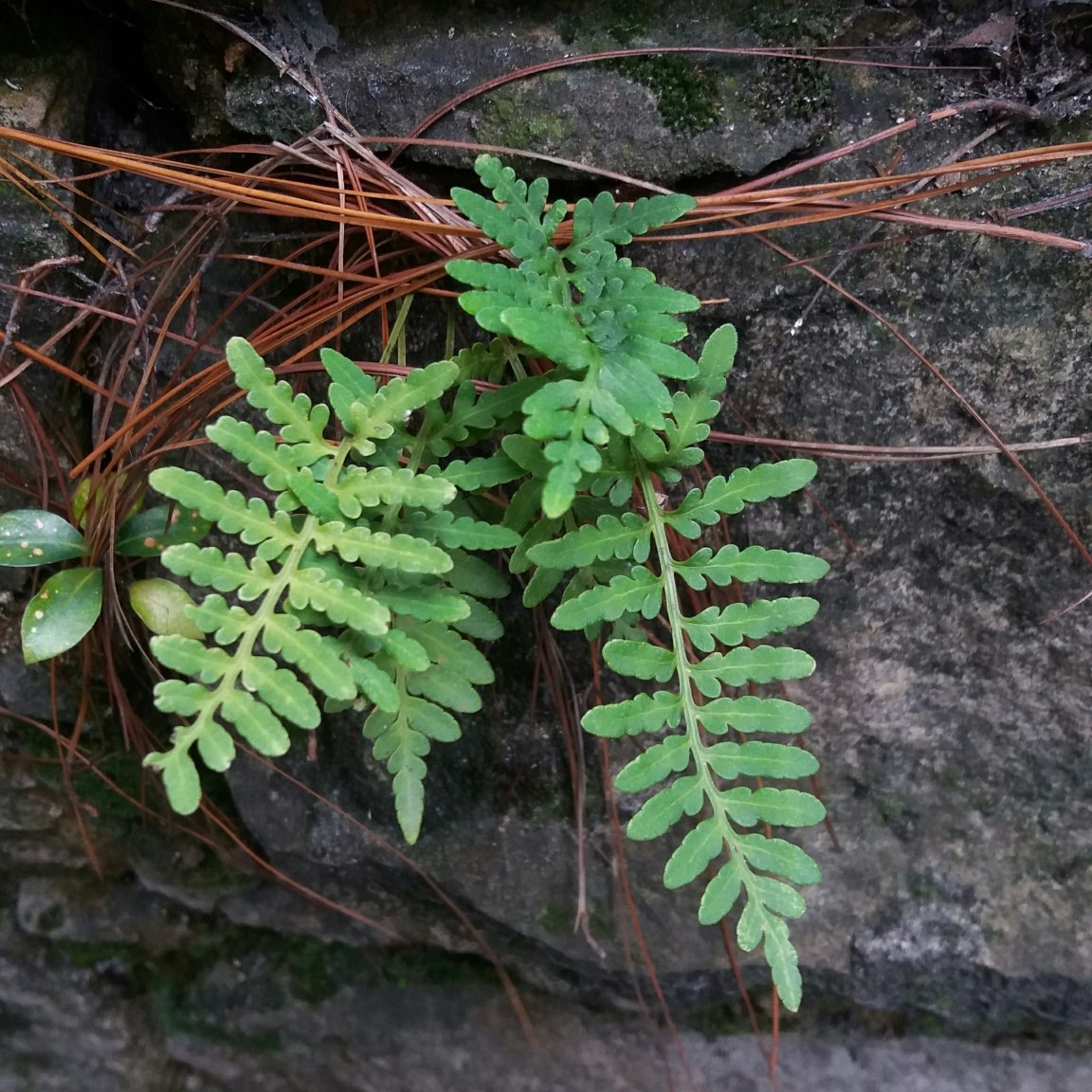
Pleopeltis murorum.

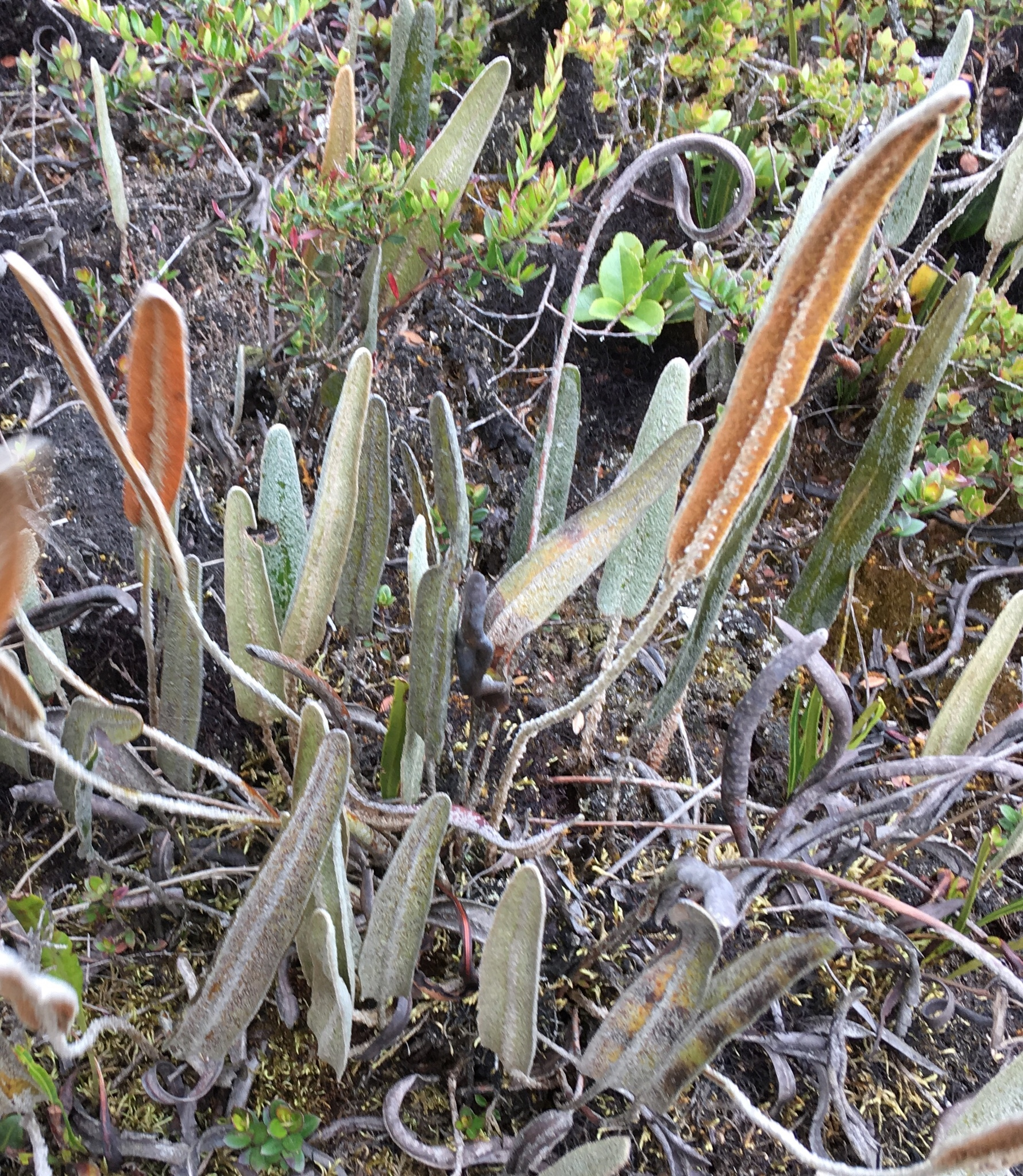
Pleopeltis polylepis.

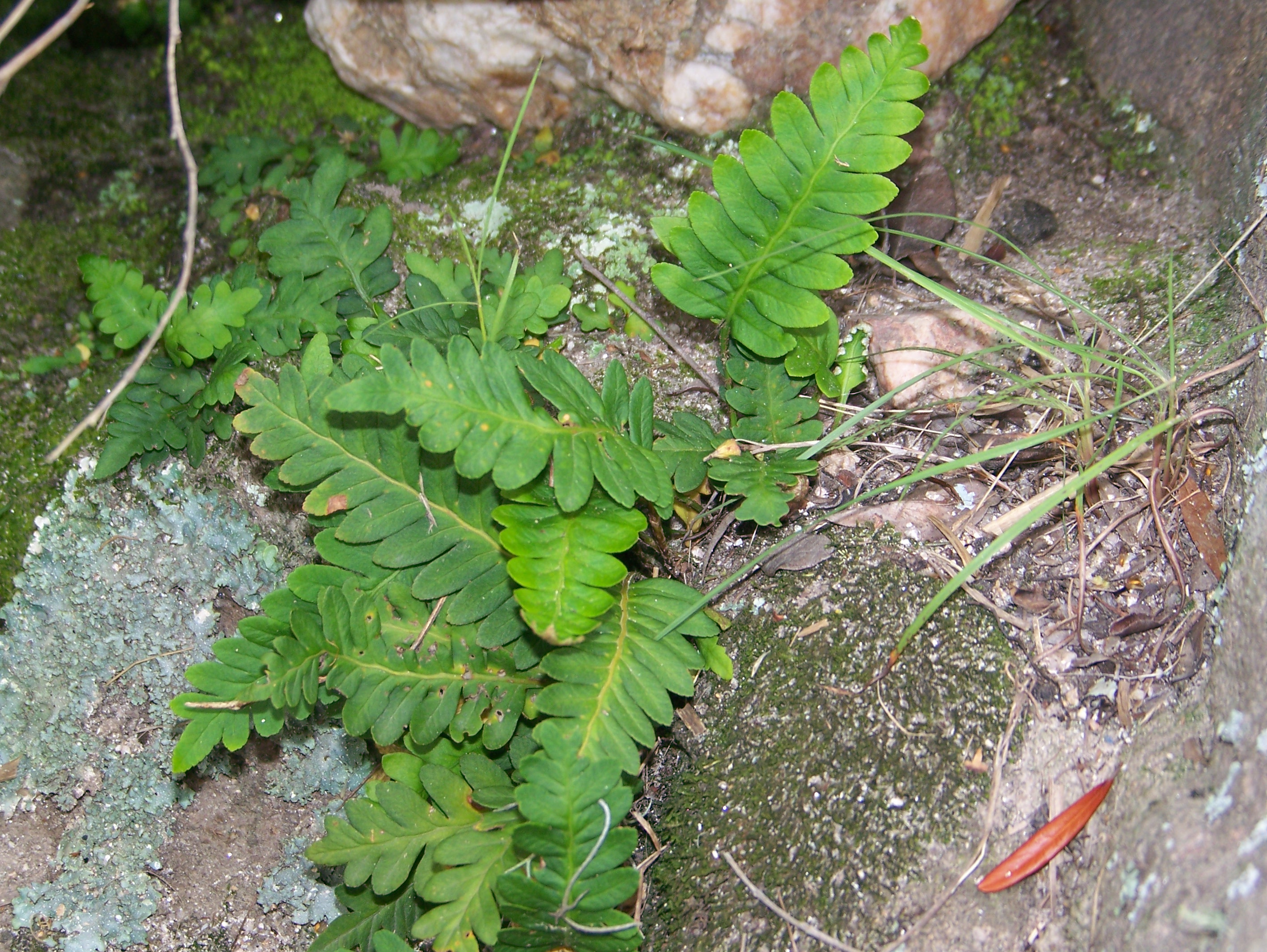
Pleopeltis pinnatifida.
