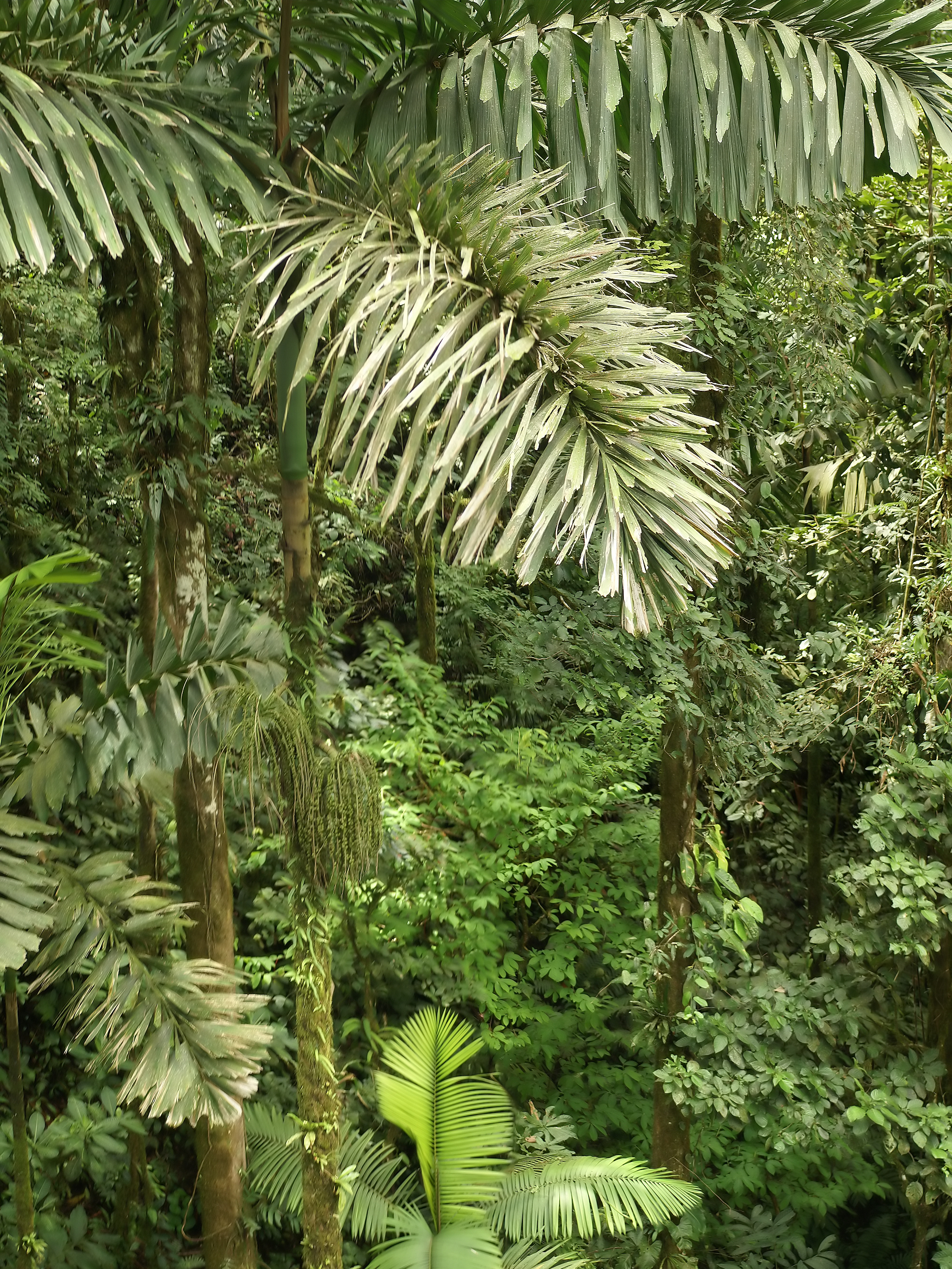

Scientific classification
- Kingdom: Plantae
- Clade: Embryophytes
- Clade: Tracheophytes
- Clade: Spermatophytes
- Clade: Angiosperms
- Clade: Monocots
- Clade: Commelinids
- Order: Arecales
- Family: Arecaceae
- Genus: Socratea
- Species: S. exorrhiza

Binomial name
- Socratea exorrhiza (Mart.) H.Wendl.

= Socratea exorrhiza =

Species of palm

Socratea exorrhiza, the walking palm or cashapona, is a palm native to rainforests in tropical Central and South America. It can grow to 25 metres in height, with a stem diameter of up to 16 cm, but is more typically 15–20 m tall and 12 cm in diameter. It has unusual stilt roots, the function of which has been debated. Many species of epiphyte have been found growing on the palms. The palm is pollinated by beetles, and various organisms eat its seeds or seedlings.

== Function of stilt roots ==
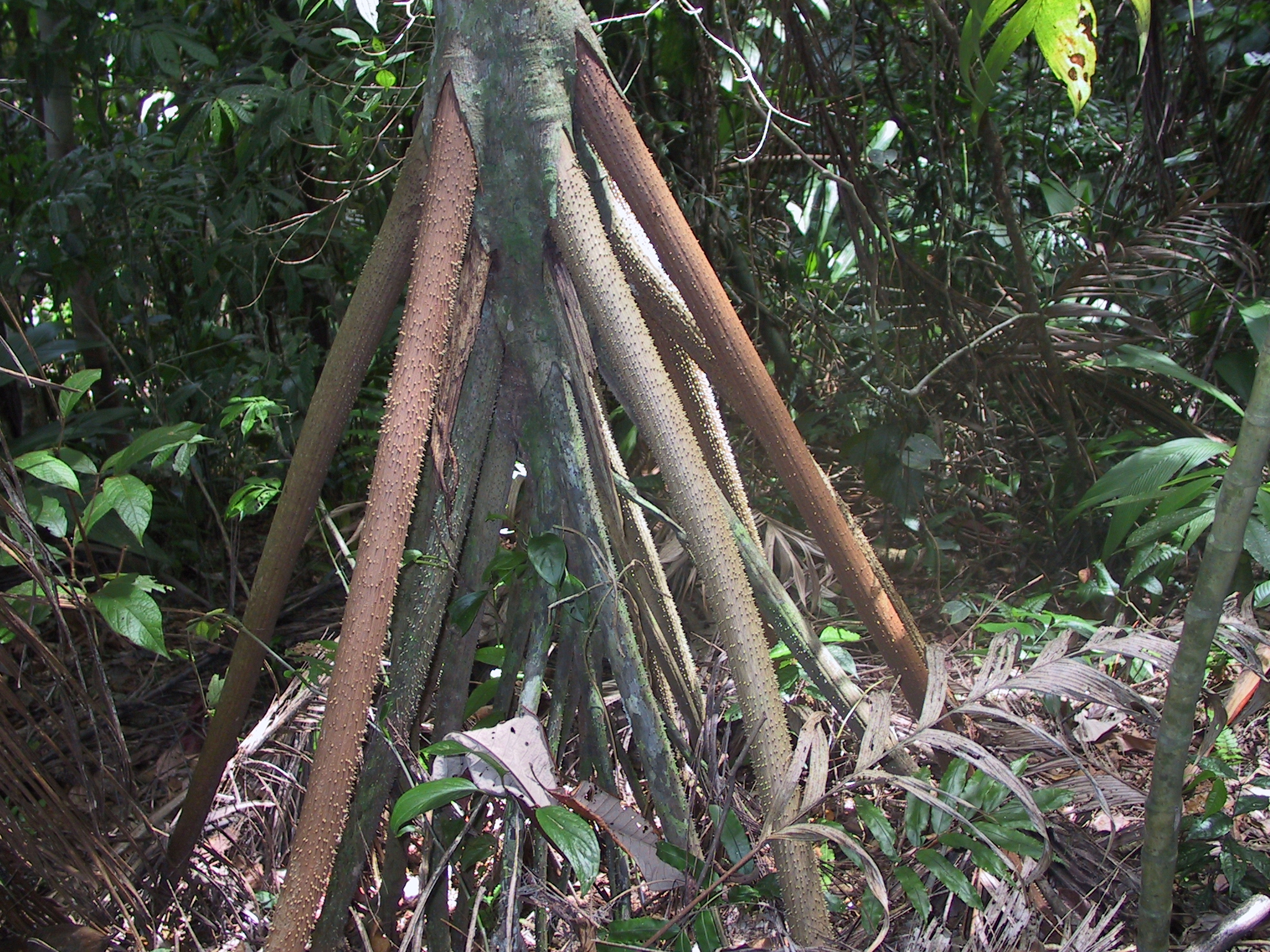
A close up view of the stilt roots

How the stilt roots were proposed to allow it to right itself after other plants collapse on it. 1 - the palm is growing normally. 2 - a tree collapses onto the palm and flattens the stem. 3 - new stilt roots form along the old stem and the original roots (dashed lines) start to die. 4 - the palm continues to grow normally but has now moved away from where it originally germinated

E. J. H. Corner in 1961 hypothesised that the unusual stilt roots of S. exorrhiza were an adaptation to allow the palm to grow in swampy areas of forest. No evidence exists that stilt roots are in fact an adaptation to flooding, and alternative functions for them have been suggested. John H. Bodley suggested in 1980 that they in fact allow the palm to "walk" away from the point of germination if another tree falls on the seedling and knocks it over. If such an event occurs then the palm produces new vertical stilt roots and can then right itself, the original roots rotting away. Radford writes in the Skeptical Inquirer in December 2009 that "As interesting as it would be to think that when no one is around, trees walk the rainforest floor, it is a mere myth", and cites two detailed studies that came to this conclusion. Other advantages of stilt roots over normal roots have since been proposed. Swaine proposed in 1983 that they allow the palm to colonise areas where there is much debris (for example, dead logs) as they can avoid it by moving their roots. Hartshorn suggested in 1983 that stilt roots allow the palm to grow upwards to reach light without having to increase the diameter of the stem. It was also thought that the roots may confer an advantage when the palm is growing on a slope, but no evidence has been found that this is the case. These very thick (8–10 cm) roots grow as much as 70 cm longer in a month.

Iriartea has similar stilt roots to S. exorrhiza.

== Epiphytes ==
Many different species of epiphyte have been found to grow on S. exorrhiza. A study of 118 individual trees in Panama found 66 species from 15 families on them. Bryophytes covered up to 30% of the stems, and the relative coverage increased as the stem diameter increased. Around half of the trees studied had vascular epiphytes growing on them. Up to 85 individuals from 12 different species were found on one palm, and another tree was colonised by a total of 16 different species. The most common epiphytes were three species of fern, Ananthacorus angustifolius, Elaphoglossum sporadolepis and Dicranoglossum panamense, altogether accounting for 30% of all the individuals recorded. Other common species, representing more than 5% of the individuals found, included Scaphyglottis longicaulis (Orchidaceae), Philodendron schottianum (Araceae) and Guzmania subcorymbosa (Bromeliaceae). Almost half of the species recorded were rare, however, with only between 1 and 3 individuals being recorded on all of the palms. A clear vertical distribution was found between different species: some grew in the understory, other in the midstory and others in the canopy. Trees with epiphytes were found to be significantly larger than those without. This suggests that the palms must reach a certain age before they are colonised; for example, it is estimated that palms must be 20 years old before they are colonised by vascular epiphytes.

== Leaf morphology ==
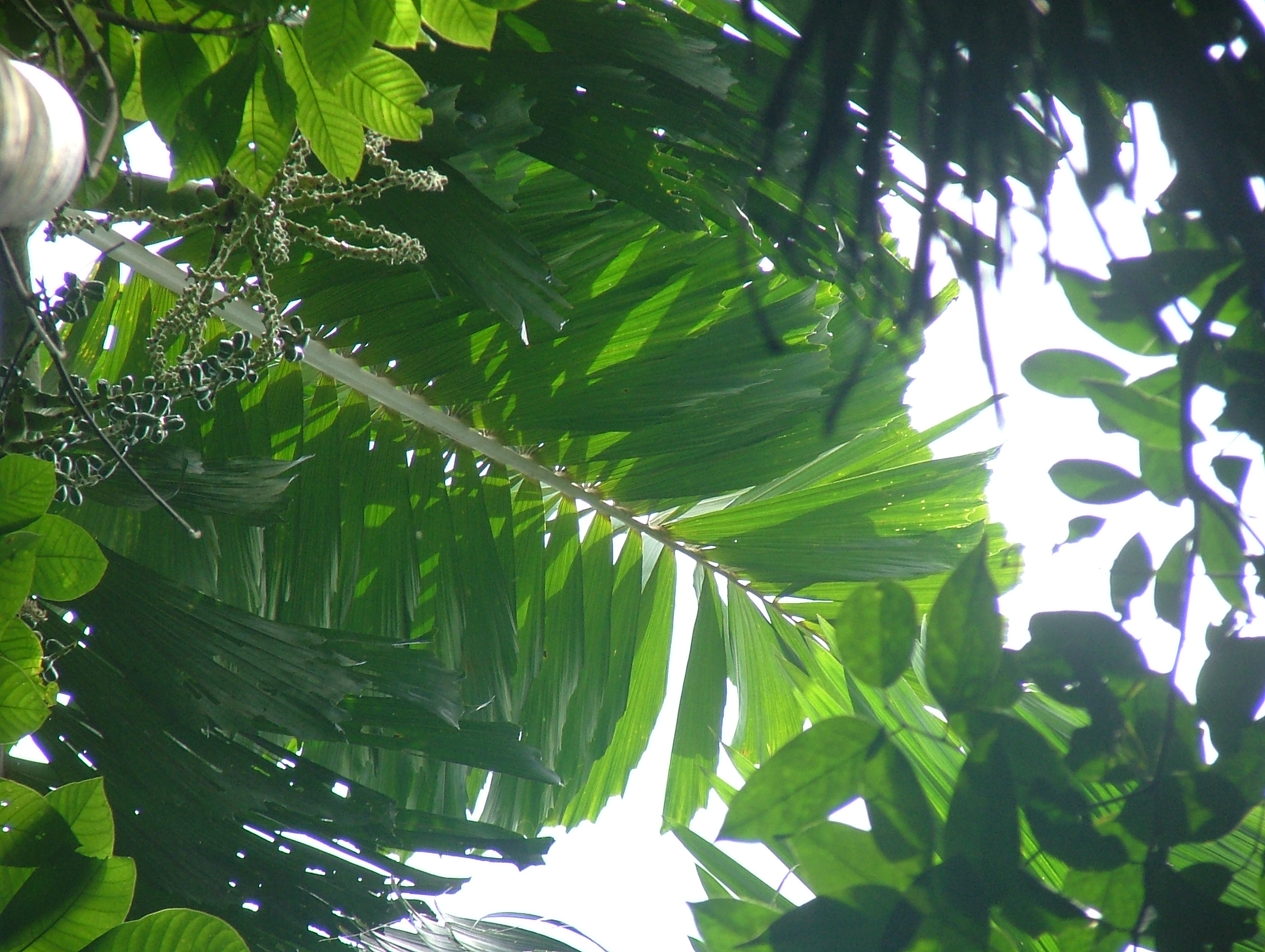
A leaf of S. exorrhiza

Leaves of S. exorrhiza that grow in the sun are thicker, have more trichomes and more stomata than those that grow in the shade. Among the younger trees the leaflets are all arranged along a single plane, as with Howea, but in older individuals the leaflets are scattered among many planes as in the queen palm.

== Predators ==
White-lipped peccaries consume a large proportion of the seeds of S. exorrhiza and play an important role in limiting their population.

== Reproduction ==
Socratea exorrhiza flowers mostly during the dry season and is considered to be beetle pollinated, being frequently visited by species of Phyllotrox (Derelomini) and Mystrops (Nitidulidae). Seeds weigh around 3.5 g and are around 2 cm long and 1.5 cm wide, only around 45% of them germinate and around one quarter of these die.

== Uses ==
The trunk is used in the construction of houses and other structures, as well as hunting spears. It is usually split lengthwise before it is used, but it can also be hollowed out and used as a tube. The inner parts of the stilt roots are used as a male aphrodisiac. The yellow fruit is edible. The leaves may be used to build a temporary shelter or more permanent hut roofs. A harpoon foreshaft identified as wood of the palm was found with a large flaked lithic projectile point in an underwater preceramic site the middle Xingu.
