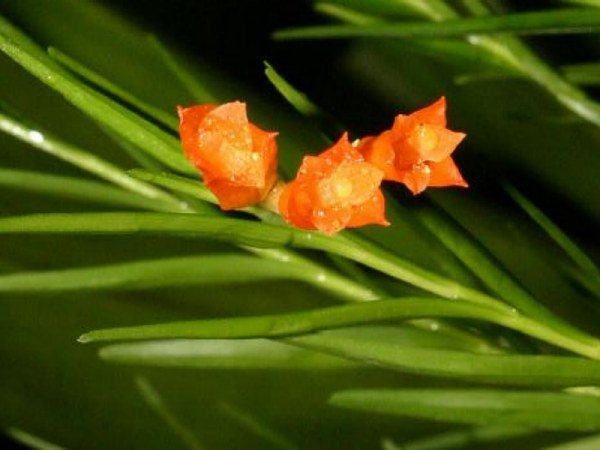

Scientific classification
- Kingdom: Plantae
- Clade: Tracheophytes
- Clade: Angiosperms
- Clade: Monocots
- Order: Asparagales
- Family: Orchidaceae
- Subfamily: Epidendroideae
- Genus: Isochilus
- Species: I. aurantiacus

Binomial name
- Isochilus aurantiacus Hamer & Garay

= Isochilus aurantiacus =

Species of orchid

Isochilus aurantiacus is a species of flowering plant in the family Orchidaceae. It is native to Mexico (Chiapas), south into Central America.
