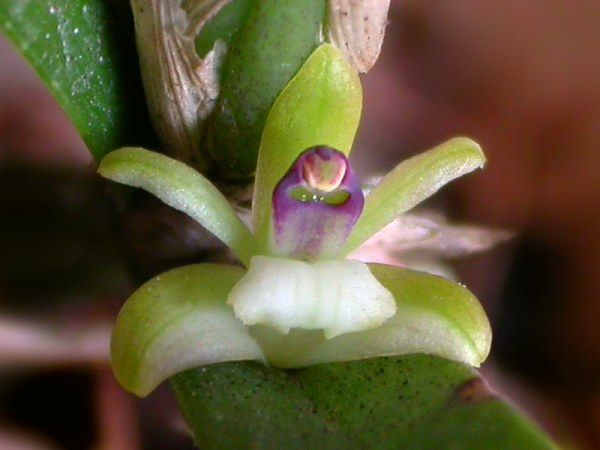
- Flower of Scaphyglottis boliviensis

Scientific classification
- Kingdom: Plantae
- Clade: Tracheophytes
- Clade: Angiosperms
- Clade: Monocots
- Order: Asparagales
- Family: Orchidaceae
- Subfamily: Epidendroideae
- Genus: Scaphyglottis
- Species: S. boliviensis

Binomial name
- Scaphyglottis boliviensis (Rolfe) B.R.Adams

Synonyms
- Hexadesmia boliviensis Rolfe (basionym); Scaphyglottis stricta Schltr.; Scaphyglottis exilis Schltr.; Scaphyglottis amazonica Schltr.; Scaphyglottis huebneri Schltr.; Ornithidium flaccidum Kraenzl.; Scaphyglottis matogrossensis Brade; Scaphyglottis decipiens C.Schweinf.; Scaphyglottis flaccida (Kraenzl.) Garay; Scaphyglottis suarezii Dodson

= Scaphyglottis boliviensis =

Species of orchid

Scaphyglottis boliviensis is a species of orchid found from Central America to tropical South America. It is a pseudobulbous epiphyte and primarily grows in a wet tropical biome. The orchid was first published during 1988 in Phytologia 64: 257. Since, Scaphyglottis boliviensis has been accepted by leading botanical authorities.
