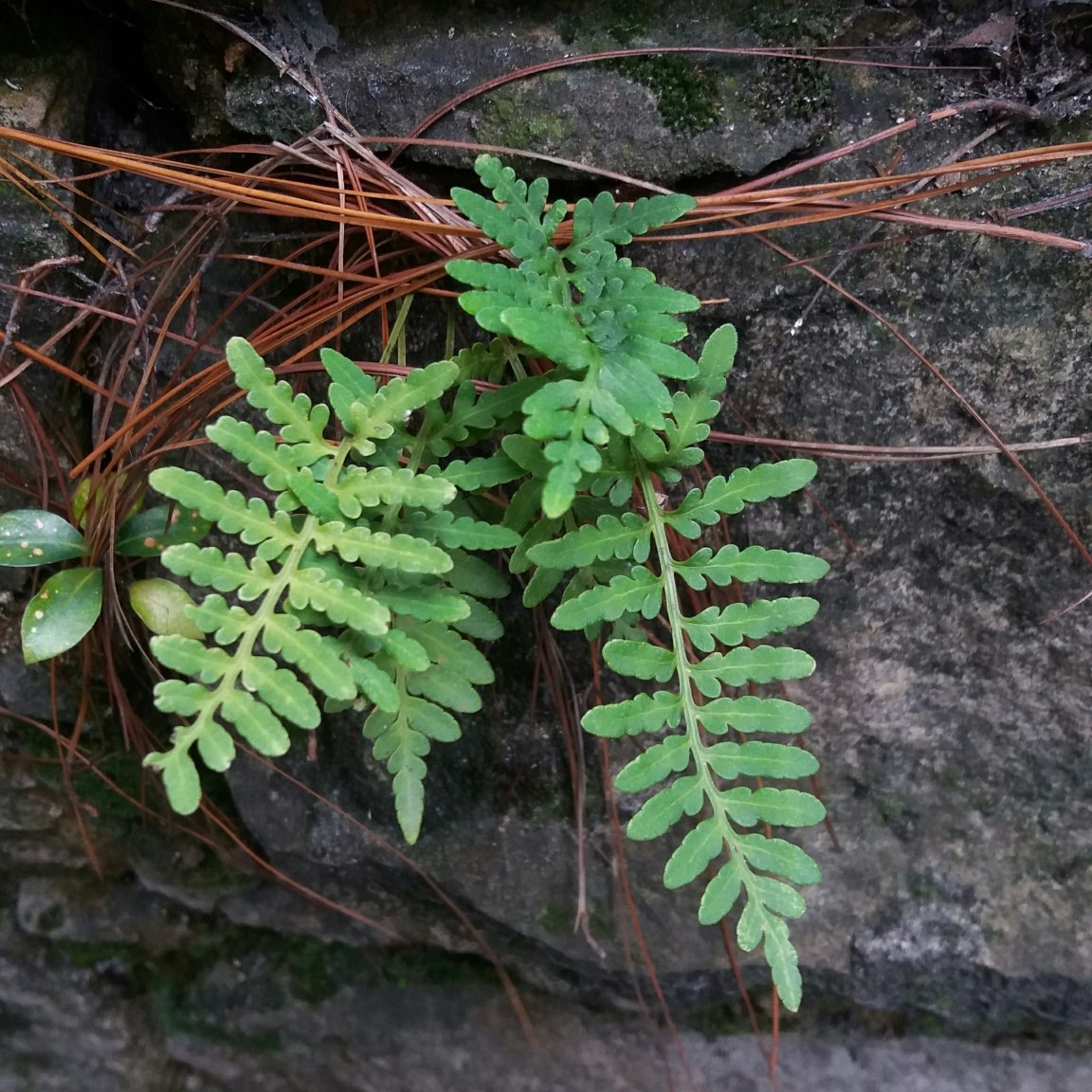

Scientific classification
- Kingdom: Plantae
- Clade: Tracheophytes
- Division: Polypodiophyta
- Class: Polypodiopsida
- Order: Polypodiales
- Suborder: Polypodiineae
- Family: Polypodiaceae
- Genus: Pleopeltis
- Species: P. murorum

Binomial name
- Pleopeltis murorum (Hook.) A.R.Sm. & Tejero

Synonyms
- Polypodium murorum Hook.; Lepicystis murorum (Hook.) Diels; Polypodium mixtum Sodiro

= Pleopeltis murorum =

Species of fern

Pleopeltis murorum is a species of fern in the family Polypodiaceae. It is native to parts of Central and Southern America (Costa Rica, Hispaniola, Colombia, Venezuela and Ecuador). Under the synonym Polypodium mixtum, it was regarded as endemic to Ecuador and threatened by habitat loss.
