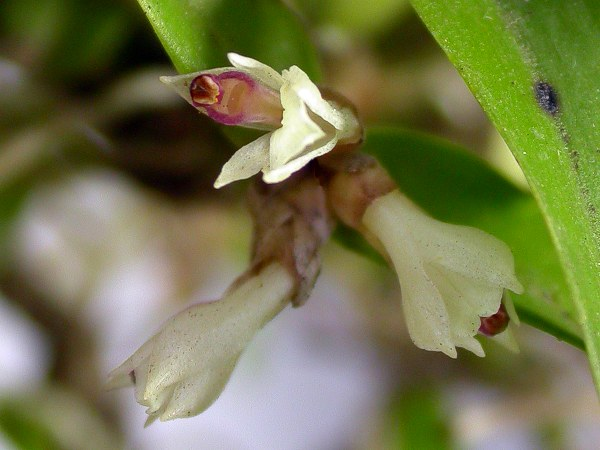
- Flower of Scaphyglottis sickii

Scientific classification
- Kingdom: Plantae
- Clade: Tracheophytes
- Clade: Angiosperms
- Clade: Monocots
- Order: Asparagales
- Family: Orchidaceae
- Subfamily: Epidendroideae
- Genus: Scaphyglottis
- Species: S. sickii

Binomial name
- Scaphyglottis sickii Pabst

Synonyms
- Scaphyglottis signata I.Bock

= Scaphyglottis sickii =

Species of orchid

Scaphyglottis sickii is a species of orchid occurring from Grenada to tropical South America.
