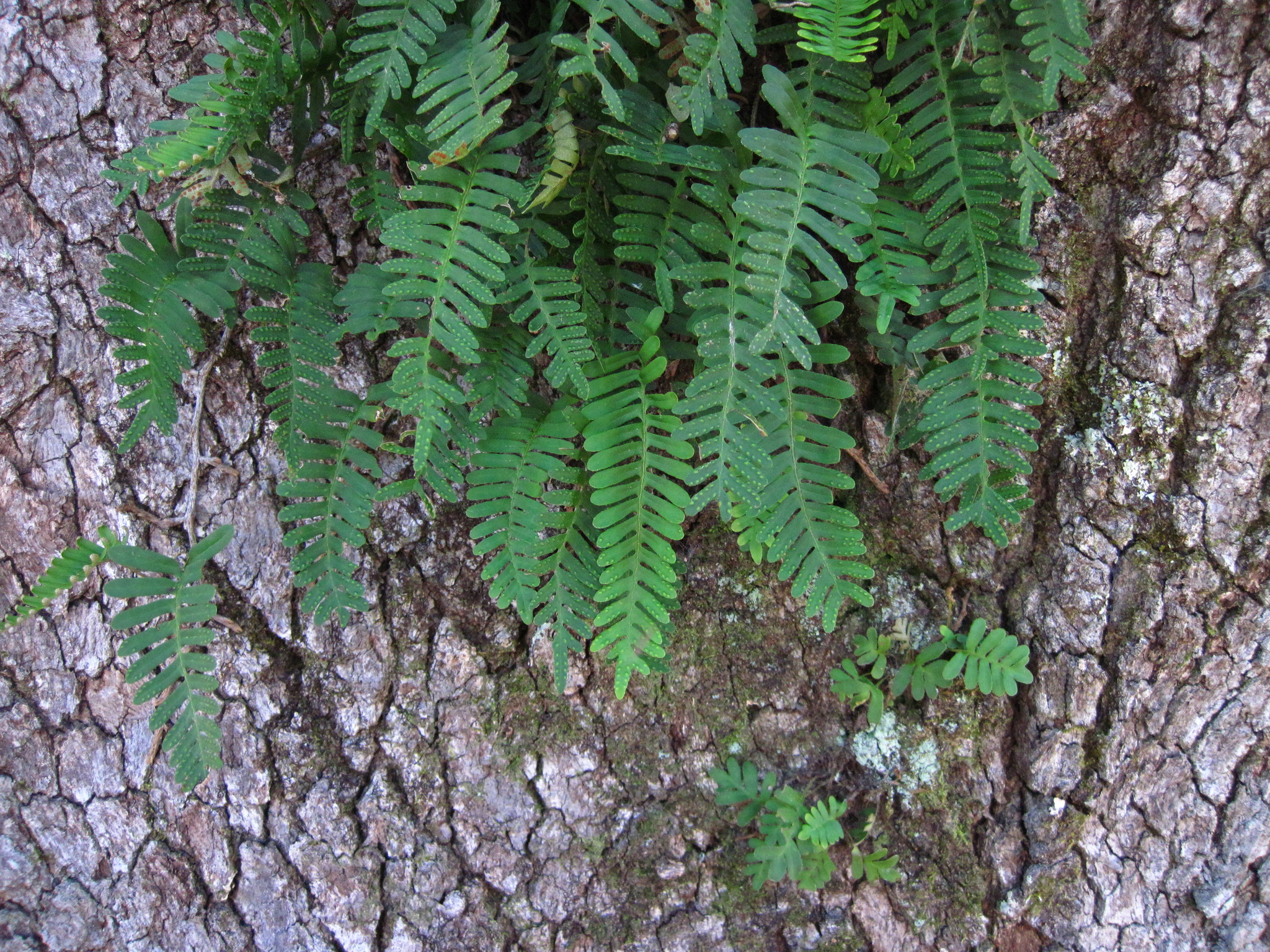

Scientific classification
- Kingdom: Plantae
- Clade: Tracheophytes
- Division: Polypodiophyta
- Class: Polypodiopsida
- Order: Polypodiales
- Suborder: Polypodiineae
- Family: Polypodiaceae
- Genus: Pleopeltis
- Species: P. michauxiana

Binomial name
- Pleopeltis michauxiana (Weath.) Hickey & Sprunt

Synonyms
- Pleopeltis polypodioides var. michauxiana (Weath.) E.B.Andrews & Windham; Polypodium polypodioides var. michauxianum Weath.

= Pleopeltis michauxiana =

Species of fern

Pleopeltis michauxiana, known as the resurrection fern, scaly polypody, and Gray's polypody, is a species of epiphytic fern native to North America and Central America.

Pleopeltis michauxiana is found in the lower Midwest and Southeastern United States, Mexico, and Guatemala. It is the most widespread epiphytic fern in North America. In addition to growing on trees, P. michauxiana less typically grows on substrates such as rock (usually limestone or sandstone) and mossy banks, as well as man-made objects such as fences and buildings.
