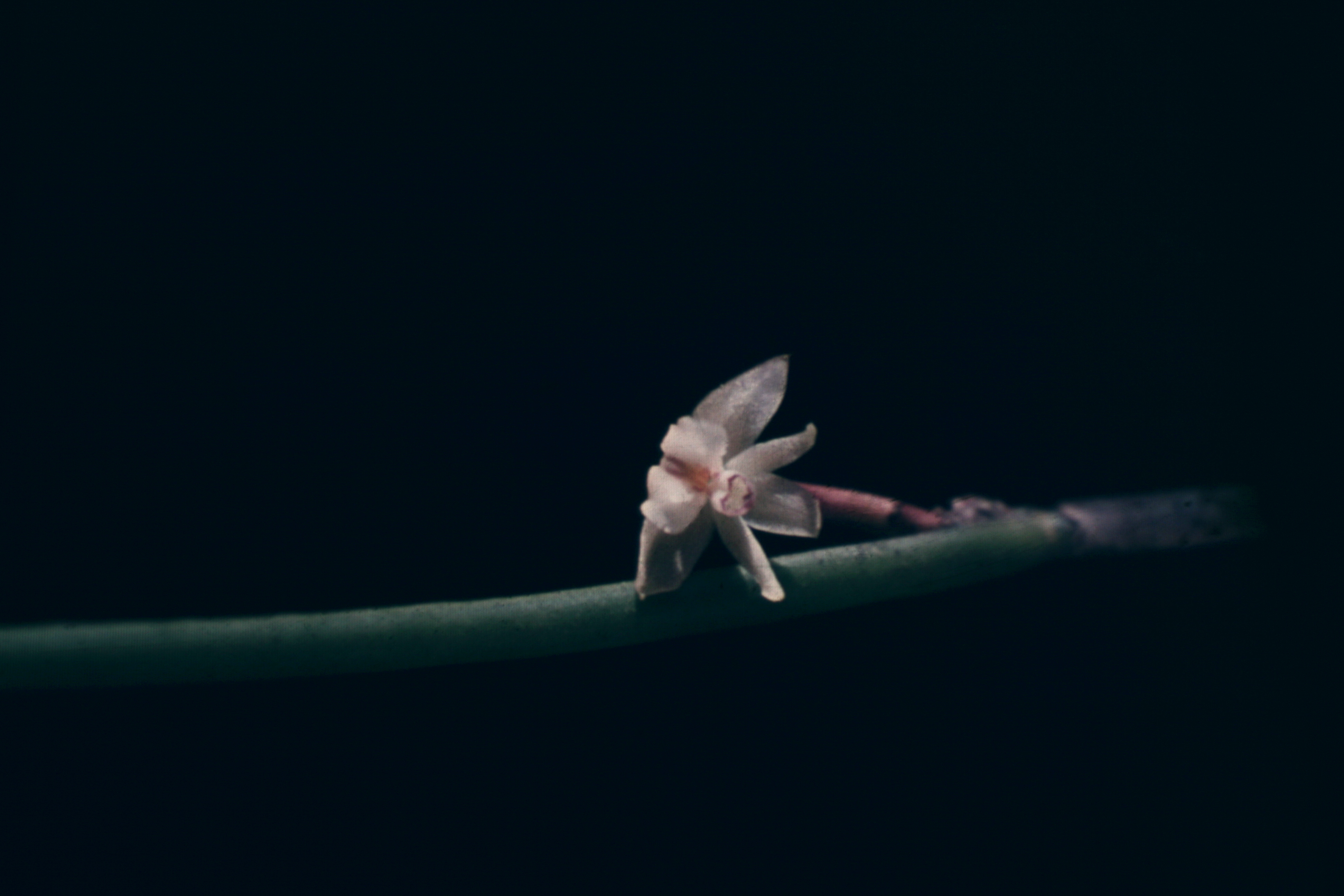
- Flower of Scaphyglottis reflexa

Scientific classification
- Kingdom: Plantae
- Clade: Tracheophytes
- Clade: Angiosperms
- Clade: Monocots
- Order: Asparagales
- Family: Orchidaceae
- Subfamily: Epidendroideae
- Genus: Scaphyglottis
- Species: S. reflexa

Binomial name
- Scaphyglottis reflexa Lindl.

Synonyms
- Hexisea reflexa (Lindl.) Rchb.f. ex Griseb.; Reichenbachanthus modestus Barb.Rodr.; Fractiunguis brasiliensis Schltr.; Reichenbachanthus reflexus (Lindl.) Porto & Brade; Scaphyglottis brasiliensis (Schltr.) Dressler

= Scaphyglottis reflexa =

Species of orchid

Scaphyglottis reflexa is a species of orchid occurring from Grenada to Central America and tropical South America.
