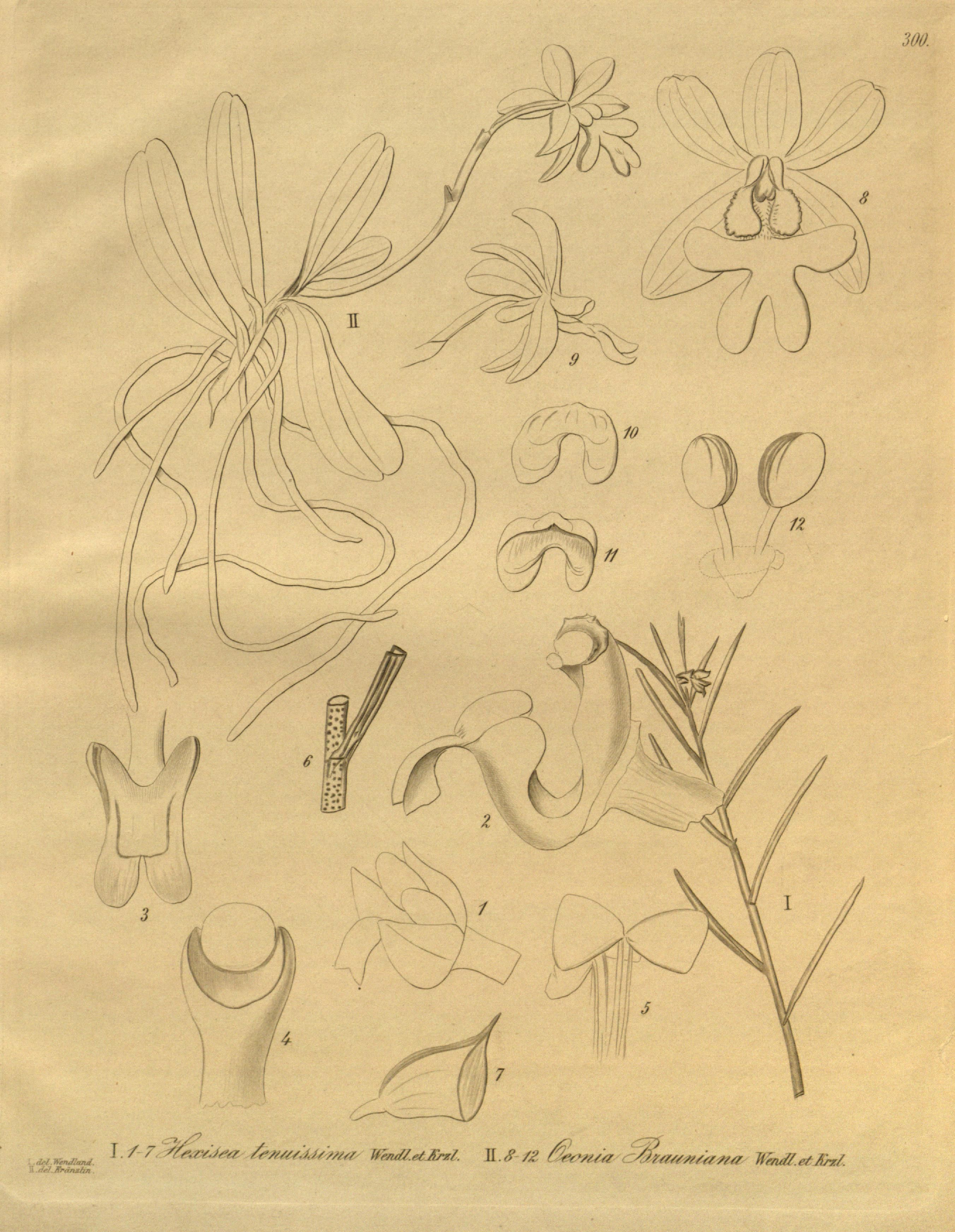
- Ponera juncifolia (as Hexisea tenuissima) - Oeonia brauniana - Xenia 3 pl 300.

Scientific classification
- Kingdom: Plantae
- Clade: Tracheophytes
- Clade: Angiosperms
- Clade: Monocots
- Order: Asparagales
- Family: Orchidaceae
- Subfamily: Epidendroideae
- Tribe: Epidendreae
- Subtribe: Ponerinae
- Genus: Ponera; Lindl.

Type species
- Ponera juncifolia Lindl.

Synonyms
- Pseudoponera Brieger in F.R.R.Schlechter, not validly published

= Ponera (plant) =

Genus of orchids

Ponera is a genus of orchids. It contains two currently accepted species, native to Mexico, Guatemala and El Salvador.

Species accepted as of June 2014:

- Ponera exilis Dressler - Colima, Jalisco, Guerrero, Mexico State
- Ponera juncifolia Lindl. - widespread from Hidalgo to El Salvador
