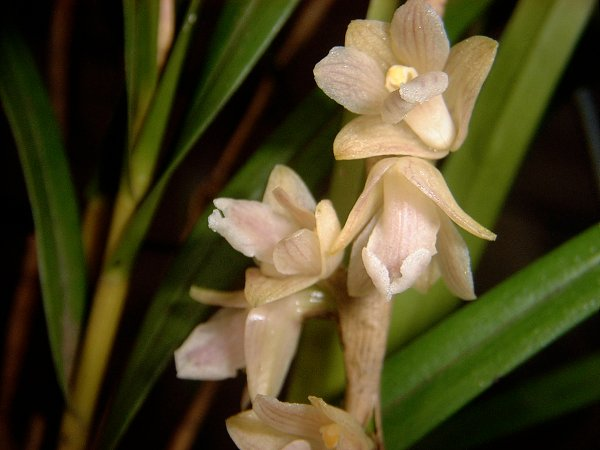
- Nemaconia striata

Scientific classification
- Kingdom: Plantae
- Clade: Tracheophytes
- Clade: Angiosperms
- Clade: Monocots
- Order: Asparagales
- Family: Orchidaceae
- Subfamily: Epidendroideae
- Tribe: Epidendreae
- Subtribe: Ponerinae
- Genus: Nemaconia; Knowles & Westc.

= Nemaconia =

Genus of plants

Nemaconia is a genus of flowering plants belonging to the family Orchidaceae.

Its native range is Mexico to Southern Tropical America.

Species:

- Nemaconia dressleriana (Soto Arenas) Van den Berg, Salazar & Soto Arenas
- Nemaconia glomerata (Correll) Van den Berg, Salazar & Soto Arenas
- Nemaconia graminifolia Knowles & Westc.
- Nemaconia longipetala (Correll) Van den Berg, Salazar & Soto Arenas
- Nemaconia pellita (Rchb.f.) Van den Berg, Salazar & Soto Arenas
- Nemaconia striata (Lindl.) Van den Berg, Salazar & Soto Arenas
