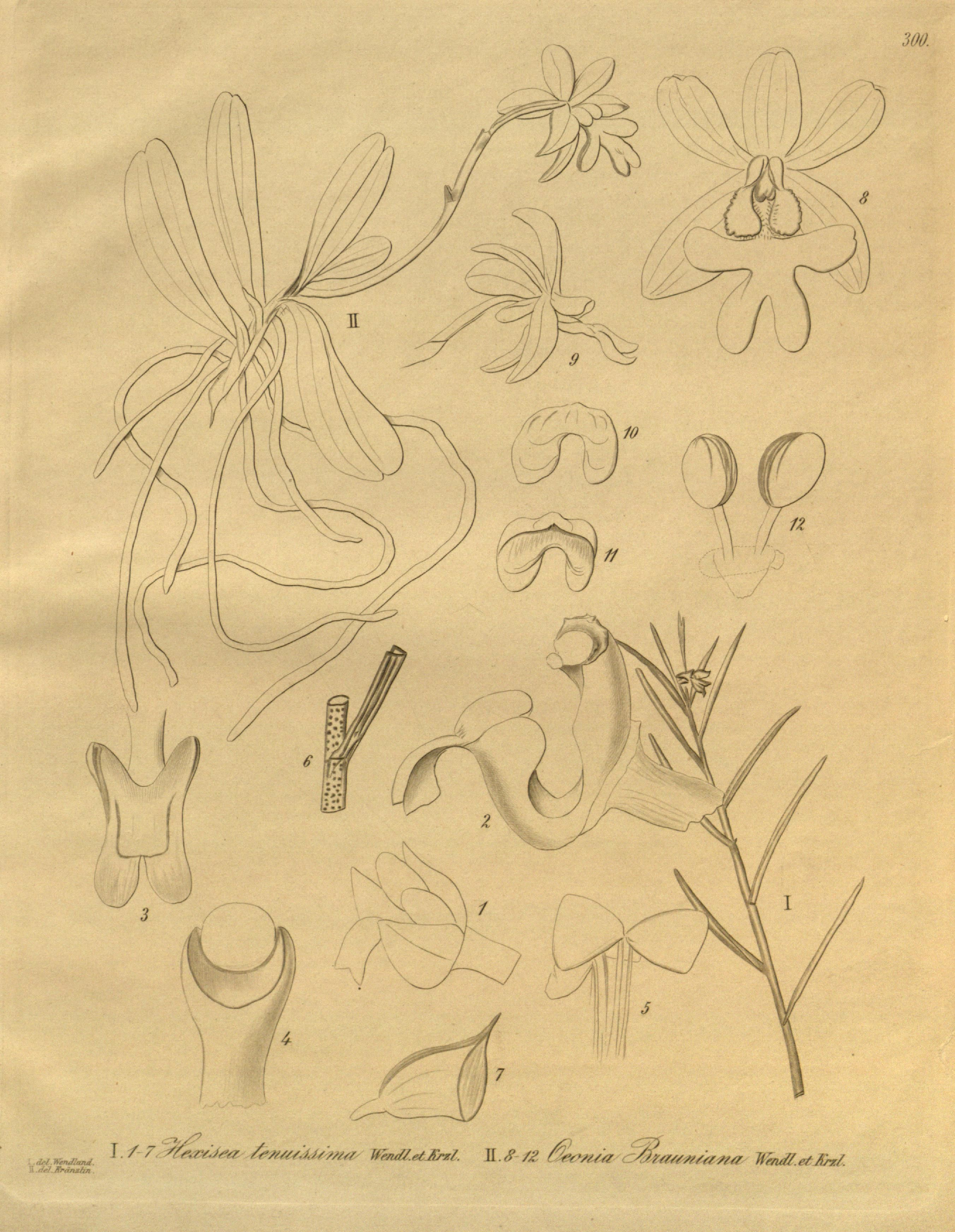
- Ponera juncifolia

Scientific classification
- Kingdom: Plantae
- Clade: Tracheophytes
- Clade: Angiosperms
- Clade: Monocots
- Order: Asparagales
- Family: Orchidaceae
- Subfamily: Epidendroideae
- Tribe: Epidendreae
- Subtribe: Ponerinae; Pfitzer

Genera
- Helleriella; Isochilus; Nemaconia; Ponera

= Ponerinae (plant) =

Subtribe of orchids

Ponerinae is a subtribe of the Orchidaceae tribe Epidendreae. The Ponerinae are characterized by sympodial stems that do not form pseudobulbs, bear two or more leaves, and a racemose or paniculate inflorescence carrying flowers with four or six pollinia.

It comprises four genera:

- Helleriella
- Isochilus
- Nemaconia
- Ponera, the type genus
