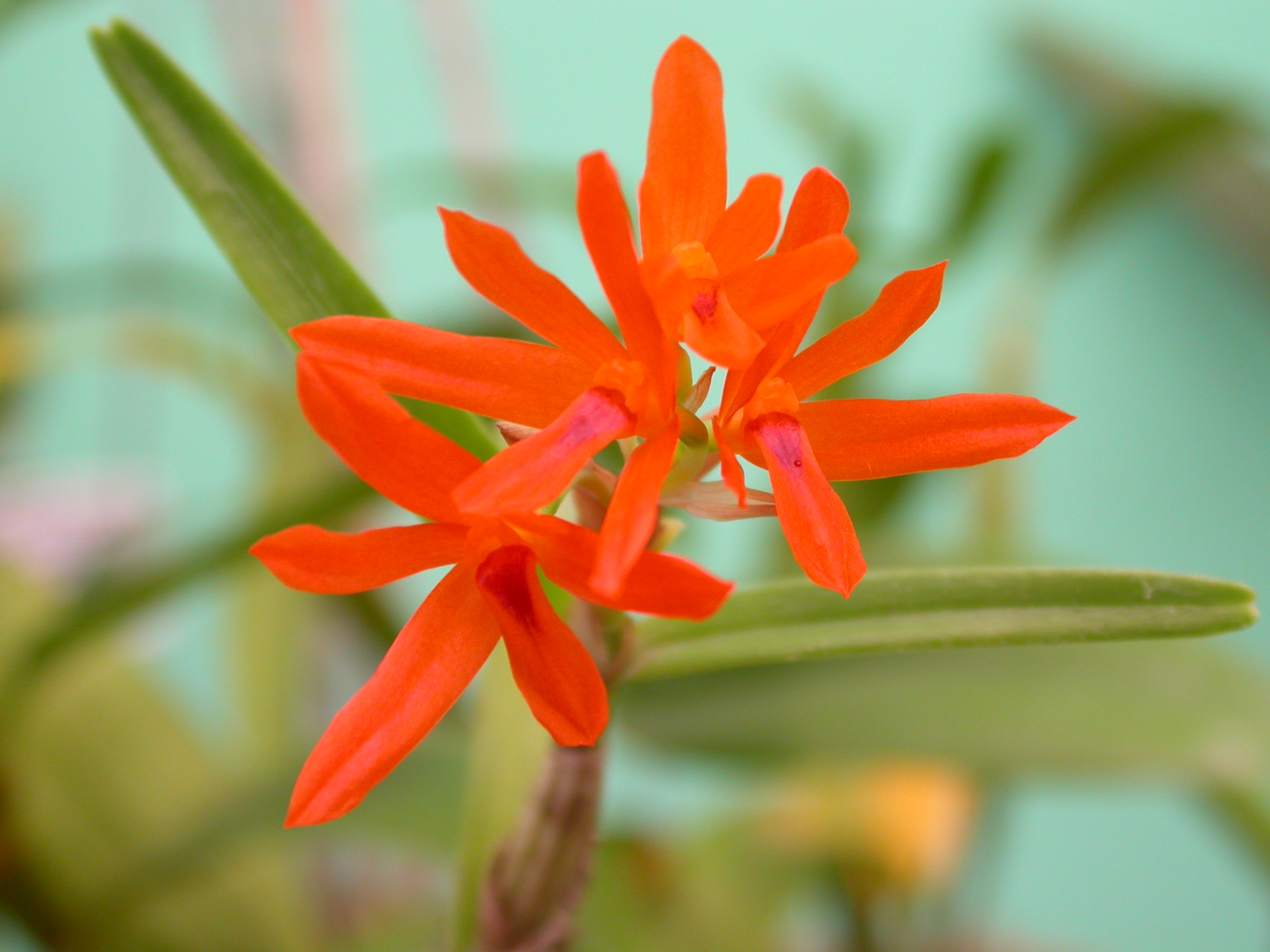
- Scaphyglottis bidentata

Scientific classification
- Kingdom: Plantae
- Clade: Tracheophytes
- Clade: Angiosperms
- Clade: Monocots
- Order: Asparagales
- Family: Orchidaceae
- Subfamily: Epidendroideae
- Tribe: Epidendreae
- Subtribe: Laeliinae
- Genus: Scaphyglottis; Poepp. & Endl.
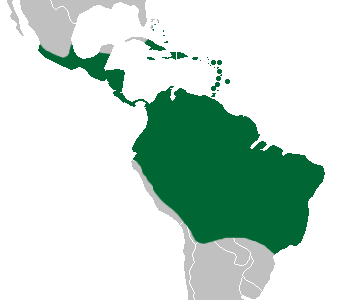
- Scaphyglottis distribution

Synonyms
- Hexisea Lindl.; Hexadesmia Brongn.; Hexopia Bateman ex Lindl.; Euothonaea Rchb.f.; Tetragamestus Rchb.f.; Reichenbachanthus Barb.Rodr.; Fractiunguis Schltr.; Leaoa Schltr. & Porto; Costaricaea Schltr.; Pachystele Schltr. illegitimate name; Ramonia Schltr.; Platyglottis L.O.Williams; Pseudohexadesmia Brieger in F.R.R.Schlechter, invalid name; Sessilibulbum Brieger in F.R.R.Schlechter, invalid name; Pachystelis Rauschert

= Scaphyglottis =

Genus of orchids

Scaphyglottis (abbreviated Scgl.) is a genus of orchids native to Mexico, Central America, northern South America and parts of the Caribbean. The current concept of this genus is the result of combining several genera which have been described at various times. The concept is characterized by the growth habit: not only are new pseudobulbs added at the base of the old ones (as is typical of sympodial orchids), but new pseudobulbs also grow at the apices of the old ones. Many species are quite similar and difficult to distinguish, but some are clearly distinct. A few have showy colors. The genus comprises nearly 70 species.

== Description ==
The plants are epiphytic, or sometimes lithophytic. They show considerable variation in size, ranging from a few cm to nearly 1 m tall. They all have narrow, elongated pseudobulbs covered at the base by numerous evanescent sheaths. Each pseudobulb bears up to three long, narrow apical leaves. The pseudobulbs are superposed i. e. tend to grow in stacked chains, one arising from the apex of another.

The inflorescence grows from the apex of the pseudobulb, and differs from most sympodial orchids in that one pseudobulb will sometimes produce inflorescences for several years. This, combined with the habit of new pseudobulbs growing from the apices of old ones, creates the impression that there are inflorescences growing from the middle of the stem. The inflorescence can be solitary, successive, racemose or paniculate.

The flowers are small, and nearly always white, cream, or a pale shade of green or lavender, with the exception of two species of Hexisea, which are mostly brilliant red. The petals and sepals have nearly the same length, but the petals are usually wider, and the lip is usually the largest perianth segment. The anther is terminal, and contains four to six pollinia.

Most Scaphyglottis are pollinated by insects; nearly all species produce nectar which accumulates in the nectary formed by the base of the lip and the bottom of the column. The two species of Hexisea are possibly also pollinated by hummingbirds, which are especially known to visit red flowers.

== Taxonomic history ==
The genus was published by Eduard Friedrich Poeppig and Stephan Ladislaus Endlicher in 1835. In 1960, Robert Louis Dressler designated Fernandezia graminifolia Ruiz & Pavon, now known as Scaphyglottis graminifolia, to be the type species. The generic epithet comes from the Greek skaphe, concave or hollow, and glotta, tongue, in reference to the shape of the floral labellum.

This definition of Scaphyglottis was unclear for a long time. There is a large group of species clearly belonging to the genus, such as the now defunct three small genera Tetragamestus, Leaoa, and Hexadesmia, which were brought into synonymy decades ago. In 1993, a review of Scaphpyglottis was published which did not include a complete synonymy, but which was nevertheless useful in clarifying many of the species in the genus.

Many of the species belonging to Scaphyglottis before the unification are also confusing and variable, forming various complexes of reproductively isolated groups that seem morphologically identical.

=== Synonymy ===
In 2004, several other genera were brought into synonymy with Scaphyglottis as the concept is used today:

Hexadesmia This genus containing 27 species was described by Adolphe-Théodore Brongniart in 1843. It consisted of several different species separated from Scaphyglottis because the flowers had six pollinia instead of four. Because all of these species are in the basal clade of Scaphyglottis, six pollinia seems likely to be the ancestral condition of Scaphyglottis. Several other authors, including Schlechter and Reichenbach, placed additional species in Hexadesmia.

Leaoa: In 1922, Rudolf Schlechter and Paulo de Campos Porto erected this small genus for a species that had previously been called Hexadesmia monophylla, which had a very long inflorescence, rather than the short inflorescence typical of Hexadesmia, as well as the typical six pollinia. More species were added to the genus by Leslie Andrew Garay in 1955 and by Friedrich Gustav Brieger in 1976, bringing the total to four.

Tetragamestus: Heinrich gustav Reichenbach described Tetragamestus modestus in 1854. Three additional species have been assigned to this genus, the last by Schlechter in 1818. The most widely known species is T. modestus, a name which can be confused with reichenbachanthus modestus, a synonym of S. brasiliensis. The name Tetragamestus is widely used by orchid enthusiasts, many of whom reject the inclusion of this genus in Scaphyglottis.

Reichenbachanthus: João Barbosa Rodrigues published Reichenbachanthus modestus in 1882. Four species of pendant epiphytes which occur from Central America to southeastern Brazil in tropical rain forests have been included in this genus, the last in 1997 by Dressler. The terete (= narrowly cylindrical) pseudobulb is difficult to distinguish from the single terete leaf. The base of the full or slightly trilobate lip forms a nectary together with the column, the column foot, and the base of the lateral sepals. The column is long and thick with an apical anther containing four pollinia. The pale yellow or green flowers feature lanceolate petals, smaller than the sepals.

- Reichenbachanthus modestus, originally published as Fractiunguis brasiliensis and also published in 1877 as Hexisea reflexa (Reichenbach) is now Scaphyglottis reflexa.
- Reichenbachanthus reflexus, also published as Fractiunguis reflexus and Hexisea reflexa is now Scaphyglottis emarginata.
- Reichenbachanthus cuniculatus, originally published as Fractiunguis cuniculatus in 1923, also published as Hexisea cuniculata in 1925, is now Scaphyglottis cuniculata (Schltr.) Dressler (2002).
- Reichenbachanthus subulatus (Schltr.) Dressler (1997) was originally published as Scaphyglottis subulata Schltr. (1910). It has also been published as Reichenbachanthus lankesteri (Ames) DE Mora-Retana & JB García-Castro (1992) and Hexisea lankesteri Ames (1925).

Fractiunguis was published by Schlechter in 1922, and has been considered a synonym of Reichenbachanthus almost from that time. It consisted of three species:

- Fractiunguis reflexus Schlechter (1922)
- Fractiunguis cuniculatus Schlechter (1923)
- Fractiunguis cuniculatus var gracilis Schlechter (1923)

Hexisea: In 1834, John Lindley published Hexisea bidentata. The generic epithet refers to the six perianth segments being nearly equal in size and shape. Fourteen species have been placed in this genus before it was reduced to synonymy under Scaphyglottis, despite having priority to Scaphyglottis.

The plants are epiphytic or rupicolous (rock dwelling) and caespitose, sometimes hanging down from branches of trees. They grow naturally in tropical and equatorial, humid, low-altitude forests from southern Mexico to northern and northwestern South America.

The original two species (H. bidentata and H. imbricata, originally published as H. bidentata var. imbricata) are distinguished from Scaphyglottis by small, almost entirely red flowers, with nearly equal perianth segments. It is the only group pollinated by hummingbirds.

The vegetative morphology is similar to Scaphyglottis. The pseudobulbs are typically cylindrical or fusiform, bear deciduous linear-lanceolate leaves, and grow one from at the apex of another to form articulated chains. The racemose inflorescence is apical or from the nodes of the joints between pseudobulbs, with few flowers open simultaneously (generally only two or three) being produced over several years.

The red or orange flowers have lanceolate sepals and petals. The labellum is simple and folded down, the same color as the other perianth segments. In some species (e.g., H. bidentata) there is a bright yellow callus in the form of two teeth near the base of the labellum. The pollinarium contains four pollinia.

According to the rules of the International Code of Botanical Nomenclature, Hexisea is the name that should be used for all Scaphyglottis, because the name Hexisea (for one of these species) was published before Scaphyglottis. However, Dressler suggested that the name Scaphyglottis be retained to avoid changing the names of a large number of well known species., and that the formally correct name Hexisea be used only when referring to those species which had been traditionally known as Hexisea. On the strength of this recommendation, Kew has made Scaphyglottis the accepted name, and reduced the correct name Hexisea to synonymy.

Euothonaea was published by Reichenbach in 1852, but was invalid for technical reasons This genus has always been relegated to synonomy under Hexisea.

- Euothonea oppositifolia (A.Rich. & Galeotti) Rchb.f. (1852) was previously published as Epidendrum oppositifoliium A.Rich. & Galeotti (1854). In 1850, it was published as Diothonea oppositifolia (A.Rich. & Galeotti) Rchb.f. and in 1862 as Hexisea oppositifolia (A.Rich. & Galeotti) Rchb.f. In 2002, Dressler reduced it to synonymy under Hexisea imbricata by publishing the name Scaphpyglottis imbricata.

Costaricaea was erected by Schlechter in 1923 for Costaricaea amparoana, which was moved to Hexisea amparoana in 1934 and then to Scaphyglottis amparoana in 1964.

Platyglottis was proposed in 1942 by Louis Otto Williams for the new Panamanian species Platyglottis coriacea. In 2004, Dressler transferred it to Scaphyglottis coriaceae. Although the pseudobulbs of this species grow from the apices of previous pseudobulbs like the rest of the genus Scaphyglottis, this species differs by having wide. flat, coriaceous, alternate leaves, and an apical racemose inflorescence with up to four pale flowers open at once, featuring long ovaries and large bracts at the base of the peduncle. Both the vegetative and floral morphology make this species easy to distinguish for the other species of Scaphyglottis.

Helleriella. In 1974 Garay and Sweet transferred Scaphyglottis punctulata (Reichenbach f.) C. Schweinfurth, (Ponera punctulata Reichenbach f., Epidendrum dussii Cogniaux) to the Andean genus Helleriella without any explanation. A comparison of S. punctulata with the two species of Helleriella shows that it fits poorly into that genus. Except for a somewhat unusual habit it is a typical Scaphyglottis. This is also confirmed by molecular data.

=== Subtaxa ===
A study of inner transcribed spacer data has suggested that the illegitimate name Pachystele Schltr. (1923) corresponds to a well-supported clade distinct from the remainder of the modern concept of Scaphyglottis, as does the species S. livida. The authors of the study noted that this "Pachystele clade" corresponds roughly to Hexisea sensu lato:

- S. amparoana
- S. arctata
- S. bidentata
- S. chlorantha
- S. confusa
- S. cuniculata
- S. corallorrhiza
- S. densa
- S. fasciculata
- S. gentryi
- S. gigantea
- S. imbricata
- S. jimenezii
- S. reflexa
- S. sigmoidea

The paper did not publish any names for these three suggested sub-taxa of Scaphyglottis, but did publish three new combinations.

=== Species ===
- S. acostaei (Schltr.) C.Schweinf. (1941)
- S. amparoana (Schltr.) Dressler (1964)
- S. antillana is not listed by Kew
- S. arctata (Dressler) B.R.Adams (1988)
- S. atwoodii Dressler (1997)
- S. aurea (Rchb.f.) Foldats (1959)
- S. behrii (Rchb.f.) Benth. & Hook.f. ex Hemsl. (1884)
- S. bicallosa Dressler (2000)
- S. bicornis (Lindl.) Garay (1967)
- S. bidentata (Lindl.) Dressler (2002)
- S. bifida (Rchb.f.) C.Schweinf. (1941)
- S. bilineata (Rchb.f.) Schltr. (1918)
- S. boliviensis (Rolfe) B.R.Adams (1988)
- S. brasiliensis (Schltr.) Dressler (2004)
- S. caricalensis (Kraenzl.) Correll (1941)
- S. cernua Dressler (2004)
- S. chlorantha B.R.Adams (1988)
- S. clavata Dressler (2004)
- S. condorana Dodson (1998)
- S. conferta (Ruiz & Pav.) Poepp. & Endl. (1831)
- S. confusa (Schltr.) Ames & Correll (1942)
- S. corallorrhiza (Ames) Ames, F.T.Hubb. & C.Schweinf. (1934)
- S. coriacea (L.O.Williams) Dressler (2004)
- S. crurigera (Bateman ex Lindl.) Ames & Correll (1942)
- S. cuniculata (Schltr.) Dressler (2002)
- S. densa (Schltr.) B.R.Adams (1988)
- S. dunstervillei (Garay) Foldats (1968)
- S. emarginata (Garay) Dressler (2004)
- S. fasciculata Hook. (1841)
- S. fusiformis (Griseb.) R.E.Schult. (1957)
- S. geminata Dressler & Mora-Ret. (1993)
- S. gentryi Dodson & Monsalve (1998)
- S. gigantea Dressler (1979)
- S. grandiflora Ames & C.Schweinf. (1931)
- S. hirtzii Dodson (1998)
- S. hondurensis (Ames) L.O.Williams (1950)
- S. imbricata (Lindl.) Dressler (2002)
- S. jimenezii Schltr. (1918)
- S. laevilabium Ames (1921)
- S. leucantha Rchb.f. (1850)
- S. limonensis B.R.Adams (1988)
- S. lindeniana (A.Rich. & Galeotti) L.O.Williams (1941)
- S. livida (Lindl.) Schltr. (1918)
- S. longicaulis S.Watson (1888)
- S. mesocopis (Endres & Rchb.f.) Benth. & Hook.f. ex Hemsl. (1884)
- S. michelangeliorum Carnevali & Steyerm. (1984)
- S. micrantha (Lindl.) Ames & Correll (1942)
- S. minutiflora Ames & Correll (1942)
- S. modesta (Rchb.f.) Schltr. (1926)
- S. monspirrae Dressler (2000)
- S. pachybulbon (Schltr.) Dressler (2000)
- S. panamensis B.R.Adams (1988)
- S. prolifera (R.Br.) Cogn. (1898)
- S. propinqua C.Schweinf. (1955)
- S. pulchella (Schltr.) L.O.Williams (1941)
- S. punctulata (Rchb.f.) C.Schweinf. (1955)
- S. reflexa Lindl. (1939)
- S. robusta B.R.Adams (1988)
- S. sessiliflora B.R.Adams (1988)
- S. sickii Pabst (1956)
- S. sigmoidea (Ames & C.Schweinf.) B.R.Adams (1988)
- S. spathulata C.Schweinf. (1941)
- S. stellata Lodd. ex Lindl. (1839)
- S. sublibera (C.Schweinf.) Dressler (1964)
- S. subulata Schltr. (1910)
- S. summersii L.O.Williams (1940)
- S. tenella L.O.Williams (1941)
- S. tenuis L.O.Williams (1941)
- S. triloba B.R.Adams (1988)

== Distribution ==
Scaphyglottis species grow over a large area, stretching from southern Mexico and the Caribbean Islands to southern Bolivia and much of Brazil, ranging from hot, humid tropical rain forests near sea level through dry forests of the uplands to the cloud forests high in the Andes. The center of diversity is in southern Central America. They usually grow high in trees, or in other highly illuminated locations.

== Cultivated hybrids ==
A few greges produced by hybridizing Scaphyglottis species have been registered:

- Scaphingoa Little Gem was registered in 1964 by WWG Moir with the nothogeneric epithet Domindesmia. It was produced by pollinating a Domingoa haematochila with pollen from a S. pulchella (then known as Hexadesmia pulchella).
- Scaphyglottis (Seahexa) Gold was registered in 1983 by WWG Moir with the nothogeneric epithet Seahexa. It was produced by pollinating a S. pulchella (then known as Hexadesmia pulchella) with a S. aurea (then known as Hexisea aurea).
- Epiglottis Rumrill Elf was registered in 1985 by J Rumrill. It was produced by pollinating a S. crurigera with an Epidendrum radicans.

== Medical use ==
In response to reports of the use of Scaphyglottis species in popular medicine for pain relief, a study was performed which showed that oral administration of certain substances (5alpha-lanosta-24,24-dimethyl-9(11),25-dien-3beta-ol, cyclobalanone, gigantol, and 3,4'-dihydroxy-3',4,5-trimethoxybibenzyl) found in S. livida produced anti-inflammatory and antinociceptive effects in rats and mice, apparently (at least partially) by activation of opioid receptors.
