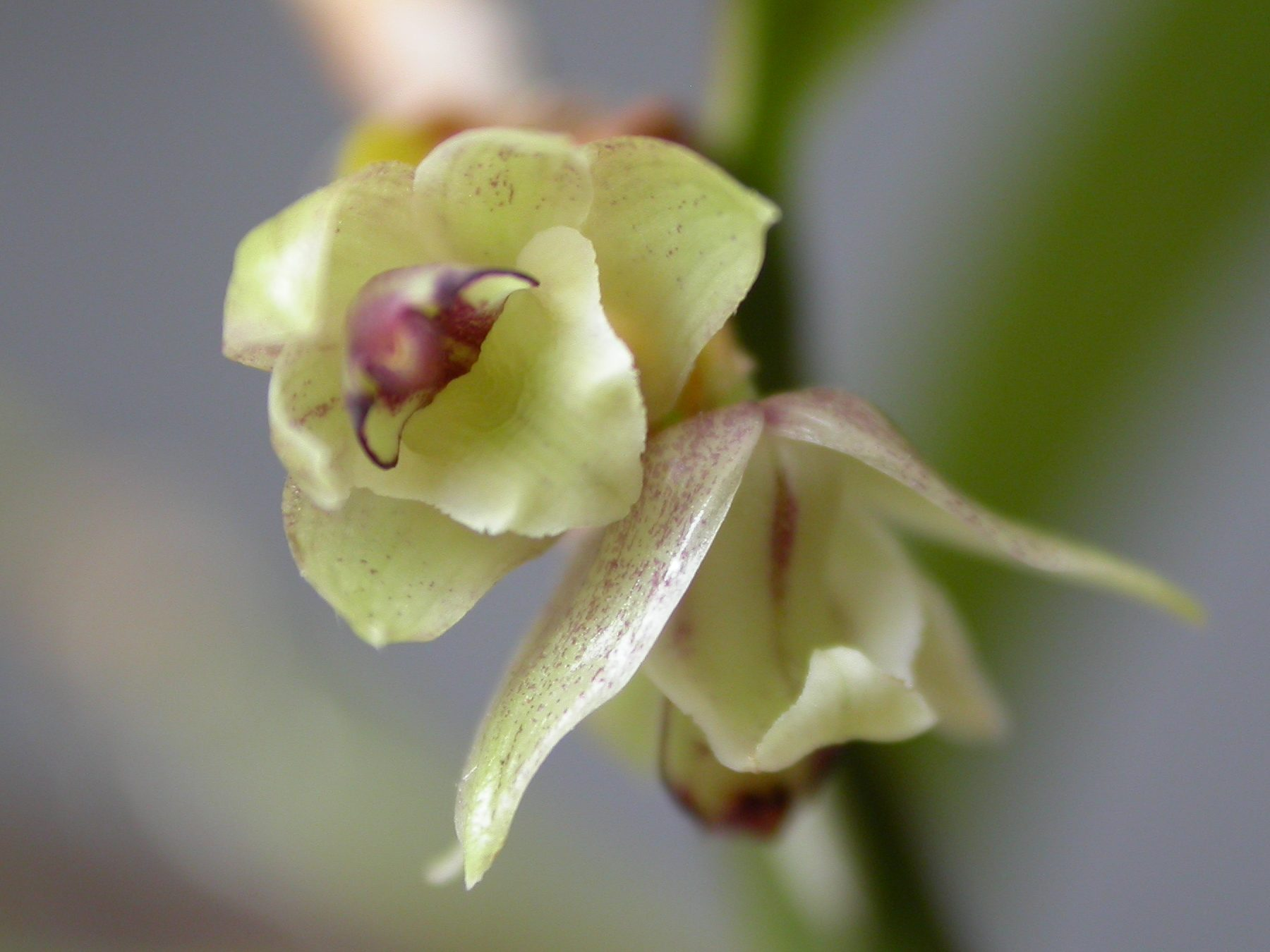
- Flower of Scaphyglottis modesta

Scientific classification
- Kingdom: Plantae
- Clade: Tracheophytes
- Clade: Angiosperms
- Clade: Monocots
- Order: Asparagales
- Family: Orchidaceae
- Subfamily: Epidendroideae
- Genus: Scaphyglottis
- Species: S. modesta

Binomial name
- Scaphyglottis modesta (Rchb.f.) Schltr.

Synonyms
- Tetragamestus modestus Rchb.f. (basionym); Ponera modesta (Rchb.f.) Rchb.f.; Ponera felskyi Rchb.f.; Ponera striolata Rchb.f.; Scaphyglottis felskyi (Rchb.f.) Schltr.; Tetragamestus antillanus Schltr.; Scaphyglottis striolata (Rchb.f.) Correll

= Scaphyglottis modesta =

Species of orchid

Scaphyglottis modesta is a species of orchid native to the Neotropics. Habitats it is found in include the Atlantic Forest ecoregion in southeastern Brazil.
