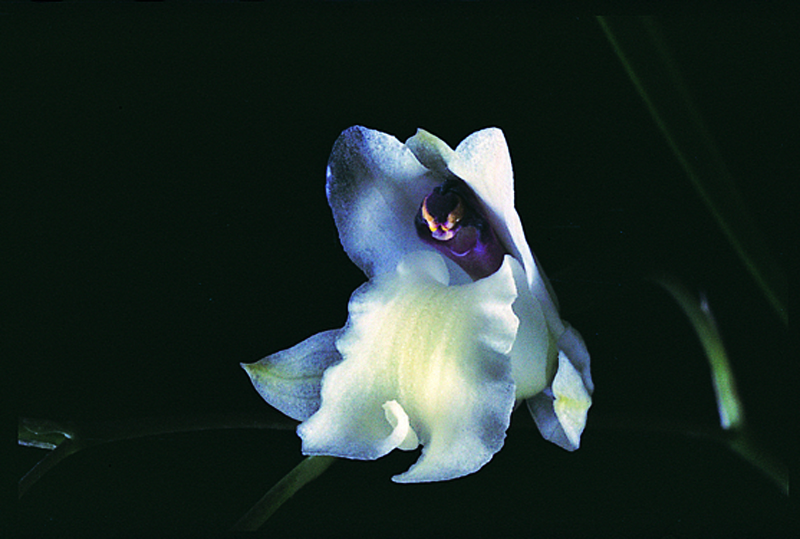
- Flower of Scaphyglottis crurigera

Scientific classification
- Kingdom: Plantae
- Clade: Tracheophytes
- Clade: Angiosperms
- Clade: Monocots
- Order: Asparagales
- Family: Orchidaceae
- Subfamily: Epidendroideae
- Genus: Scaphyglottis
- Species: S. crurigera

Binomial name
- Scaphyglottis crurigera (Bateman ex Lindl.) Ames & Correll

Synonyms
- Hexopia crurigera Bateman ex Lindl. (basionym); Hexadesmia crurigera (Bateman ex Lindl.) Lindl.

= Scaphyglottis crurigera =

Species of orchid

Scaphyglottis crurigera is a species of orchid found from Mexico (Oaxaca, Chiapas) to Ecuador.
