= Pleopeltis segregata =

Conservation status
- Least Concern (IUCN 3.1)

Scientific classification
- Kingdom: Plantae
- Clade: Tracheophytes
- Division: Polypodiophyta
- Class: Polypodiopsida
- Order: Polypodiales
- Suborder: Polypodiineae
- Family: Polypodiaceae
- Genus: Pleopeltis
- Species: P. segregata

Binomial name
- Pleopeltis segregata Baker

Synonyms
- Polypodium segregatum (Baker) A.R.Sm.

Species of fern

Pleopeltis segregata is a species of fern in the family Polypodiaceae. It is endemic to Ecuador. Its natural habitat is subtropical or tropical moist montane forests.
