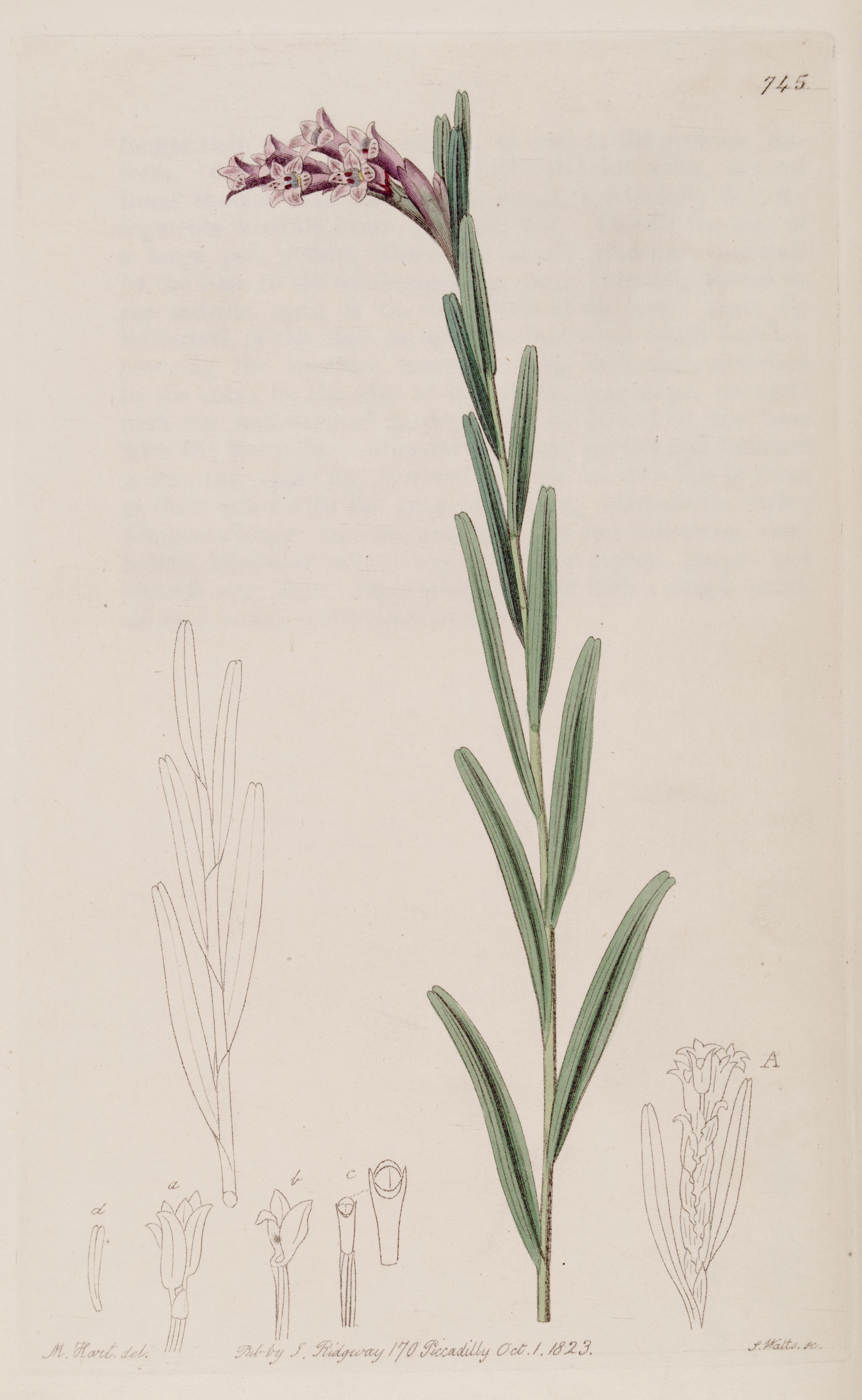

Scientific classification
- Kingdom: Plantae
- Clade: Tracheophytes
- Clade: Angiosperms
- Clade: Monocots
- Order: Asparagales
- Family: Orchidaceae
- Subfamily: Epidendroideae
- Genus: Isochilus
- Species: I. linearis

Binomial name
- Isochilus linearis (Jacq.) R.Br.

Synonyms
- Epidendrum lineare Jacq. (basionym); Cymbidium lineare (Jacq.) Sw.; Leptothrium lineare (Jacq.) Kunth; Coilostylis obtusifolia Raf.; Isochilus leucanthus Barb.Rodr.; Isochilus linearis var. leucanthus (Barb.Rodr.) Cogn.; Isochilus peruvianus Schltr.; Isochilus brasiliensis Schltr.

= Isochilus linearis =

Species of orchid

Isochilus linearis, the narrowleaf equallip orchid, is a species of orchid native to Mexico, the West Indies, Central America and South America.
