= Helleriella =

Scientific classification
- Kingdom: Plantae
- Clade: Tracheophytes
- Clade: Angiosperms
- Clade: Monocots
- Order: Asparagales
- Family: Orchidaceae
- Subfamily: Epidendroideae
- Tribe: Epidendreae
- Subtribe: Ponerinae
- Genus: Helleriella; A.D.Hawkes

Genus of orchids

Helleriella is a genus of flowering plants from the orchid family, Orchidaceae. It contains two known species, native to Mexico and Central America.

- Helleriella guerrerensis Dressler & Hágsater - Guerrero
- Helleriella nicaraguensis A.D.Hawkes - Alex Drum Hawkes - from Chiapas to Panama

== See also ==
- List of Orchidaceae genera
