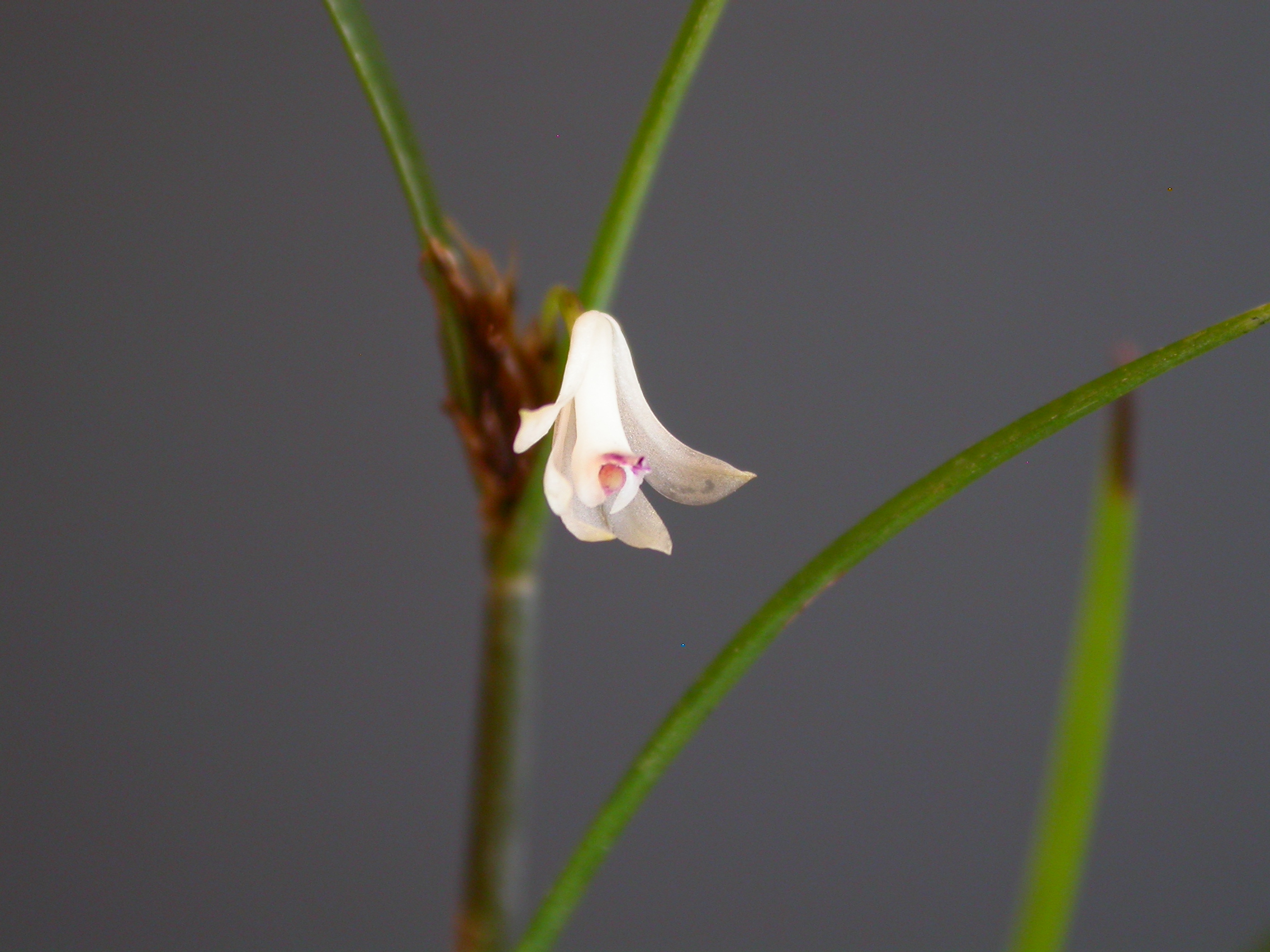
- Flower of Scaphyglottis longicaulis

Scientific classification
- Kingdom: Plantae
- Clade: Tracheophytes
- Clade: Angiosperms
- Clade: Monocots
- Order: Asparagales
- Family: Orchidaceae
- Subfamily: Epidendroideae
- Genus: Scaphyglottis
- Species: S. longicaulis

Binomial name
- Scaphyglottis longicaulis S.Watson

Synonyms
- Scaphyglottis unguiculata Schltr.; Scaphyglottis chocoana I.Bock

= Scaphyglottis longicaulis =

Species of orchid

Scaphyglottis longicaulis is a species of orchid found from Central America to northwestern Ecuador. It has been found as an epiphyte growing on Socratea exorrhiza in Panama.

== References and external links ==
- Media related to Scaphyglottis longicaulis at Wikimedia Commons
