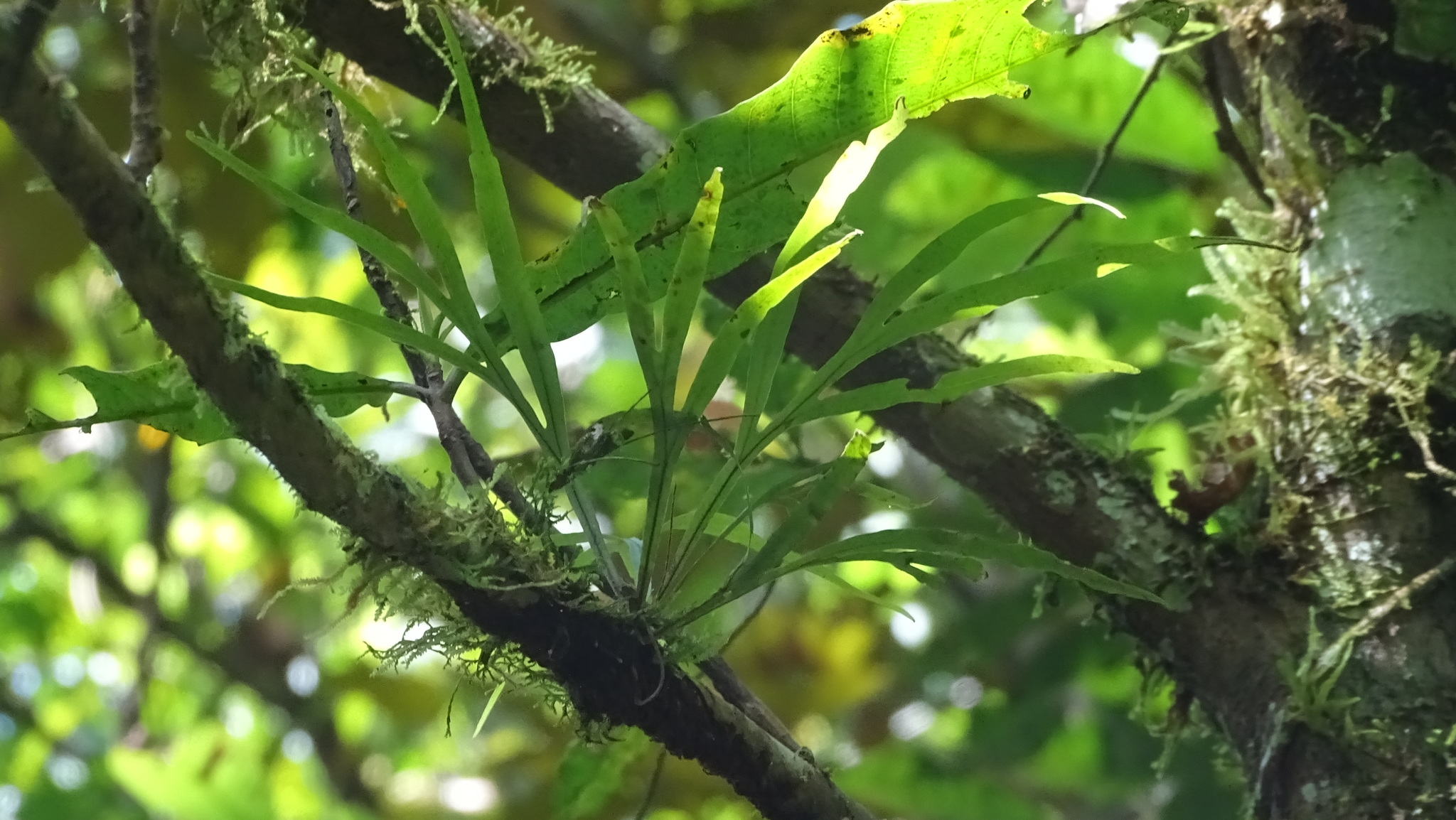

Scientific classification
- Kingdom: Plantae
- Clade: Tracheophytes
- Division: Polypodiophyta
- Class: Polypodiopsida
- Order: Polypodiales
- Suborder: Polypodiineae
- Family: Polypodiaceae
- Genus: Pleopeltis
- Species: P. christensenii

Binomial name
- Pleopeltis christensenii A.R.Sm.

Synonyms
- Eschatogramme panamensis C.Chr.; Dicranoglossum panamense (C.Chr.) L.D.Gómez

= Pleopeltis christensenii =

Species of plant

== Description ==
Pleopeltis christensenii is a species of fern from the genus Pleopeltis'.

== Range ==
According to GBIF the plant has primarily been observed from Honduras in the north to Ecuador in the south.
