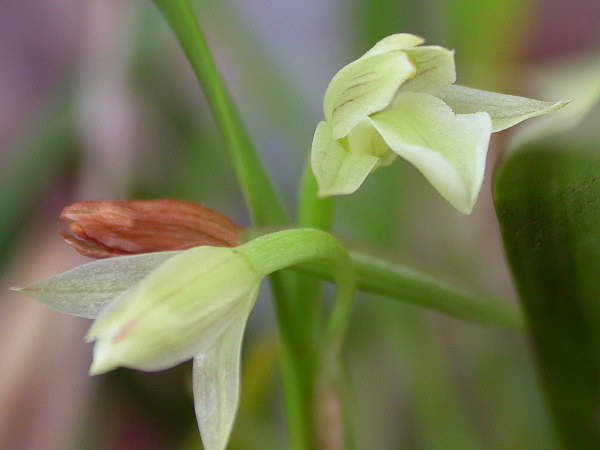
- Flower of Scaphyglottis prolifera

Scientific classification
- Kingdom: Plantae
- Clade: Tracheophytes
- Clade: Angiosperms
- Clade: Monocots
- Order: Asparagales
- Family: Orchidaceae
- Subfamily: Epidendroideae
- Genus: Scaphyglottis
- Species: S. prolifera

Binomial name
- Scaphyglottis prolifera (R.Br.) Cogn.

Synonyms
- Isochilus proliferus R.Br. (basionym); Scaphyglottis cuneata Schltr.; Tetragamestus gracilis Schltr.; Scaphyglottis gracilis (Schltr.) Schltr.; Scaphyglottis wercklei Schltr.; Ponera mapiriensis Kraenzl.

= Scaphyglottis prolifera =

Species of orchid

Scaphyglottis prolifera is a species of orchid native to the Neotropics.
