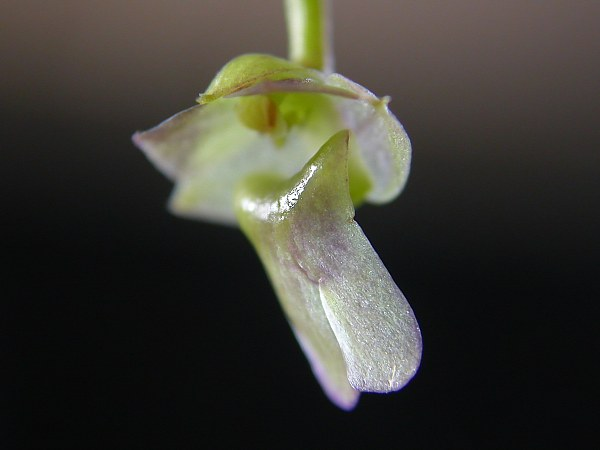
- Flower of Scaphyglottis livida

Scientific classification
- Kingdom: Plantae
- Clade: Tracheophytes
- Clade: Angiosperms
- Clade: Monocots
- Order: Asparagales
- Family: Orchidaceae
- Subfamily: Epidendroideae
- Genus: Scaphyglottis
- Species: S. livida

Binomial name
- Scaphyglottis livida (Lindl.) Schltr.

Synonyms
- Hexadesmia monophylla Barb.Rodr.; Hexadesmia reedii Rchb.f.; Hexadesmia sessilis Rchb.f.; Isochilus dubius A.Rich. & Galeotti; Isochilus lividus Lindl. (basionym); Leaoa monophylla (Barb.Rodr.) Schltr. & Porto; Leaoa reedii (Rchb.f.) Garay; Pachystele dubia (A.Rich. & Galeotti) Schltr.; Pachystele livida (Lindl.) Brieger; Pachystelis dubia (A.Rich. & Galeotti) Rauschert; Pachystelis livida (Lindl.) Rauschert; Ponera dubia (A.Rich. & Galeotti) Rchb.f.; Scaphyglottis dubia (A.Rich. & Galeotti) Benth. & Hook.f. ex Hemsl.; Scaphyglottis purpusii Schltr.; Scaphyglottis reedii (Rchb.f.) Ames; Scaphyglottis sessilis (Rchb.f.) Foldats

= Scaphyglottis livida =

Species of orchid

Scaphyglottis livida is a species of orchid found from Mexico to tropical South America.

== Distribution and habitat ==
S. livida has been found to grow as an epiphyte in gallery forests and on rocks in Cerrado vegetation. Occurrence records in Brazil's states include Parana, Rio de Janeiro, Espirito Santo, Goias, Bahia, Pernambuco, and Ceara.
