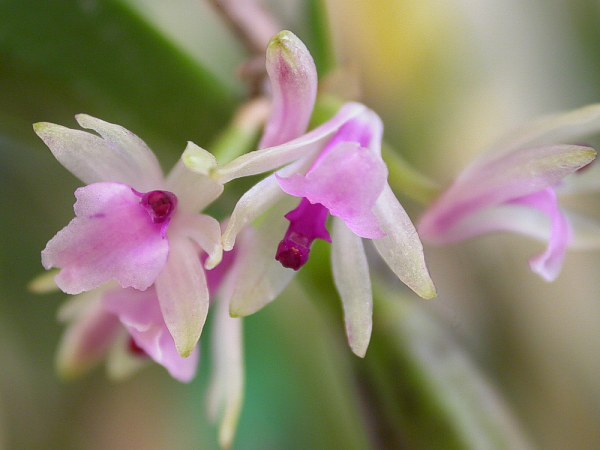
- Flower of Scaphyglottis stellata

Scientific classification
- Kingdom: Plantae
- Clade: Tracheophytes
- Clade: Angiosperms
- Clade: Monocots
- Order: Asparagales
- Family: Orchidaceae
- Subfamily: Epidendroideae
- Genus: Scaphyglottis
- Species: S. stellata

Binomial name
- Scaphyglottis stellata Lodd. ex Lindl.

Synonyms
- Ponera stellata (Lodd. ex Lindl.) Rchb.f.; Ponera amethystina Rchb.f.; Scaphyglottis brachiata Schltr.; Scaphyglottis ochroleuca Schltr.; Scaphyglottis amethystina (Rchb.f.) Schltr.; Scaphyglottis floribunda Mansf.

= Scaphyglottis stellata =

Species of orchid

Scaphyglottis stellata is a species of orchid occurring from Central America to tropical South America.
