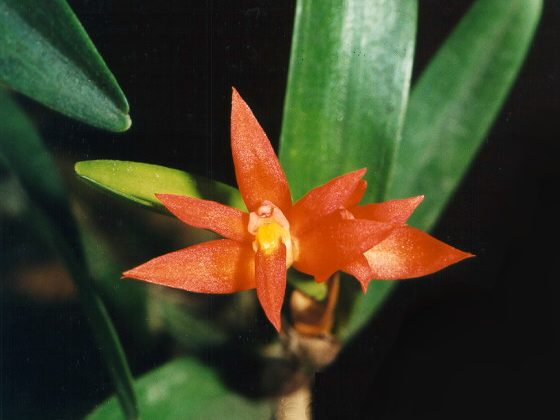
- Flower of Scaphyglottis imbricata

Scientific classification
- Kingdom: Plantae
- Clade: Tracheophytes
- Clade: Angiosperms
- Clade: Monocots
- Order: Asparagales
- Family: Orchidaceae
- Subfamily: Epidendroideae
- Genus: Scaphyglottis
- Species: S. imbricata

Binomial name
- Scaphyglottis imbricata (Lindl.) Dressler

Synonyms
- Diothonea imbricata Lindl. (basionym); Epidendrum oppositifolium A.Rich. & Galeotti; Diothonea oppositifolia (A.Rich. & Galeotti) Rchb.f.; Hexisea bidentata var. imbricata (Lindl.) C.Schweinf.; Euothonaea imbricata (Lindl.) Rchb.f.; Euothonaea oppositifolia (A.Rich. & Galeotti) Rchb.f.; Hexisea imbricata (Lindl.) Rchb.f.; Hexisea oppositifolia (A.Rich. & Galeotti) Rchb.f.

= Scaphyglottis imbricata =

Species of orchid

Scaphyglottis imbricata is a species of orchid found from Mexico to northern and western South America.
