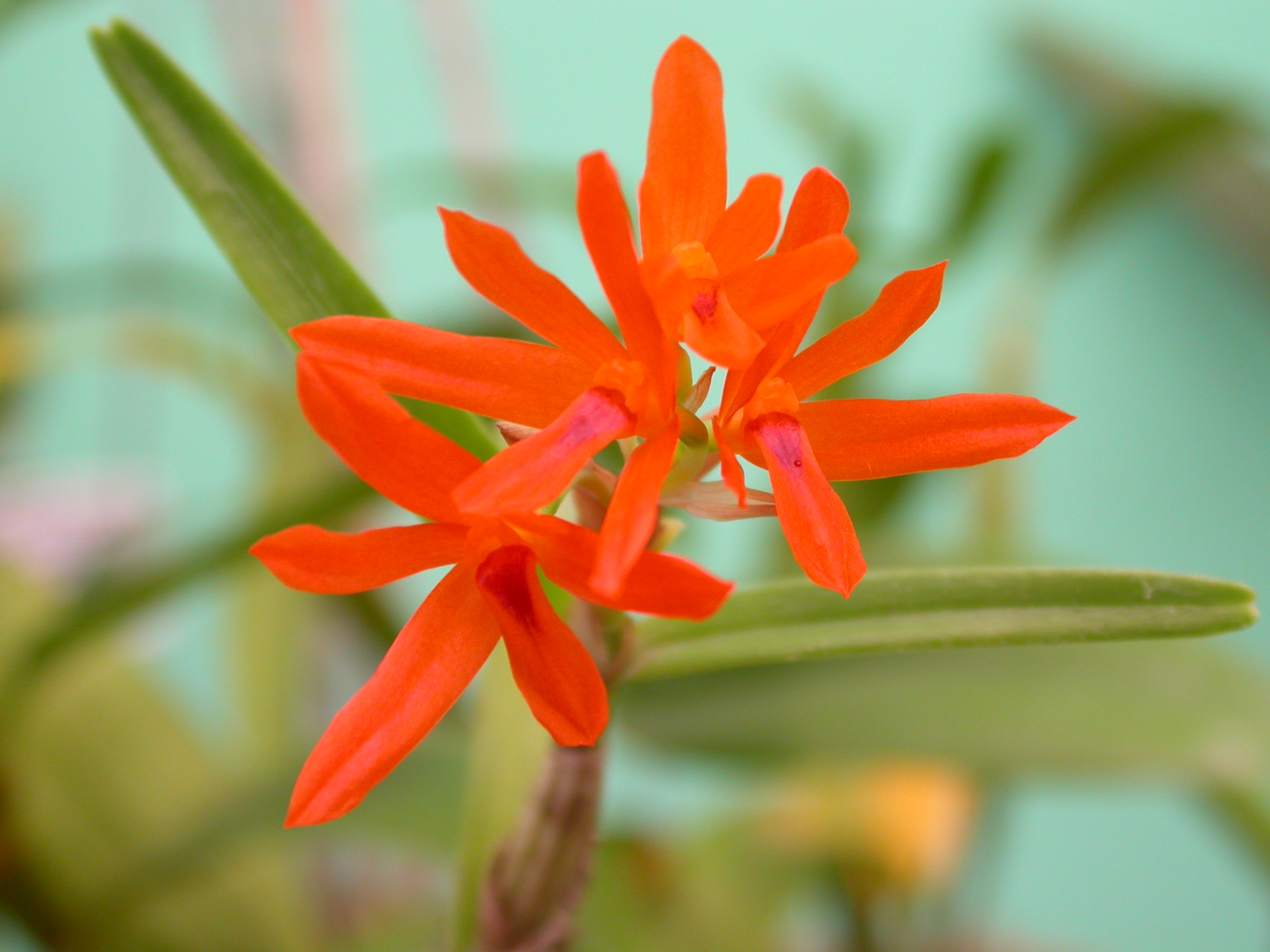
- Flower of Scaphyglottis bidentata

Scientific classification
- Kingdom: Plantae
- Clade: Tracheophytes
- Clade: Angiosperms
- Clade: Monocots
- Order: Asparagales
- Family: Orchidaceae
- Subfamily: Epidendroideae
- Genus: Scaphyglottis
- Species: S. bidentata

Binomial name
- Scaphyglottis bidentata (Lindl.) Dressler

Synonyms
- Hexisea bidentata Lindl. (basionym)

= Scaphyglottis bidentata =

Species of orchid

Scaphyglottis bidentata is a species of orchid found in the American tropics from Costa Rica to northern Brazil. It is the type species of the genus Hexisea, and was published before the generic epithet Scaphyglottis. In a reversal of the usual rules for taxonomy, the genus Scaphyglotts was conserved against Hexisea when the two genera were combined.
