= Alex Drum Hawkes =

British botanist (1927-1977)

- Born: 1927; Houlton, Maine
- Died: 1977 (aged 49–50); Kingston, Jamaica
- Citizenship: American
- Education: University of Miami
- Scientific career
- Fields: Botany, cooking
- Author abbrev. (botany): A.D.Hawkes

Alex Drum Hawkes (1927–1977) was an American botanist and cookbook author who lived in Coconut Grove, Florida and Kingston, Jamaica. Hawkes specialized in orchids, bromeliads, palm trees, fruits, vegetables, and nuts. Named the orchid genera Flickingeria, and Paraphalaenopsis and travelled the world extensively, particularly the Caribbean and Latin America during the 1940s to the 1970s collecting plants and authentic regional recipes.

== Publications ==
=== Cookbooks and recipes ===
- Editor of The Horticulture Publications, Coconut Grove, Florida
- Editor of COOKERY NOTES (1960s-70s) Coconut Grove, Florida (FL.) Recipes by Alex D. Hawkes
- South Florida Cookery: Unique Recipes from the Tropics and Elsewhere (1964) Wake-Brook House, Coral Gables, Florida
- Tropical Cookery (1960s)
- The Shrimp Cookbook: 140 Wonderful Ways To Serve Shrimp (1966) Culinary Arts Institute, Chicago, Illinois
- A World of Vegetable Cookery: An encyclopedic treasury of recipes, botany, and lore of the vegetable kingdom (1968) Simon & Schuster, New York [Rev. ed. 1984] illustrations by Bill Goldsmith
- Cooking with vegetables : an encyclopedic treasury of recipes, botany, and lore of the vegetable kingdom (REVISED)
- Eating Out in Jamaica: A Unique Guide to Good Eating (1971) DMP Publications Ltd., Kingston, Jamaica
- The Rum Cookbook (1972) William Collins & Sangster, Jamaica Photography by Maria LaYacona
- The Flavors of The Caribbean & Latin America: a personal collection of recipes (1977) Viking, New York illustrations by Lynda West Compiled & Foreword by Elisabeth Lambert Ortiz

=== Botanical works ===
- The Gardener's Pocketbook (1950) The National Horticultural Magazine
- The Major Kinds of Palms (1950 - 1952) Fairchild Tropical Garden, Coconut Grove / Coral Gables, Florida
- The Orchid Journal An International Review of Orchidology (1952 - 1953) Berkeley, California - Official Publication of The International Orchid Society
- Orchid Weekly (1958-1967) The Horticulture Publications, Coconut Grove, Florida
- Palm Papers (1950s) The Horticulture Publications, Coconut Grove, Florida
- Bromeliad Papers (1958-1967) The Horticulture Publications, Coconut Grove, Florida
- Tropical Plants (1950s-1960s) The Horticulture Publications, Coconut Grove, Florida
- Cultural Directions For Orchids (1959) The Horticultural Publications
- Orchids Their Botany & Culture (1961) Harper & Brothers, New York
- Tropics Magazine (1962) © Alex D. Hawkes (The Horticulture Publications, Coconut Grove, Florida)
- The Four Arts Garden : history and catalogue of the labeled plants (1964) Garden Club of Palm Beach, Florida
- Encyclopedia of Cultivated Orchids, an illustrated descriptive manual of the members of the Orchidaceae currently in cultivation (1965) Faber & Faber, London
- Guide to Plants of the Everglades National Park (1965) Tropic Isle Publishers, Coral Gables, Florida
- A Plantman's Guide to Jamaica (1969)
- Wild Flowers of Jamaica (1974) Collins & Sangster, Great Britain illustrations by Brenda C. Sutton
- Illustrated Plants of Jamaica (1974) J. Wray & Nephew, Jamaica

== Homages ==
The following plants or genera were named by Hawkes or in his honor:

Genera

- (Orchidaceae) Flickingeria
- (Orchidaceae) Grafia (now Phalaenopsis)
- (Orchidaceae) Helleriella
- (Orchidaceae) Hellerorchis
- (Orchidaceae) Katherinea
- (Orchidaceae) Mendoncella
- (Orchidaceae) Paraphalaenopsis

Hybrids

- (Bromeliaceae) Neoregelia 'Alex D. Hawkes' tristis X marmorata Flickinger, 1960
- (Orchidaceae) Brassavola 'Yaki' Brassavola cucullata × B. nodosa A.D.Hawkes, 1946
- (Orchidaceae) Cymbidium 'Katherine Hawkes Chatham' Cym. Dainty × Cym. floribundum A.D.Hawkes, 1964
- (Orchidaceae) Encyclia 'Alex Hawkes' Encyclia oncidioides × Encyclia diurna Moir, 1969
- (Orchidaceae) Prosavola 'Alex Hawkes' Brassavola nodosa x Prosthechea mariae Flickinger, 1964
- (Orchidaceae) Renanthera 'Alex Hawkes' Renanthera coccinea x Renanthera storiei Moir, 1954
- (Orchidaceae) × Rhyncholaeliocattleya 'Alex Hawkes' Rhyncholaeliocattleya cliftonii x Cattleya Mount Royal Wright, 1949

Species

- (Orchidaceae) Aporum hendersonii syn. Dendrobium hendersonii syn. Dendrobium rudolphii A.D.Hawkes & A.H.Heller, 1957
- (Orchidaceae) Dendrobium garayanum A.D.Hawkes & A.H.Heller, 1957
- (Orchidaceae) Dendrobium hawkesii A.H.Heller, 1957
- (Orchidaceae) Dendrobium hellerianum A.D.Hawkes, 1957
- (Orchidaceae) Epidendrum hawkesii A.H.Heller, 1966
- (Orchidaceae) Epidendrum hellerianum A.D.Hawkes, 1966
- (Orchidaceae) Helleriella nicaraguensis A.D.Hawkes, 1966
- (Orchidaceae) Hellerorchis handroi syn. Gomesa handroi syn. Rodrigueziella handroi A.D.Hawkes, 1959
- (Orchidaceae) Hellerorchis gomezioides (Barb.Rodr.) syn. Gomesa gomezoides A.D.Hawkes, 1959
- (Orchidaceae) Lepanthes helleri A.D.Hawkes, 1966
- (Orchidaceae) Mycaranthes hawkesii A.H.Heller, 1983
- (Orchidaceae) Pecteilis hawkesiana King & Pantl., 2003
- (Orchidaceae) Pleurothallis helleri A.D.Hawkes, 1966
- (Orchidaceae) Pleurothallis hawkesii syn. Restrepia brachypus A.D.Hawkes, 1963
- (Orchidaceae) Sobralia hawkesii A.H.Heller, 1966
- (Orchidaceae) Sobralia helleri A.D.Hawkes, 1966
- (Orchidaceae) Tolumnia hawkesiana Moir, 1986
- (Orchidaceae) Vanilla helleri A.D.Hawkes, 1966
- (Moraceae) Coussapoa cayennensis A.D.Hawkes, 1948
