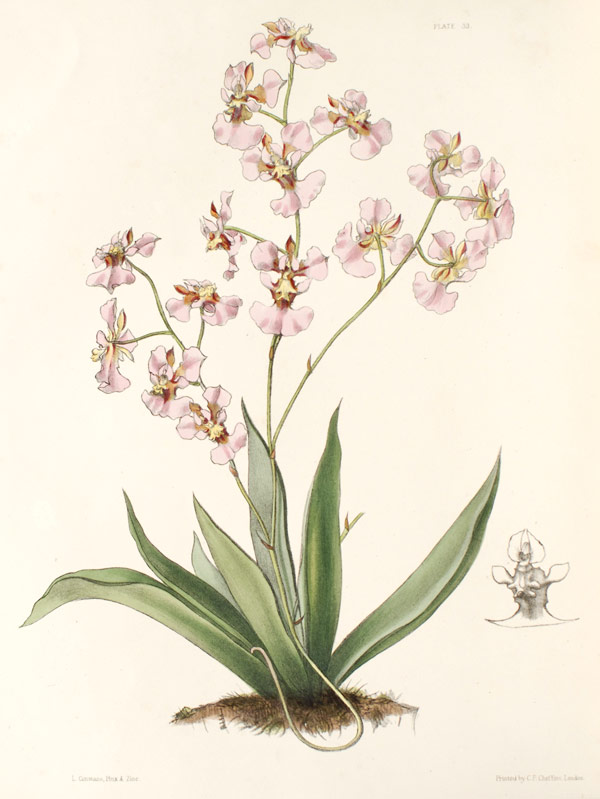
- Illustration of Tolumnia variegata

Conservation status
- Least Concern (IUCN 3.1)

Scientific classification
- Kingdom: Plantae
- Clade: Tracheophytes
- Clade: Angiosperms
- Clade: Monocots
- Order: Asparagales
- Family: Orchidaceae
- Subfamily: Epidendroideae
- Genus: Tolumnia
- Species: T. variegata

Binomial name
- Tolumnia variegata (Sw.) Braem

Synonyms
- Epidendrum variegatum Sw.; Epidendrum carinatum Vahl; Cymbidium variegatum (Sw.) Sw.; Oncidium variegatum (Sw.) Sw.; Oncidium velutinum Lindl. & Paxton; Oncidium leiboldii Rchb.f.; Oncidium variegatum var. velutinum (Lindl. & Paxton) Griseb.; Epidendrum haseltonianum A.D.Hawkes; Oncidium leiboldii var. album Moir & A.D.Hawkes; Oncidium leiboldii var. majus Moir & A.D.Hawkes; Oncidium variegatum var. purpureum Moir & A.D.Hawkes; Oncidium variegatum var. roseum Moir & A.D.Hawkes; Oncidium velutinum var. purpureum Moir; Oncidium caymanense Moir; Oncidium furcyense Moir; Oncidium cubense Moir; Oncidium varvelum Moir; Oncidium variegatum f. album (Moir & A.D.Hawkes) Withner; Oncidium variegatum f. furcyense (Moir) Withner; Oncidium variegatum f. majus (Moir & A.D.Hawkes) Withner; Oncidium variegatum f. purpureum (Moir) Withner; Oncidium variegatum f. roseum (Moir & A.D.Hawkes) Withner; Oncidium variegatum f. varvelum (Moir) Withner; Oncidium variegatum subsp. leiboldii (Rchb.f.) Withner; Oncidium variegatum subsp. velutinum (Lindl. & Paxton) Withner; Tolumnia caymanensis (Moir) Braem; Tolumnia leiboldii (Rchb.f.) Braem; Tolumnia velutina (Lindl. & Paxton) Braem; Tolumnia borinquinensis Sauleda & Ragan

= Tolumnia variegata =

Species of orchid

Tolumnia variegata, commonly known as the harlequin dancing-lady orchid or variegated oncidium in English and as angelito or angelitos in Spanish, is a species of orchid native to the Caribbean.

== Distribution and habitat ==
T. variegata is native to the Cayman Islands (Grand Cayman), Cuba, the Dominican Republic, Haiti, Puerto Rico, the British Virgin Islands, and the United States Virgin Islands. It inhabits both moist and dry forests at all but the highest elevations, and is the most widespread member of the genus Tolumnia.

== Description ==
T. variegata is a stoloniferous plant with flattened pseudobulbs. Plants are variable in size. The leaves are long with a pointed tip, measuring approximately 12 cm (4.7 in) long and 1.5 cm (0.59 in) wide. The inflorescence grows to 40 cm (16 in) long, bearing up to 30 flowers. The flowers are highly variable in size, shape, and colouration, but are usually white (sometimes pink) with a yellow column and brown to purple spots on the labellum.

== Ecology ==
T. variegata is an epiphyte that grows on the branches of trees and shrubs, including calabash, guava, citrus, and coffee plants. Flowering occurs in spring and fall.
