= Dancing-lady orchid =

Dancing-lady orchid is a common name for several orchids and may refer to:

- Oncidium
- Tolumnia (plant)
- Trichocentrum
