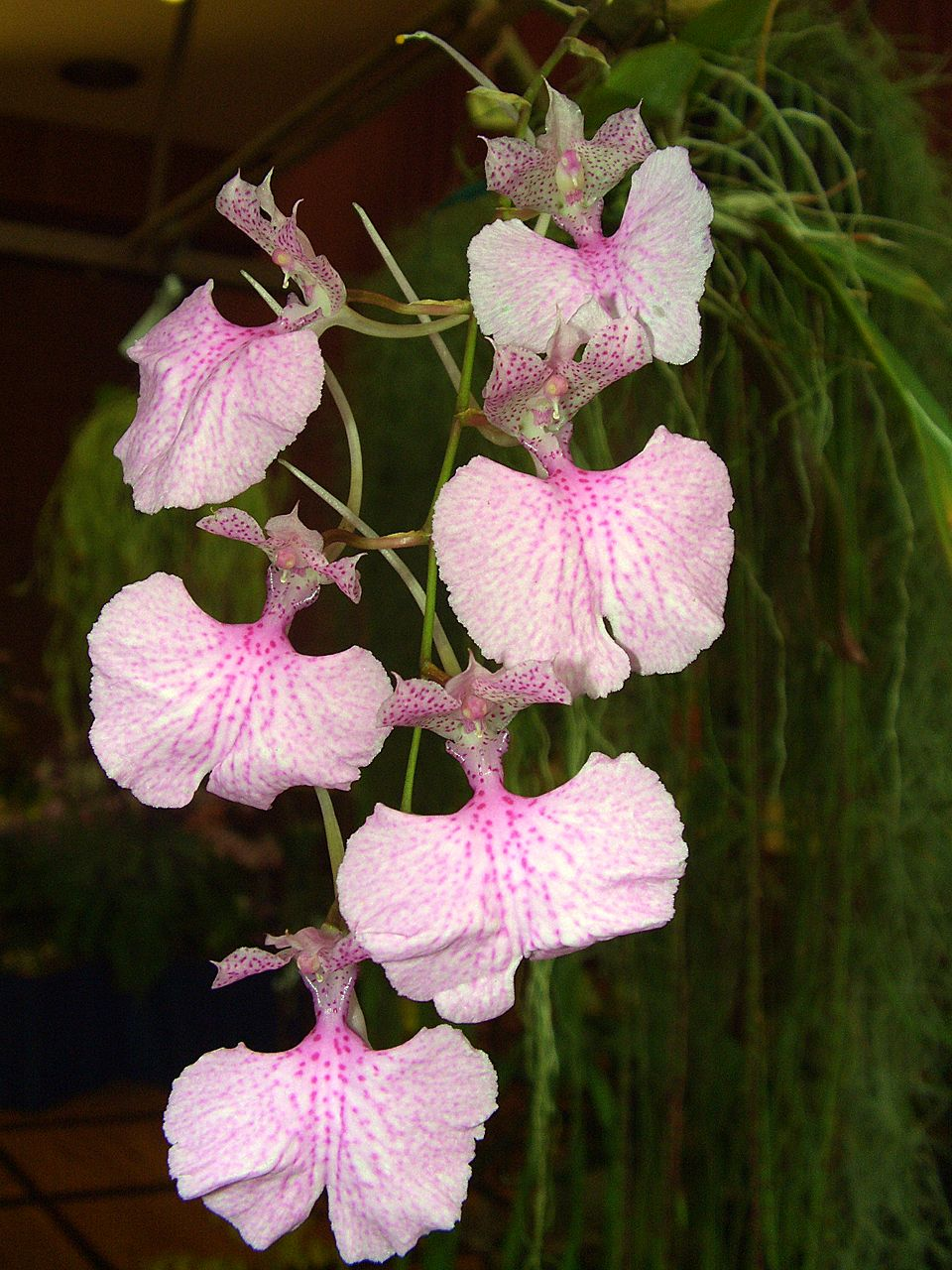

Scientific classification
- Kingdom: Plantae
- Clade: Tracheophytes
- Clade: Angiosperms
- Clade: Monocots
- Order: Asparagales
- Family: Orchidaceae
- Subfamily: Epidendroideae
- Genus: Comparettia
- Species: C. macroplectron

Binomial name
- Comparettia macroplectron Rchb.f. & Triana (1878)

= Comparettia macroplectron =

Species of orchid

Comparettia macroplectron is an epiphytic species of orchid. It is endemic to Colombia.
