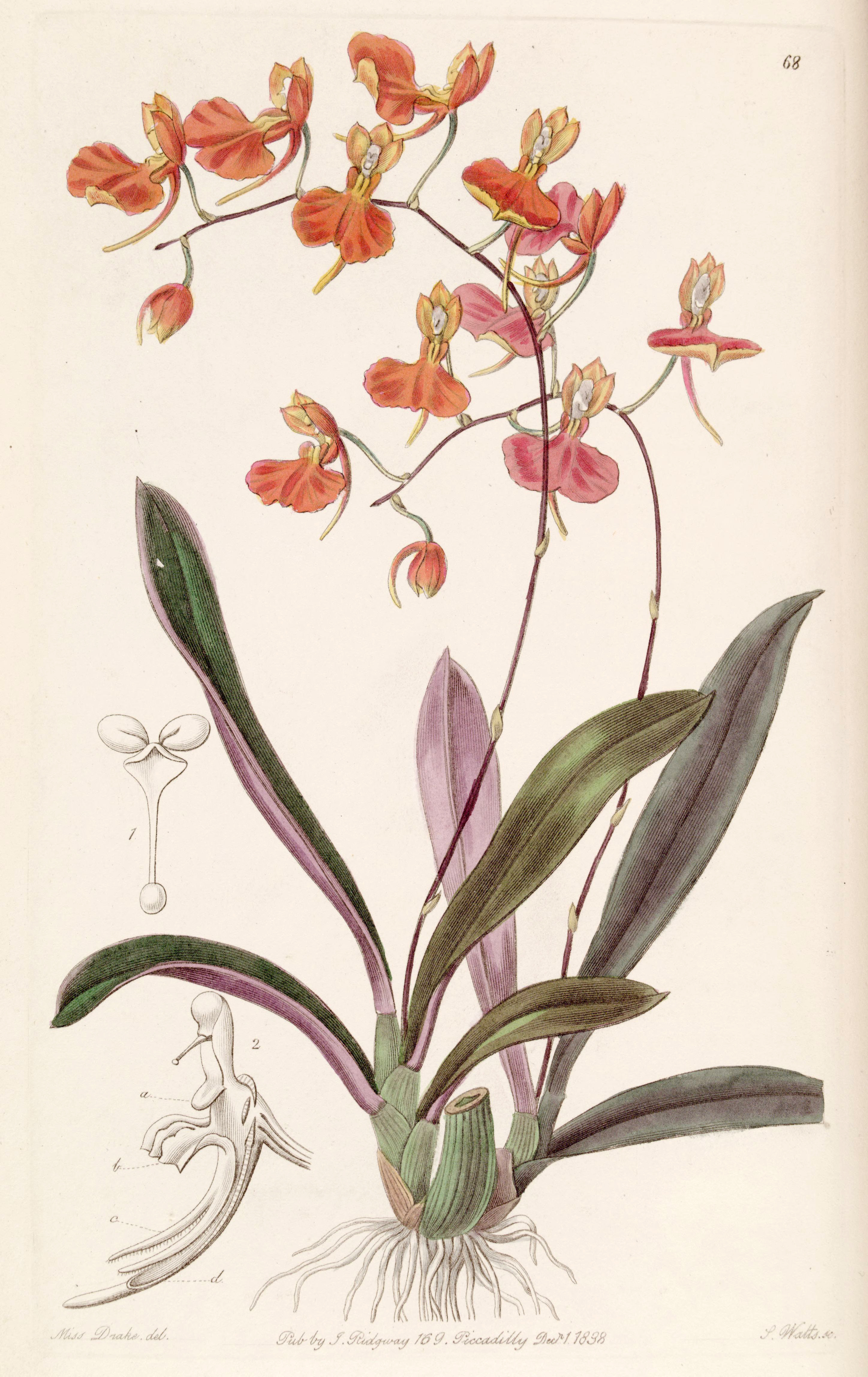
- 1838 illustration from Edwards's Botanical Register

Scientific classification
- Kingdom: Plantae
- Clade: Embryophytes
- Clade: Tracheophytes
- Clade: Spermatophytes
- Clade: Angiosperms
- Clade: Monocots
- Order: Asparagales
- Family: Orchidaceae
- Subfamily: Epidendroideae
- Genus: Comparettia
- Species: C. coccinea

Binomial name
- Comparettia coccinea Lindl., 1838

= Comparettia coccinea =

Species of orchid

Comparettia coccinea is a species of orchid. It is native to Venezuela, Peru, Brazil and Bolivia.
