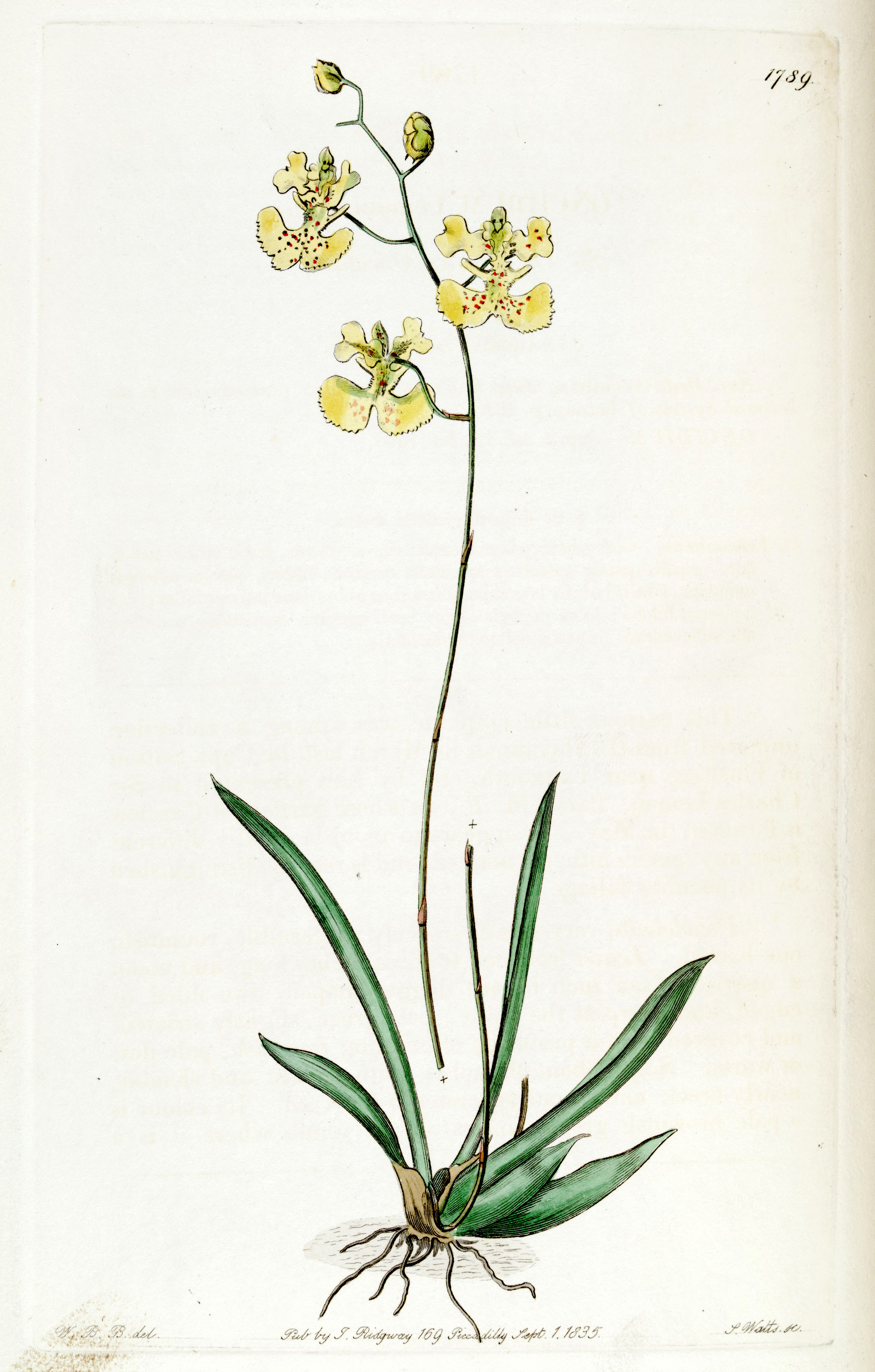
- Tolumnia guianensis flowers

Scientific classification
- Kingdom: Plantae
- Clade: Tracheophytes
- Clade: Angiosperms
- Clade: Monocots
- Order: Asparagales
- Family: Orchidaceae
- Subfamily: Epidendroideae
- Genus: Tolumnia
- Species: T. guianensis

Binomial name
- Tolumnia guianensis (Hayata) Schltr.

Synonyms
- Ophrys guianensis Aubl. (basionym); Ophrys aloidea Poir.; Oncidium intermedium Bertero ex Spreng.; Oncidium lemonianum Lindl.; Oncidium luridum var. intermedium (Knowles & Westc.) Lindl.; Oncidium guttatum var. intermedium (Knowles & Westc.) Rchb.f.; Oncidium desertorum Nash ex Withner; Oncidium intermedium var. alborubrum Moir & A.D.Hawkes; Oncidium intermedium var. album Moir & A.D.Hawkes; Oncidium desertorum var. alborubrum (Moir & A.D.Hawkes) Garay; Oncidium desertorum var. album (Moir & A.D.Hawkes) Garay; Oncidium desertorum var. aureorubrum Moir; Oncidium guianense (Aubl.) Garay; Oncidium guianense var. alborubrum (Moir & A.D.Hawkes) K.S.Wilson; Oncidium guianense var. album (Moir & A.D.Hawkes) K.S.Wilson; Oncidium guianense var. aureorubrum (Moir) K.S.Wilson; Oncidium guianense subsp. alborubrum (Moir & A.D.Hawkes) Withner; Oncidium guianense f. album (Moir & A.D.Hawkes) Withner; Oncidium guianense f. aureorubrum (Moir) Withner; Tolumnia lemoniana (Lindl.) Braem; Tolumnia intermedia (Bertero ex Spreng.) H.Dietr.

= Tolumnia guianensis =

Species of orchid

Tolumnia guianensis is a species of orchid native to Hispaniola.
