= Constance Endicott Hartt =

American botanist (1900–1984)

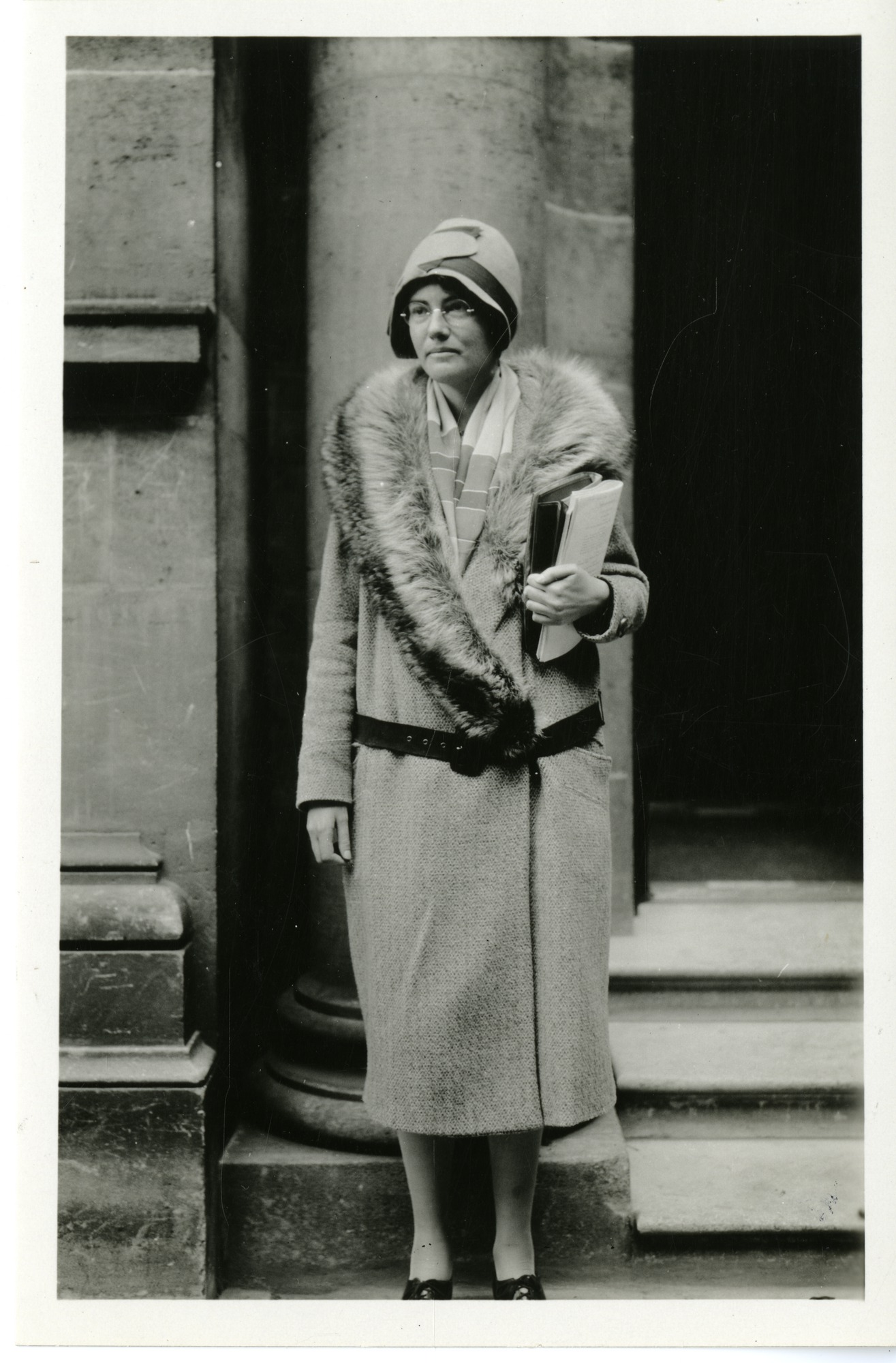
- Constance Endicott Hartt
- Born: Passaic, New Jersey
- Education: Mount Holyoke College

Constance Endicott Hartt (November 2, 1900 – December 21, 1984) was a U.S. botanist notable for her research on sugarcane.

== Early life ==
Constance Endicott Hartt was born in Passaic, New Jersey. She graduated from Mount Holyoke College in 1922. She taught at St. Lawrence University and Connecticut College. She also worked as a botanist for the Hawaiian Sugar Planters' Association. Hartt died in Hawaii in 1984 at the age of 84.

== Research ==
Hartt's research focus was primarily based on sugarcane. The goal of her research was to figure out how the plant makes and stores sugar. Her research would go on to help the sugar industry in Hawaii by assisting farmers grow sugarcane efficiently. Hartt's findings concluded that the more efficient the photosynthesis process, the greater the sugar output of the plant.

Hartt discovered the perfect sunlight/temperature to sugar ratio through radioactive isotopes. She was one of the firsts scientists to use this breakthrough method. These radioactive isotopes would trace the carbon dioxide that was found in the sugarcane until it was transformed into sugar. Hartt's work would go on to ultimately help the Hawaiian economy in sugar production.
