= Pāpaʻikou, Hawaii =

Census-designated place in Hawaii, U.S.

Pāpaʻikou
- Census-designated place
- Location in Hawaii County and the state of Hawaii
- Coordinates: 19°47′38″N 155°5′48″W
- Country: United States
- State: Hawaii
- County: Hawaii

Area
  - Total: 2.17 sq mi (5.62 km^{2})
  - Land: 1.46 sq mi (3.77 km^{2})
  - Water: 0.71 sq mi (1.85 km^{2})
- Elevation: 236 ft (72 m)

Population (2020)
  - Total: 1,166
  - Density: 802.0/sq mi (309.65/km^{2})
- Time zone: UTC-10 (Hawaii-Aleutian)
- ZIP code: 96781
- Area code: 808
- FIPS code: 15-61550
- GNIS feature ID: 0363121

Pāpaʻikou is a census-designated place (CDP) in Hawaii County, Hawaii, United States, and is a few miles north of the county seat, Hilo. The population of Pāpaʻikou was 1,166 at the 2020 census, down from 1,431 at the 2000 census.

Pāpaʻikou was the home of the Onomea Sugar Company. Notable people from Pāpaʻikou include William Whitmore Goodale Moir.

== Geography ==
Pāpaʻikou is located on the east side of the island of Hawaii at 19°47′38″N 155°5′48″W (19.794022, -155.096531). Hawaii Route 19 passes through the community, leading south 5 miles (8 km) to Hilo and northwest 37 miles (60 km) to Honokaa.

According to the United States Census Bureau, the Papaikou CDP has a total area of 1.9 square miles (4.9 km^{2}), of which 1.4 square miles (3.7 km^{2}) are land and 0.42 square miles (1.1 km^{2}), or 23.03%, are water. The CDP borders the Pacific Ocean from Hokeo Point in the north to Kekiwi Point in the south.

== Climate ==
Pāpaʻikou has a tropical rainforest climate (Af) with heavy rainfall year-round.

Climate data for Papaikou
Month	Jan	Feb	Mar	Apr	May	Jun	Jul	Aug	Sep	Oct	Nov	Dec	Year
Mean daily maximum °F (°C)	77.0 (25.0)	76.7 (24.8)	77.2 (25.1)	77.4 (25.2)	78.8 (26.0)	80.4 (26.9)	81.0 (27.2)	81.4 (27.4)	81.8 (27.7)	81.0 (27.2)	79.4 (26.3)	77.7 (25.4)	79.1 (26.2)
Daily mean °F (°C)	70.0 (21.1)	69.8 (21.0)	70.5 (21.4)	70.9 (21.6)	72.3 (22.4)	73.8 (23.2)	74.6 (23.7)	75.1 (23.9)	75.0 (23.9)	74.4 (23.6)	73.1 (22.8)	71.3 (21.8)	72.6 (22.5)
Mean daily minimum °F (°C)	63.1 (17.3)	62.9 (17.2)	63.9 (17.7)	64.5 (18.1)	65.8 (18.8)	67.3 (19.6)	68.2 (20.1)	68.8 (20.4)	68.3 (20.2)	67.9 (19.9)	66.8 (19.3)	64.9 (18.3)	66.0 (18.9)
Average precipitation inches (mm)	11.21 (285)	11.20 (284)	16.01 (407)	13.88 (353)	10.00 (254)	9.33 (237)	12.14 (308)	11.54 (293)	11.64 (296)	11.35 (288)	16.79 (426)	11.29 (287)	146.38 (3,718)
Source 1:
Source 2:

== Demographics ==
Historical population
Census	Pop.	Note	%±
2020	1,166		—
U.S. Decennial Census

At the 2000 census there were 1,414 people, 475 households, and 363 families in the CDP. The population density was 964.3 inhabitants per square mile (372.3/km^{2}). There were 502 housing units at an average density of 342.4 per square mile (132.2/km^{2}). The racial makeup of the CDP was 15.28% White, 0.50% African American, 0.07% Native American, 45.83% Asian, 9.41% Pacific Islander, 1.41% from other races, and 27.51% from two or more races. Hispanic or Latino of any race were 6.86%.

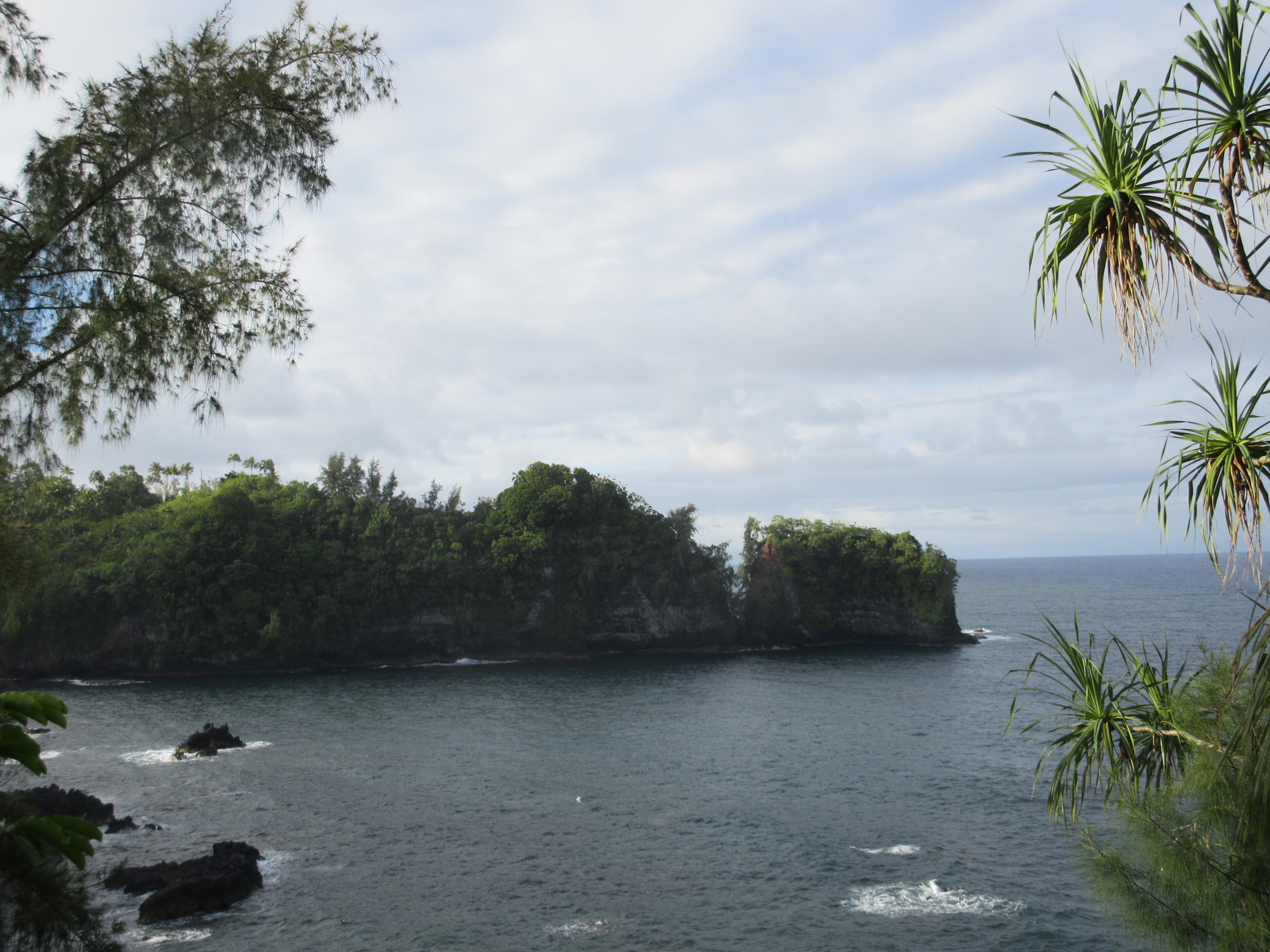
View of Onomea Bay from the scenic route through Papaikou and Pepeekeo, June 2011

Of the 475 households 29.5% had children under the age of 18 living with them, 52.8% were married couples living together, 14.7% had a female householder with no husband present, and 23.4% were non-families. 19.4% of households were one person and 10.7% were one person aged 65 or older. The average household size was 2.98 and the average family size was 3.35.

The age distribution was 24.2% under the age of 18, 7.8% from 18 to 24, 24.8% from 25 to 44, 23.2% from 45 to 64, and 20.1% 65 or older. The median age was 40 years. For every 100 females, there were 97.2 males. For every 100 females age 18 and over, there were 96.3 males.

The median household income was $37,031 and the median family income was $40,446. Males had a median income of $25,000 versus $24,205 for females. The per capita income for the CDP was $13,782. About 12.1% of families and 15.0% of the population were below the poverty line, including 18.0% of those under age 18 and 7.6% of those age 65 or over.

== Points of interest ==
- Hawaii Tropical Botanical Garden

== See also ==
- List of census-designated places in Hawaii
