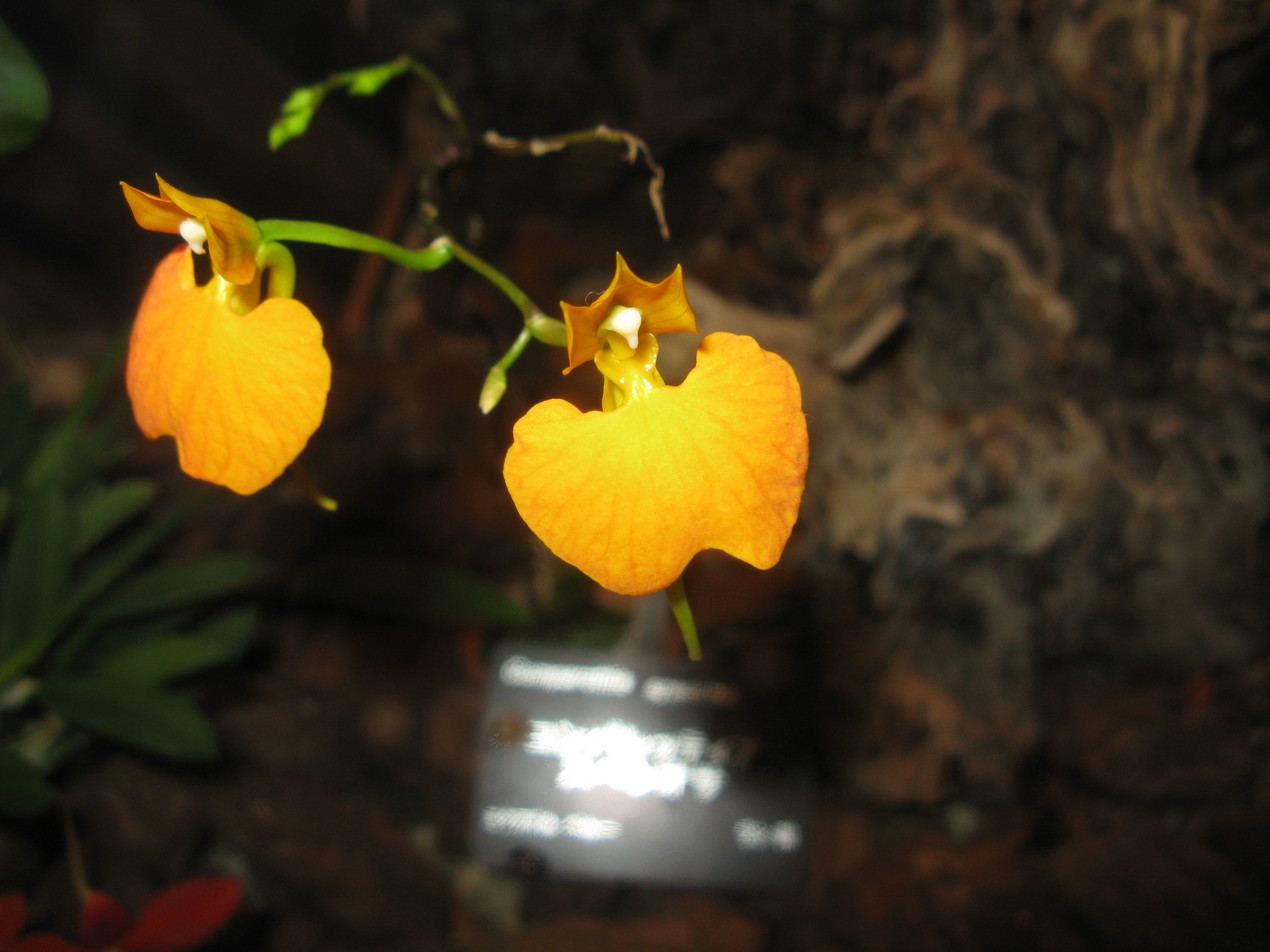

Scientific classification
- Kingdom: Plantae
- Clade: Tracheophytes
- Clade: Angiosperms
- Clade: Monocots
- Order: Asparagales
- Family: Orchidaceae
- Subfamily: Epidendroideae
- Genus: Comparettia
- Species: C. speciosa

Binomial name
- Comparettia speciosa Rchb.f. (1878)

= Comparettia speciosa =

Species of plant

Comparettia speciosa is an epiphytic species of orchid. It is native to Ecuador and Peru.
