= Hawaiian Sugar Planters' Association =

Nonprofit organization in Waipahu, Hawaii, US

The Hawaiian Sugar Planters' Association (HSPA) was an unincorporated, voluntary organization of sugarcane plantation owners in the Hawaiian Islands. It began as the Planters' Labor and Supply Company in 1882, later transforming into the HSPA in 1895. Its objective was to promote the mutual benefits of its members and the development of the sugar industry in the islands. Among the achievements of the association, the Hawaiian Sugar Planters' Association Experiment Station in Honolulu stood near the head of the list.

== History ==
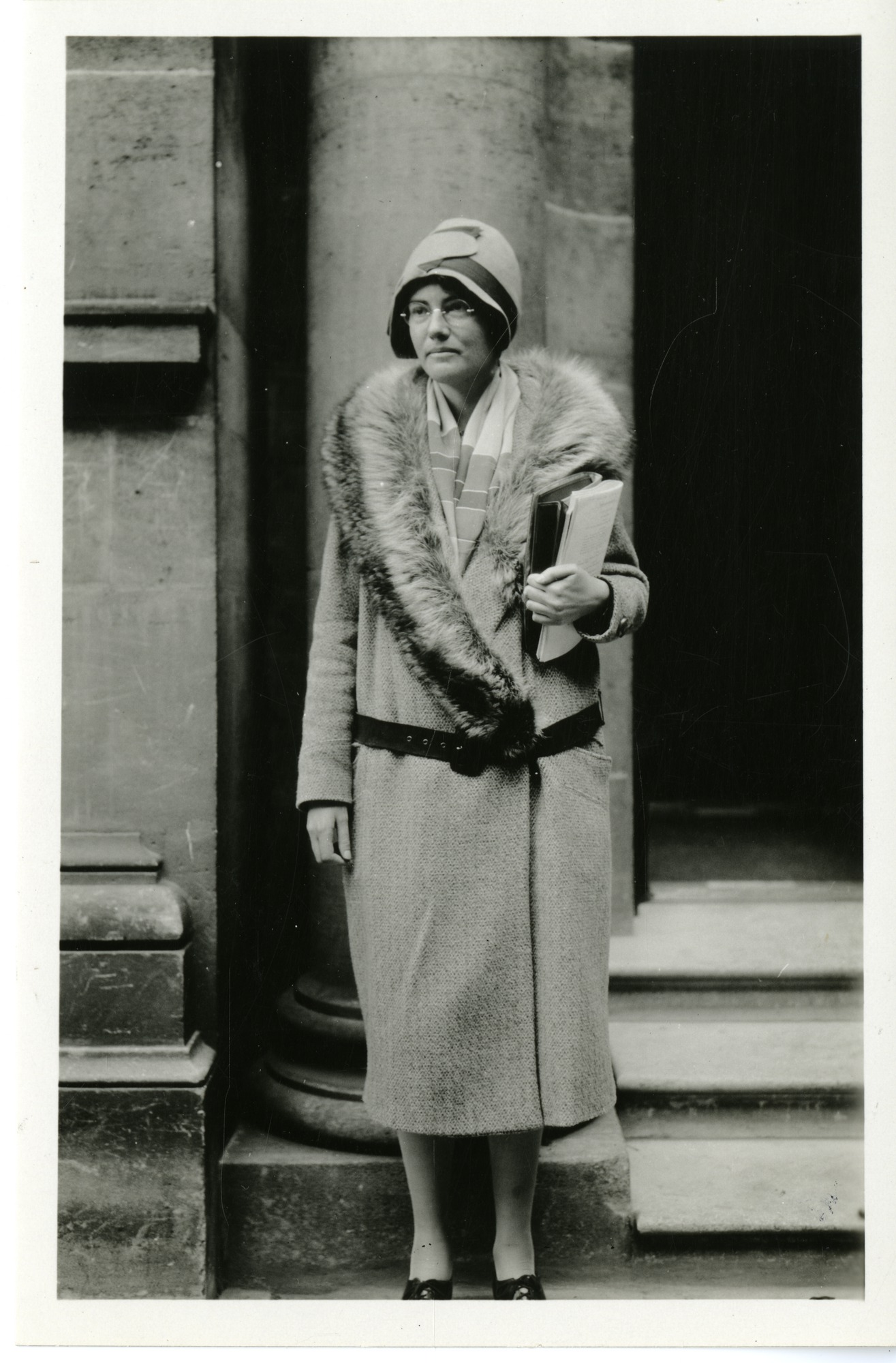
Constance Endicott Hartt, botanist on the staff of the HSPA

The Planters' Labor and Supply Company disincorporated in 1895, and the HSPA, a voluntary organization of persons and corporations interested in the sugar Industry, was formed. This association and its predecessor had for their objects and purposes the improvement of the sugar industry, the support of an experiment station, the maintenance of a sufficient supply of labor, and the development of agriculture in general. The activities of the organizations were along very much the same lines, enlarging and broadening as the industry they represented grew.

HSPA conducted scientific studies and gathered accurate records about the sugar industry through the established in the same year of the Hawaiian Sugar Planters' Association Experiment Station, located in Makiki, Honolulu. The HSPA practiced paternalistic management. Plantation owners introduced welfare programs, sometimes out of concern for the workers, but often designed to suit their economic ends. Threats, coercion, and "divide and rule" tactics were employed, particularly to keep the plantation workers ethnically segregated.

The HSPA also actively campaigned to bring workers to Hawaii. For instance, they opened offices on the islands of Luzon (Manila) and Vigan), and Cebu (Cebu City), to recruit Filipino workers and provide them free passage to Hawaii. Similarly, the HSPA became a powerful organization with tentacles reaching as far as Washington, D.C., where it successfully lobbied for legislation and labor and immigration policies beneficial to the sugar industry of Hawaii. On March 24, 1934, the U.S. Congress passed the Tydings–McDuffie Act (Philippine Independence Act), which reclassified all Filipinos living in the United States as aliens and restricted entry of laborers from the Philippines to 50 per year.

During the 1980s, competition from high-fructose corn syrup led to a significant decrease of cane production in Hawai, despite the Association's struggle to get protectionist legislation in the US.

A significant project undertaken by HSPA was to archive Hawaii's sugar company records. Between 1983 and 1994, archivists hired by HSPA received and processed records from dozens of sugar companies and related entities. The archival collection, now called the HSPA Plantation Archives, was donated to the University of Hawaii at Mānoa Library. The National Wildlife Research Center Archives also holds HSPA records in its collections.

== See also ==
- Hawaiian sugar strike of 1946
- William Whitmore Goodale Moir

== Sources ==
- Nakamura, Kelli Y. "Hawaiian Sugar Planters' Association," Densho Encyclopedia (26 February 2014).
