= Hawaiian Sugar Planters' Association Experiment Station =

US experimental agriculture station

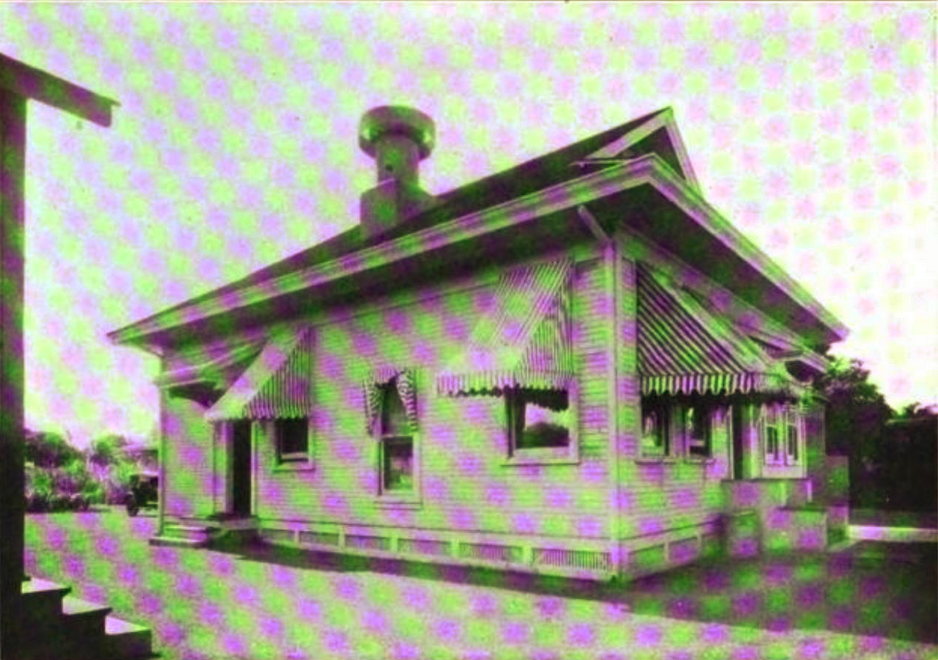
Plant Pathology building (1925)

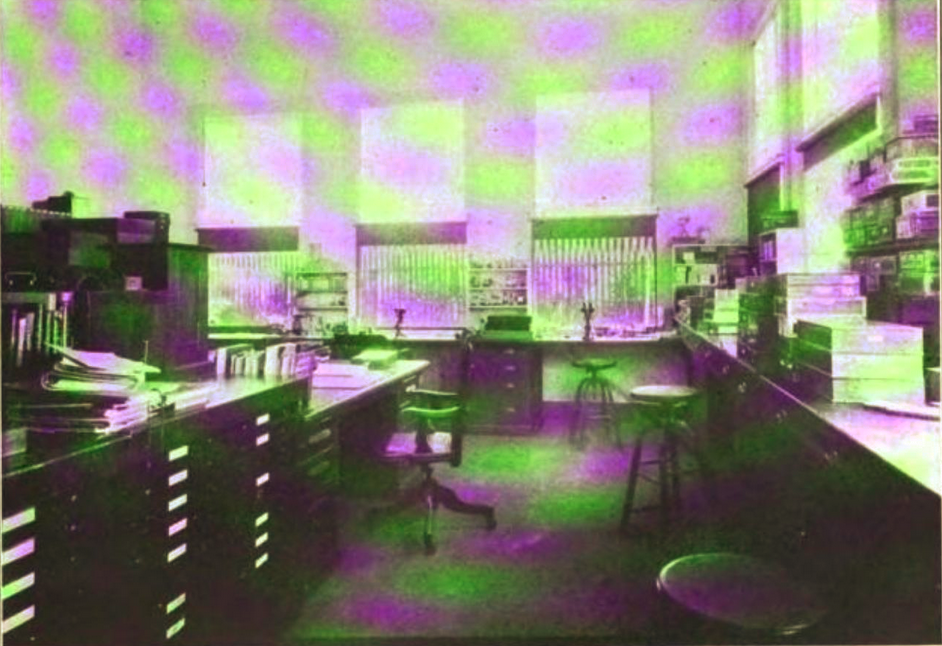
Entomological Dept laboratory room (1925)

The Hawaiian Sugar Planters' Association Experiment Station (also known as HSPA Experiment Station and Experiment Station of the Hawaiian Sugar Planters' Association; 1895–1996) was located in Makiki, Honolulu, Hawaiian Islands. It was established in 1895 by the Hawaiian Sugar Planters' Association (HSPA), an unincorporated, voluntary organization. With its establishment, there began a systematic examination of soils, together with the collection of data as to rainfall and temperature, which was the basis of much of the fertilizing that was done since that time. It was due in a very great measure to these investigations of the conditions of each plantation that the fertilizers used in one district were different from those used in another district, and that there was a constant tendency toward high-grade fertilizers which were specially prepared for the plantations where they were to be applied. In 1996, the HSPA Experiment Station became a part of the Hawaiian Agriculture Research Center (HARC).

== Establishment ==
The history of this Experiment Station dates from 1894, when the Planters' Labor and Supply Company determined to engage an experienced agricultural chemist to organize an experiment station and to act as a technical adviser to the plantation managers of the archipelago. The resolution made, it was necessary to find a man well qualified to the position. Advice was sought from an older established industry in Louisiana, where Dr. William Carter Stubbs, the doyen of sugar cane experimentalists, had already, for a decade, been conducting experiments at Audubon Park. The choice of Dr. Stubbs, fell upon Dr. Walter Maxwell, who even at that time had already achieved an enviable reputation as an agricultural chemist. Educated at the Zurich Polytechnic, Maxwell entered at an early age the service of the United States Department of Agriculture at Washington, D.C. and was detailed almost exclusively on sugar work. The two years previous to his arrival in the Hawaiian Islands had been spent in Louisiana in association with Dr. Stubbs; he was thus well fitted for the organization of, and pioneer work connected with, a new experiment station.

== Maxwell years ==
Maxwell's tensure lasted from 1895 to 1900, during which period time, he made an extensive soil survey of the Hawaiian islands. The results of this study were found in Lavas and Soils of the Hawaiian Islands. In addition, a detailed study of a number of cane varieties was made and much valuable information of a basic character on plant transpiration and the utilization of water in the production of cane crop was accumulated. Bulletin No. 90 of the Office of Experiment Stations in the United States Department of Agriculture, entitled "Irrigation in the Hawaiian Islands" contains in detailed form the results of Maxwell's studies in this direction.

== Early 20th-century ==
Maxwell left in 1900 to undertake a post under the Queensland Government, and was succeeded by R. E. Blouin, who, owing to ill health, only remained one year in the islands. Blouin was succeeded by C. F. Eckart, who had been associated with Maxwell from the early days of the station. Eckart's years of office were occupied in carrying to completion the irrigation and fertilization experiments along original lines to test established theories of cane fertilization in order to bring about, if need be, a modification of the general practices in vogue. The final results of this latter work, covering a period of nine years, yielded conclusions of exceptional value and formed a great part of the basis on which local fertilizer recommendations were made. Eckart conceived the idea of attempting to obtain by seminal variation, varieties of cane crop. In 1903, he set about seeking a variety which would surpass the Lahaina. Another phase of his activity was the organisation or sub-stations in various districts of the islands, whereby experiments were conducted on larger scale, and under conditions different from those prevailing at the experiment station in Honolulu. Also under Eckart, a system of fertilizer inspection and control was originated.

Originally the Experiment station was concerned only with agriculture in its restricted sense, but in the early years of the 20th century, it became apparent that economic entomologists and botanists were equally necessary to combat the insect and fungus pests of the field.

From 1904 to the latter part of 1909, the experiment station consisted of three divisions, of agriculture, of entomology and of plant pathology: each separate head and mutually Independent of each other. This arrangement was felt to be inconvenient in many way, and in 1909, it was decided to reorganize the station under one director, abolishing the offices of divisional directors, but in other respects, not in any way interrupting the continuity of the work. Accordingly, C. F. Eckart was made general director of the station. Many noteworthy achievements occurred with the reorganization of the HSPA Experiment Station in 1904. The greatest of these was the creation of a new system of agriculture built around the fat progeny of one tiny cane seedling, H109.

By 1913, the experience sugar experiment station had developed into an extensive establishment, housed in substantial and fully-equipped buildings possessing a large library and ample scientific apparatus, and employing a staff of between 20 and 30 scientists. Field experiments of various kinds were being conducted at the sub-station at Waipio, on the plantation of the Oahu Sugar Company, on a complete plantation scale, so that the results obtained from these experiments could be directly applied to general plantation conditions. At the Ewa Plantation Company's factory, a complete installation for carrying out the investigations and experiments in connection with the Battelle process were conducted. Apart from such routine work as sampling and testing fertilizers and soils, breeding and trying out new cane varieties, making efficiency tests in factories, reporting on diseased canes, arranging specimens, and so forth, the breeding of colonies of tachinid flies, and the distributing of them to those plantations which were infected with borer was continued by the station's entomologists. The rearing and distribution of colonies of the cane borer Tachinid was considered the most important entomological work of 1913. In chemistry and sugar technology, some extensive experiments were conducted. The agricultural experiments undertaken at the Waipio sub-station included: (a) irrigation tests, embracing a comparison of irrigations at 7-day, 14-day, 21-day, and 28-day intervals; (b) fertilizer tests, to deal with the question of when to apply dressings of nitrate of soda and of regular mixed fertilizer; (c) the best time of planting; (d) the use of molasses as a fertilizer; (e) the hilling of ratoons-to say nothing of tankage experiments, legume tests, variety tests, and. In addition to such experiments, an area was devoted to growing seed cane of the most promising seedlings and other varieties for distribution to the plantations.

== Later years ==
In 1982, there was a sub-station in Maunawili and another at Kunia. Sugar farmers with acreage ranging in size from 1 acre (0.40 ha) to 16,000 acres (6,500 ha) were being assisted.

In its later years, with downsizing of the industry and reduced financial support, the Hawaiian Sugar Planters' Association Experiment Station experienced cutbacks in activities and staff. On April 2, 1996, it became a part of HARC.

== Selected works ==
=== Bulletins ===
- Bulletin. Agricultural and chemical series. v.1-21(1905–1908), 1908
- Bulletin. Agricultural and chemical series. v.22-37(1908–1911), 1911
- Bulletin. Agricultural and chemical series. v.38-46(1912–1919), 1919
- Bulletin. Agricultural and chemical series. v.47-49(1923–1925), 1925
- Bulletin. Agricultural and chemical series. no. 1-55., no.1-19, 1945
- Bulletin. Agricultural and chemical series. no. 1-55., no.1-25 1905–08, 1945
- Bulletin. Agricultural and chemical series. no. 1-55., no.20-34, 1945
- Bulletin. Agricultural and chemical series. no. 1-55., no.26-46 1908–19, 1945
- Bulletin. Agricultural and chemical series. no. 1-55., no.35-46, 1945
- Bulletin. Agricultural and chemical series. no. 1-55., no.47-52, 1945
- Bulletin. Agricultural and chemical series. SPECIAL BULLETIN A, 1945
- Bulletin. Agricultural and chemical series. SPECIAL BULLETIN B, 1945
- Bulletin. Botanical series, no.1-5 co.1 1905–06, 1906
- Bulletin. Botanical series, no.1-8 co.2 1905–08, 1908
- Bulletin. Botanical series, no.1-10 (1905–10), 1910
- Bulletin. Botanical series, no.11-12 (1910–12), 1912
- Bulletin. Botanical series, no.6-12 1908–12, 1912
- Bulletin. Botanical series, v.1 1905-v.2 1919 [incomplete], 1912
- Bulletin. Botanical series, v.3 pt.2, 1924
- Bulletin. Botanical series, v.3 (1921–24), 1924
- Bulletin. Botanical series, v.3 1921–24, 1924
- Bulletin. Entomological series, no.1, May 1906
- Bulletin. Entomological series, no.2-8 (Nov 1906–1909) (includes Cum. Index no.2-5), 1909
- Bulletin. Entomological series, no.6-13(1909–1916), 1916
- Bulletin. Entomological series, no.9-14 (1910–19) (includes Cum. Index no.6-13), 1919
- Bulletin. Entomological series, no.3, 1921

=== Reports ===
- Report of the Experiment Station Committee, 1903/04-1904/05, 1904
- Report of the Experiment Station Committee, 1904–05, 1905
- Report of the Experiment Station Committee, 1905/06, 1906
- Report of the Experiment Station Committee, 1906/07, 1907
- Report of the Experiment Station Committee, 1907/08, 1908
- Report of the Experiment Station Committee, 1908/09, 1909
- Report of the Experiment Station Committee, 1909/10-1910/11, 1910
- Report of the Experiment Station Committee, 1911/12-1912/13, 1912
- Report of the Experiment Station Committee, 1913/14-1915/16, 1915
- Report of the Experiment Station Committee, 1917/18, 1918
- Report of the Experiment Station Committee, 1922–1923, 1923
- Report of the Experiment Station Committee, 1922/23-1924/25, 1924
- Report of the Experiment Station Committee, 1925/26-1927/28, 1927
- Report of work of the Experiment Station of the Hawaiian Sugar Planters' Association. Division of Entomology bulletin, no.1, 1903
- Report of work of the Experiment Station of the Hawaiian Sugar Planters' Association. Division of Entomology bulletin, no.1, 1906
- Report of work of the Experiment Station of the Hawaiian Sugar Planters' Association. Division of Entomology bulletin, no.1-3 1906–07, 1907
- Report of work of the Experiment Station of the Hawaiian Sugar Planters' Association. Division of Entomology bulletin, no.2-5 1906–1907, 1907
- Report of work of the Experiment Station of the Hawaiian Sugar Planters' Association. Division of Entomology bulletin, no.1, 1909
- Report of work of the Experiment Station of the Hawaiian Sugar Planters' Association. Division of Entomology bulletin, no.4, 1918
- Report of work of the Experiment Station of the Hawaiian Sugar Planters' Association. Entomological series bulletin, no.4-14 1907–1919, 1919

=== Other ===
- Work of the Hawaiian Experiment Station, 1899–1901, 1901
- Work of the Experiment Station and Laboratories of the Hawaiian Sugar Planters' Association, 1902
- The relation of applied science to sugar production in Hawaii, 1915
- The improvement of sugar cane through bud selection [1922]-1924, v.1, 1925
- Circular, no. 41-51 (1924–28), 1928
- Circular, no.44 1925-no.60, 1932
- The reorganization of the H. S. P. A. experiment station and the origin of H-109 cane, 1932

== Gallery ==
The relation of applied science to sugar production in Hawaii

The improvement of plants through bud selection

Lavas and soils of the Hawaiian Islands. Investigations of the Hawaiian experiment station and laboratories

Report of forestry committee
