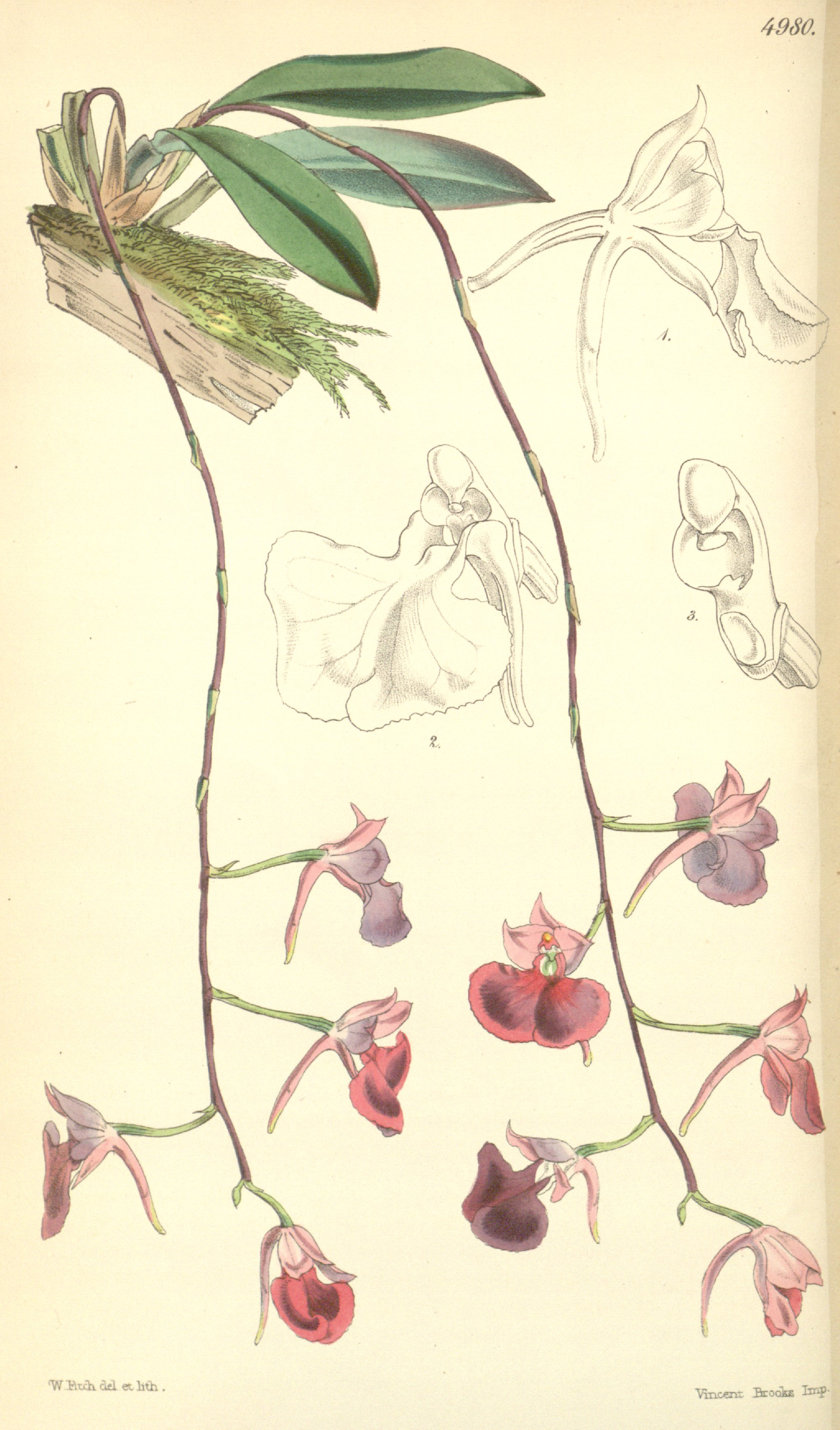
- 1857 illustration from Curtis's Botanical Magazine

Scientific classification
- Kingdom: Plantae
- Clade: Tracheophytes
- Clade: Angiosperms
- Clade: Monocots
- Order: Asparagales
- Family: Orchidaceae
- Subfamily: Epidendroideae
- Genus: Comparettia
- Species: C. falcata

Binomial name
- Comparettia falcata Poepp. & Endl. (1836)

= Comparettia falcata =

Species of orchid

Comparettia falcata is an epiphytic species of orchid. It is the type species of the genus Comparettia. It is widespread across much of the warmer parts of the Western Hemisphere: Mexico, Belize, Central America, the West Indies and South America.
