= Paraphalaenopsis labukensis =

Scientific classification
- Kingdom: Plantae
- Clade: Tracheophytes
- Clade: Angiosperms
- Clade: Monocots
- Order: Asparagales
- Family: Orchidaceae
- Subfamily: Epidendroideae
- Genus: Paraphalaenopsis
- Species: P. labukensis

Binomial name
- Paraphalaenopsis labukensis Shim, A.L.Lamb & C.L.Chan

Species of orchid

Paraphalaenopsis labukensis is an orchid (family Orchidaceae) commonly called the rat-tailed orchid and native to Borneo. It is most notable for its very long narrow leaves; in the wild they reach 1.2 m (4 ft) long, while in cultivation they may grow longer than 2 m (6.5 ft).
