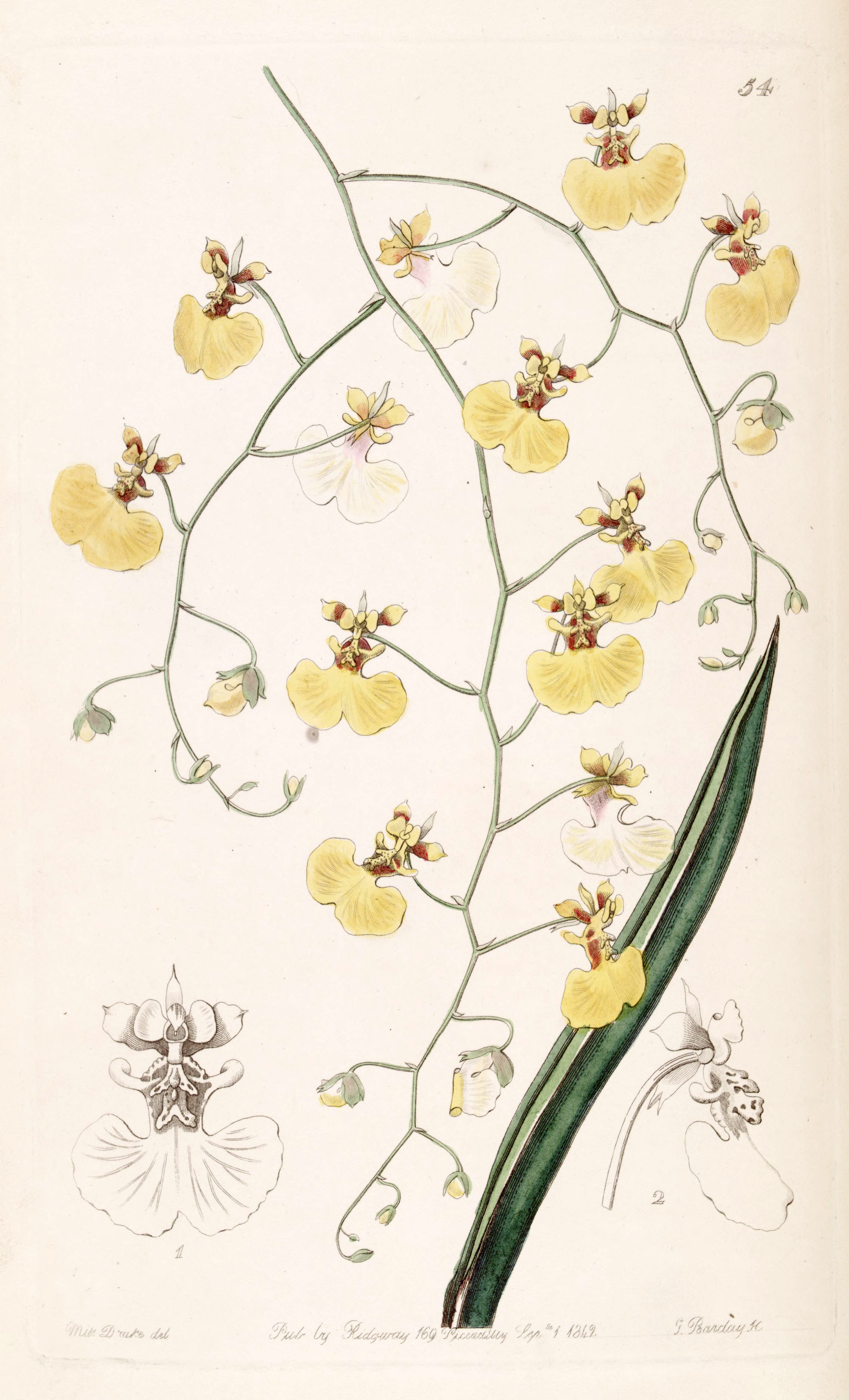
- Illustration of Tolumnia urophylla

Scientific classification
- Kingdom: Plantae
- Clade: Tracheophytes
- Clade: Angiosperms
- Clade: Monocots
- Order: Asparagales
- Family: Orchidaceae
- Subfamily: Epidendroideae
- Genus: Tolumnia
- Species: T. urophylla

Binomial name
- Tolumnia urophylla (Lodd. ex Lindl.) Braem

Synonyms
- Oncidium urophyllum Lodd. ex Lindl. (basionym); Oncidium urophyllum f. flavum R.J.Midgett

= Tolumnia urophylla =

Species of orchid

Tolumnia urophylla is a species of orchid native to the Lesser Antilles.
