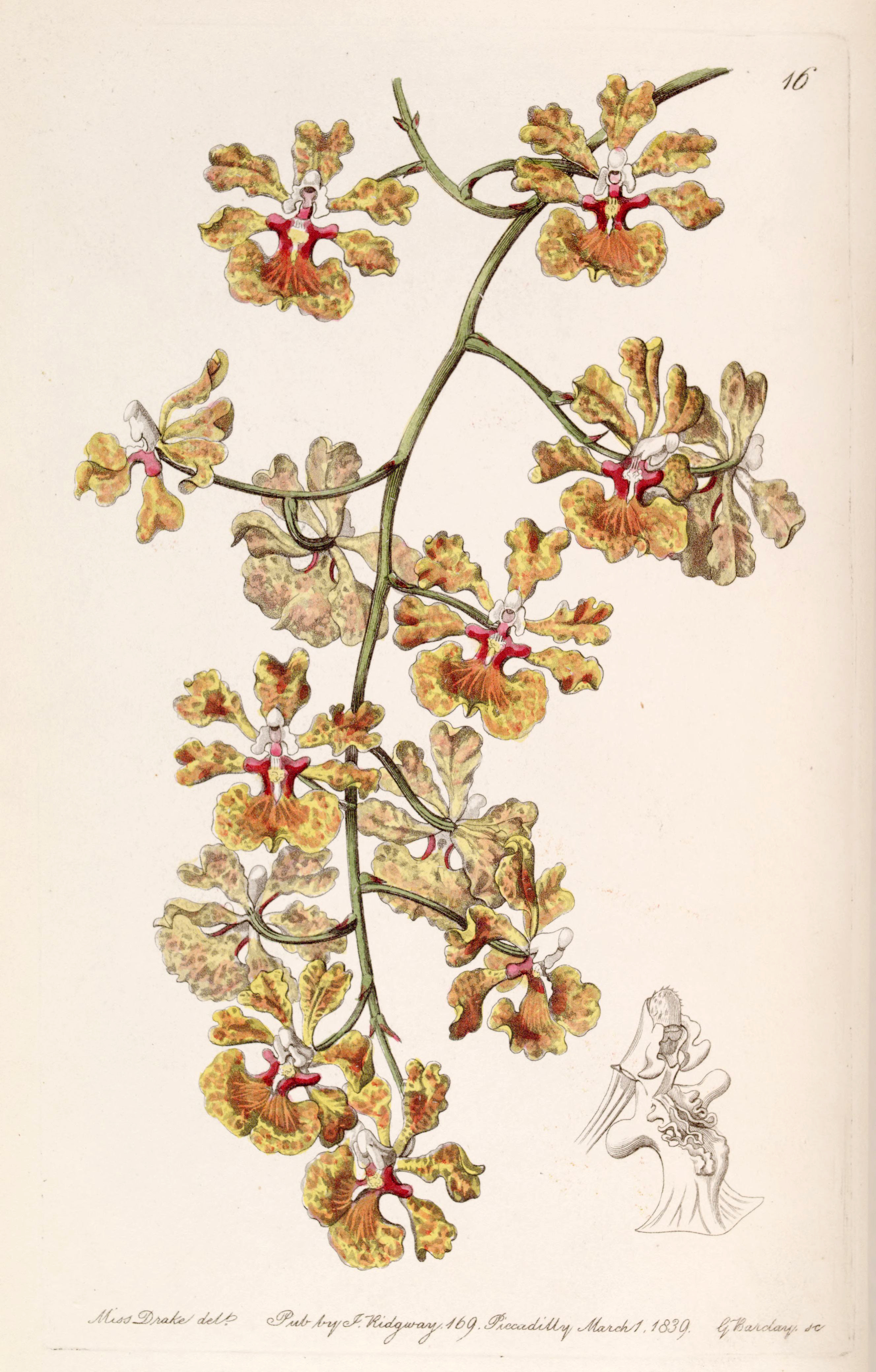
- Tolumnia guttata flowers

Scientific classification
- Kingdom: Plantae
- Clade: Tracheophytes
- Clade: Angiosperms
- Clade: Monocots
- Order: Asparagales
- Family: Orchidaceae
- Subfamily: Epidendroideae
- Genus: Tolumnia
- Species: T. guttata

Binomial name
- Tolumnia guttata (L.) Nir

Synonyms
- Epidendrum guttatum L. (basionym); Cymbidium guttatum (L.) Willd.; Cymbidium tetrapetalum (Jacq.) Sw.; Epidendrum acinaciforme Pav. ex Lindl.; Epidendrum tetrapetalum Jacq.; Oncidium apiculatum Moir; Oncidium berenyce Rchb.f.; Oncidium boydii Lindl.; Oncidium cuneatum Lindl.; Oncidium cuneilabium Moir; Oncidium guttatum (L.) Rchb.f.; Oncidium guttatum var. auriculatum Cogn; Oncidium guttatum var. dodgsonii Cogn.; Oncidium intermedium Knowles & Westc.; Oncidium luridum var. guttatum (L.) Lindl.; Oncidium pauciflorum Lindl.; Oncidium pulchellum f. apiculatum (Moir) Withner; Oncidium pulchellum f. berenyce (Rchb.f.) Withner; Oncidium pulchellum f. cuneilabium (Moir) Withner; Oncidium quadripetalum Sw.; Oncidium tetrapetalum (Jacq.) Willd.; Oncidium tricolor Hook.; Tolumnia apiculata (Moir) Braem; Tolumnia berenyce (Rchb.f.) Braem; Tolumnia cuneilabia (Moir) Braem; Tolumnia tetrapetala (Jacq.) Braem; Xaritonia elegans Raf.

= Tolumnia guttata =

Species of orchid

Tolumnia guttata is a species of orchid found from Mexico, Belize to Colombia and the Caribbean.
