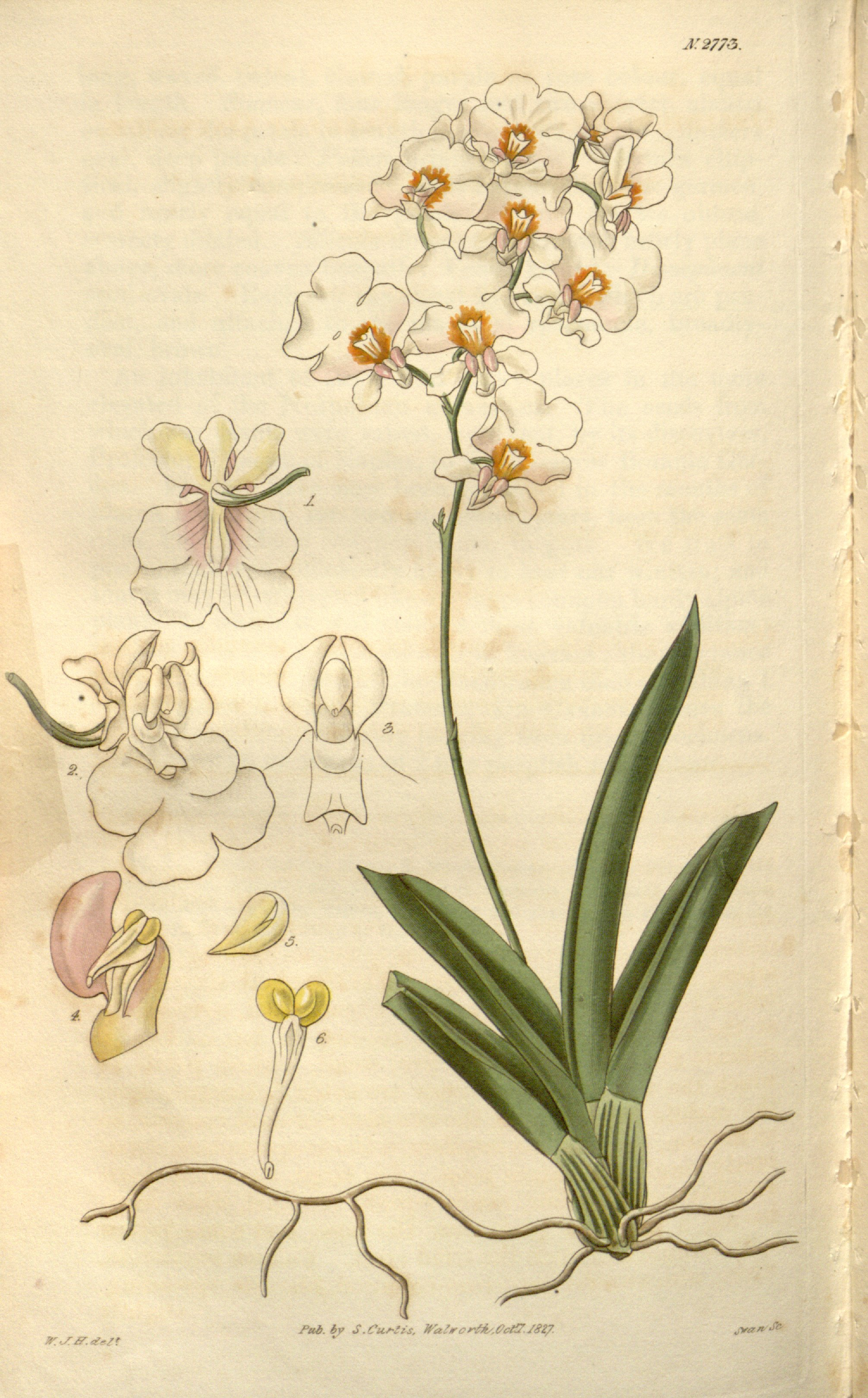

Scientific classification
- Kingdom: Plantae
- Clade: Tracheophytes
- Clade: Angiosperms
- Clade: Monocots
- Order: Asparagales
- Family: Orchidaceae
- Subfamily: Epidendroideae
- Genus: Tolumnia
- Species: T. pulchella

Binomial name
- Tolumnia pulchella (Hook.) Raf.

Synonyms
- Oncidium pulchellum Hook. (basionym); Oncidium jamaicense Moir & A.D.Hawkes; Oncidium sanctae-anae Moir & A.D.Hawkes; Oncidium withneranum Moir; Oncidium hartii Moir; Oncidium concavum Moir; Oncidium pulchellum f. concavum (Moir) Withner; Oncidium pulchellum f. hartii (Moir) Withner; Oncidium pulchellum f. jamaicense (Moir & A.D.Hawkes) Withner; Oncidium pulchellum f. sanctae-anae (Moir & A.D.Hawkes) Withner; Oncidium pulchellum f. withneranum (Moir) Withner; Oncidium pulchellum subsp. concavum (Moir) Braem; Tolumnia concava (Moir) Braem

= Tolumnia pulchella =

Species of orchid

Tolumnia pulchella is a hybrid species of orchid native to Jamaica. It is the type species of the genus Tolumnia.
