= Comparettia newyorkorum =

Scientific classification
- Kingdom: Plantae
- Clade: Embryophytes
- Clade: Tracheophytes
- Clade: Angiosperms
- Clade: Monocots
- Order: Asparagales
- Family: Orchidaceae
- Subfamily: Epidendroideae
- Genus: Comparettia
- Species: C. newyorkorum

Binomial name
- Comparettia newyorkorum (R.Vásquez, Ibisch & I.G.Vargas) M.W.Chase & N.H.Williams

Synonyms
- Scelochilus newyorkorum R.Vásquez, Ibisch & I.G.Vargas

Species of flowering plant

Comparettia newyorkorum is a species of orchid (family Orchidaceae) in the tribe Cymbidieae, native to Bolivia. It is a non-woody epiphyte.
