= Kunia Camp, Hawaii =

Unincorporated community in Hawaii, United States

Kunia Camp
- Unincorporated community
- Location within the state of Hawaii
- Coordinates: 21°27′48″N 158°3′55″W
- Country: United States
- State: Hawaii
- County: Honolulu
- Elevation: 883 ft (269 m)
- Time zone: UTC−10 (Hawaii–Aleutian)
- ZIP codes: 96759
- GNIS feature ID: 365354

Kunia Camp (also called Kunia) is an unincorporated community on the island of Oahu in Honolulu County, Hawaii, United States. It lies along Hawaii Route 750 northwest of downtown Honolulu, the county seat of Honolulu County. Its elevation is 883 feet (269 m). It has a post office (under the name of Kunia), with the ZIP code of 96759.

== Government and infrastructure ==
The community was a plantation village for a Del Monte pineapple plantation. The plantation closed in 2006; two years later, the community's land was given to the Hawaiian Agriculture Research Center, allowing its residents to keep their leases. The community was added to the National Register of Historic Places in 2014.

In March 2019, the Public Utilities Commission (PUC) approved 174 Power Global to build a 52 megawatt with 208 megawatt-hour storage solar farm plus battery storage project on a 352-acre site owned by Robinson Kunia Land LLC at Kunia called Hoʻohana Solar 1. HECO will buy electricity from this solar-plus-storage project at 10 cents per kilowatt-hour (kWh). According to PUC filings, FCHQC Development, a joint venture between Forest City Sustainable Resources and 174 Power Group, owns 174 Power Group and has Larry Greene as the project manager of Hoʻohana Solar 1. As of March, 2019, this project is in prime agricultural zone A land, does not have a permit for construction, and faces stiff opposition from the Hawaii Farm Bureau, the Hawaii Sierra Club, the state of Hawaii's Office of Planning, and the Hawaii State's Department of Agriculture. Dean Okimoto and Richard Ha, two farmers who recently stopped their crop operations, said that better partnerships with farmers will allow farmers to cohabit the land so that farming melded with renewable-energy projects can boost the agricultural land's financial sustainability.
