= May A. Moir =

American orchid breeder, botanical collector (1907–2001)

May Arstad Moir
- Born: May Margaret Arstad; December 4, 1907; Honolulu, Territory of Hawaii
- Died: September 9, 2001 (aged 93)
- Other names: May Arstad Neal, May Arstad Neal Moir
- Education: Punahou School
- Occupations: Floral designer, gardener, horticulturist, orchid breeder, writer, botanical collector
- Spouse(s): Charles Micajah Neal Jr. (m. 1928–1949; his death), William Whitmore Goodale Moir (m. 1950–1985; his death)
- Children: 1
- Awards: Living Treasures of Hawai'i (1985)

May Arstad Moir (née May Margaret Arstad; 1907–2001) was an American floral designer, gardener, horticulturist, orchid breeder, writer, and botanical collector in Hawaii. She was awarded the title of one of the "Living Treasures of Hawai'i" (1985). She was also known as May Arstad Neal, and May Arstad Neal Moir.

== Life and career ==
May Margaret Arstad was born on December 4, 1907, at Kap'iolani Maternity Home in Honolulu, Territory of Hawaii, and she was raised in Kaimuki. She graduated from Punahou School.

In 1928, she married Charles Micajah Neal Jr., and together they had a daughter. She briefly worked with Charles in real estate. Her first husband died in 1949, and a year later she re-married her friend William Whitmore Goodale Moir.

Moir and her husband William were known for their extensive gardens at their Dowsett Highlands home in Honolulu, which is registered with the Smithsonian Institution.

She was the namesake of some 6 or more orchid species, of which was a Dendrobium named D. "May Neal, and a Miltonia named Miltonia May Moir, both bred and named by her second husband. In the 1980s she was a volunteer in the gardens at Chinese Court in the Honolulu Academy of Arts (now the Honolulu Museum of Art). In 1984, Moir was featured on episode 325 of Spectrum Hawai‘i, a television show on PBS Hawai‘i. She was named in 1985 as one of the "Living Treasures of Hawai'i" by the Buddhist temple Honpa Hongwanji Mission of Hawaii.

== Publications ==
- Moir, W. W. G. (William Whitmore Goodale); Moir, May A. (1970). Variegata Oncidiums. Orchids Limited.
- Moir, May A. (1977). Flower Sculpture: A Handbook. Ku Pa'a Publishing. ISBN 9780914916253.
- Moir, W. W. Goodale (William Whitmore Goodale); Moir, May A. (1980). Breeding Variegata Oncidiums. University Press of Hawaii, Harold L. Lyon Arboretum. ISBN 082480712X.
- Moir, William W. G.; Moir, May A. (1982). Creating Oncidiinae Intergenerics. University Press of Hawaii, Harold L. Lyon Arboretum. ISBN 9780824807849.
- Moir, May A. (1983). The Garden Watcher. University of Hawaii Press, Harold L. Lyon Arboretum. ISBN 9780824807894.

== See also ==
- List of Living Treasures of Hawaii
