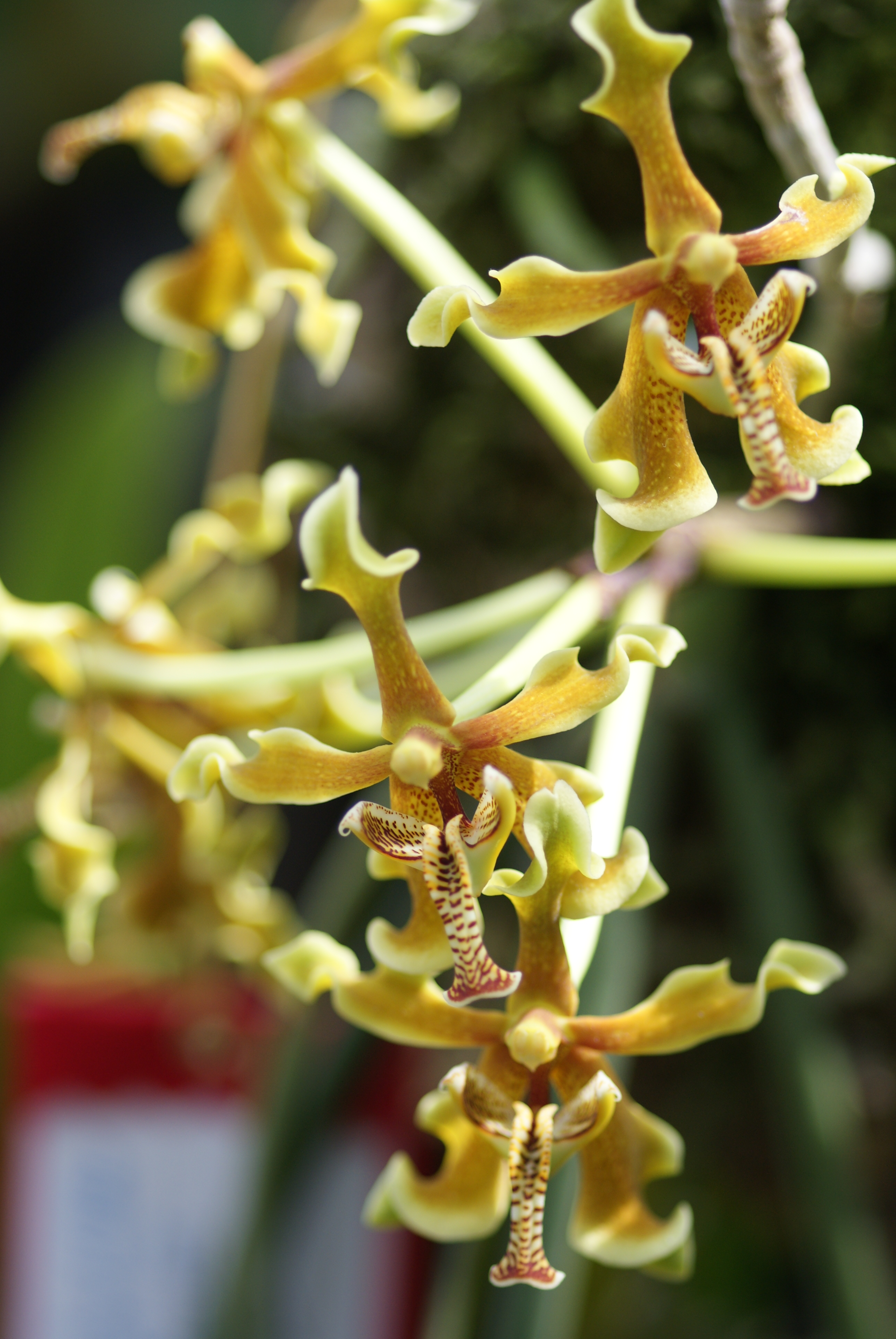
- Paraphalaenopsis labukensis

Scientific classification
- Kingdom: Plantae
- Clade: Tracheophytes
- Clade: Angiosperms
- Clade: Monocots
- Order: Asparagales
- Family: Orchidaceae
- Subfamily: Epidendroideae
- Tribe: Vandeae
- Subtribe: Aeridinae
- Genus: Paraphalaenopsis; A.D.Hawkes, 1963

Type species
- Paraphalaenopsis denevei

Species
- Paraphalaenopsis denevei; Paraphalaenopsis labukensis; Paraphalaenopsis laycockii; Paraphalaenopsis serpentilingua

= Paraphalaenopsis =

Genus of orchids

The genus Paraphalaenopsis, abbreviated as Prphln in horticultural trade, is a member of the orchid family (Orchidaceae), consisting of 4 species endemic to Borneo and one natural (unconfirmed) hybrid, Paraphalaenopsis × thorntonii (P. denevei × P. serpentilingua). Named by American botanist Alex Drum Hawkes.

They are morphologically similar to Phalaenopsis and were a long time considered as species of that genus. Their flowers are similar, but the leaves of Paraphalaenopsis are cylindrical and long (from 35 cm up to 3m in cultivation). This latter measurement belongs to the "rat-tail orchid" (P. labukensis) with a maximum length of 3.05 meters (ten feet); the greatest length of any orchid leaf. These leaves resemble the leaves of the Holcoglossum. These are epiphytes that bloom in early spring.

== Species ==
Image	Name	Distribution	Elevation in meters (m)
	Paraphalaenopsis denevei A.D.Hawkes (1963)	western Borneo	300 m
	Paraphalaenopsis labukensis Shim, A.L.Lamb & C.L.Chan (1981)	Sabah Borneo	500 – 1000 m
	Paraphalaenopsis laycockii (M.R.Hend.) A.D.Hawkes (1963)	central and south Borneo	
	Paraphalaenopsis serpentilingua (J.J.Sm.) A.D.Hawkes (1963)	Borneo	0– 1000 m
