= Hawaiian Agriculture Research Center =

Amercian nonprofit organization

Hawaii Agriculture Research Center (HARC) is an American non-profit 501(c)(3) organization based in Kunia, Hawaii. Originally established in 1895, and changed the name to HARC in 1996, it took over the operations of the Hawaiian Sugar Planters' Association Experiment Station and increased the scope of services beyond sugarcane. The funding allocated by the United States Senate Committee on Appropriations is used to maintain the competitiveness of U.S. sugarcane producers and to place increased emphasis supporting the expansion of new crops and products to complement sugarcane production. HARC provides research services to a wide range of participants in Hawaii's agricultural sector, and not just the sugar industry. HARC is supported by the State of Hawaii, the sugar industry, and other agricultural interests in coffee, pineapple, and other crops.
