= John Wright (doctor) =

- Born: February 11, 1811; Troy, New York, U.S.
- Died: April 11, 1846 (aged 35); Aiken, South Carolina, U.S.
- Education: Yale
- Known for: Botany; Medicine
- Spouse: Mary Cottrell (m. 1838; died 1841) Catherine Wyant (m. 1844)
- Scientific career
- Fields: Medicine; Botany
- Workplaces: Rensselaer Polytechnic Institute; Rensselaer County Medical Society; Troy Lyceum of Natural History
- Author abbrev. (botany): Wright

John Wright (February 2, 1811 – April 11, 1846) was an American medical doctor and botanist.

Wright was Amos Eaton's student and co-authored the last, eighth, edition of the Manual of Botany. He had one son, with Mary Cottrell, who died on September 18, 1841. In 1833, he graduated with a medical degree from Yale College. He went on to be a professor at the Rensselaer Polytechnic Institute and a lecturer for the Rensselaer County Medical Society. For two years he associated in practice with Thomas C. Brinsmade. The standard author abbreviation Wright is used to indicate this person as the author when citing a botanical name.
