= William Whitmore Goodale Moir =

American botanist (1896–1985)

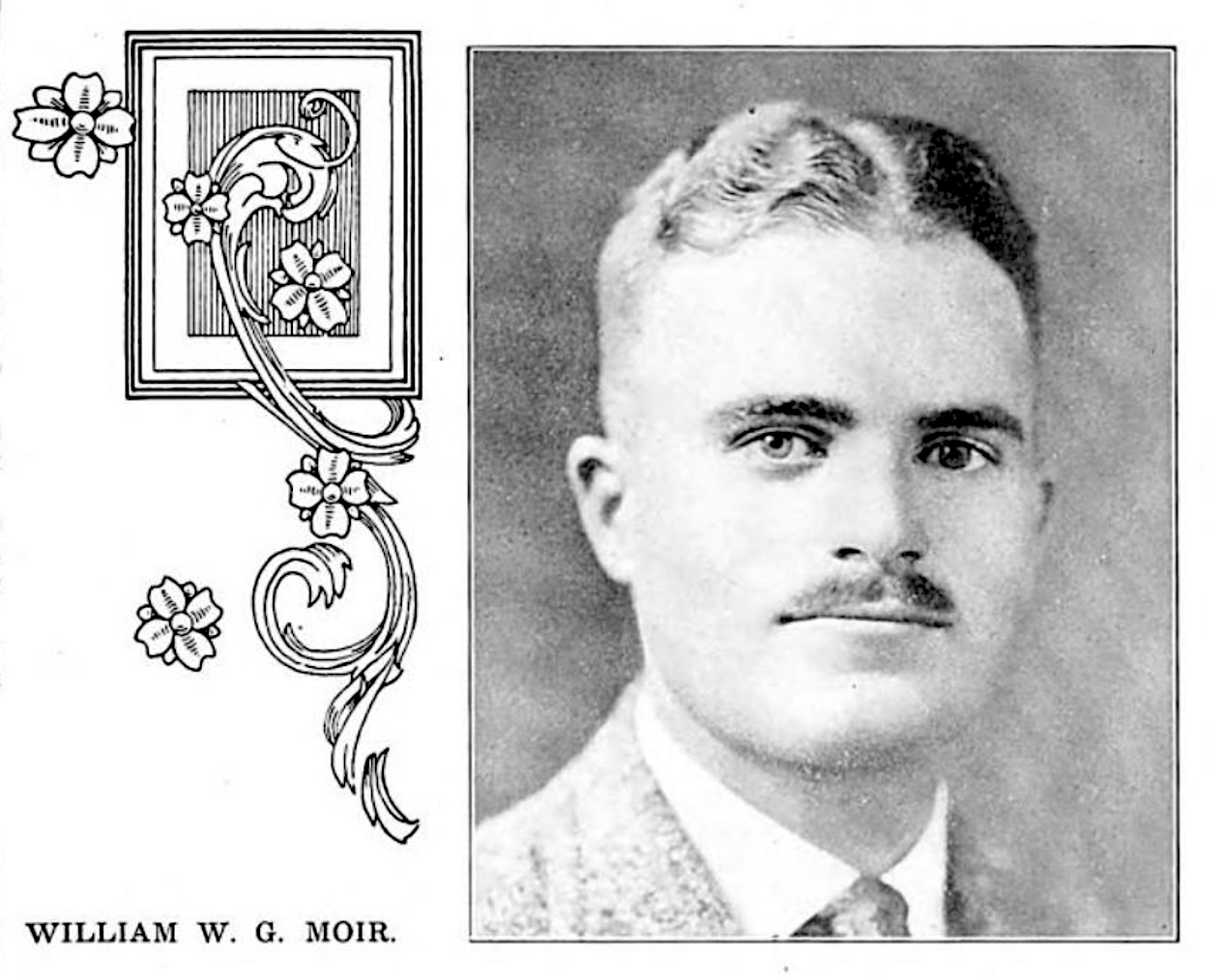
- Moir, c. 1925
- Born: March 17, 1896; Pāpaʻikou, Territory of Hawaii
- Died: February 21, 1985 (aged 88); Hawaii, United States
- Other names: William W. G. Moir, W. W. G. Moir, William Whitmore Goodale-Moir
- Education: Punahou School; Cornell University (BS)
- Occupations: Botanist, agricultural technologist
- Spouse(s): Elenor Gilchrist Preston; May Margaret Arstad (m. 1950–1985; his death)

William Whitmore Goodale Moir, also known as W. W. G. Moir (1896–1985) was an American botanist and agricultural technologist, who specialized in orchid taxonomy and was a sugar cane argonomist. He worked as an agricultural technologist for American Factors Ltd. (later known as AMFAC).

== Life and career ==
William Whitmore Goodale Moir was born on March 17, 1896, in Pāpaʻikou, Territory of Hawaii. His mother was Louisa (née Silver) and; his father was John Troup Moir Sr., a Hawaiian sugar plantation manager at Onomea Sugar Company in Pāpaʻikou. He attended high school at Punahou School in Honolulu, in the class of 1910.

During World War I, Moir served as a lieutenant in the United States Army at Camp Hancock in Georgia. Moir graduated from Cornell University (B.S. 1919) in Ithaca, New York, where he studied agriculture.

Moir returned to Hawaii after college, and worked as an assistant agriculturist at the Experiment Station at the Hawaiian Sugar Planters' Association. In 1923, Moir was the harvest overseer at Pioneer Mill Company, and resigned from the role in 1925 to become the agricultural technologist for American Factors Ltd. (or AMFAC). In 1928, he spoke about the use of molasses as a fertilizer at the Hawaiian Sugar Planters' Association meeting. He remained working at AMFAC until 1957.

Moir and his wife were known for their extensive gardens at their Dowsett Highlands home in Honolulu, which is registered with the Smithsonian Institution. He developed more than 65 new hybrid orchids. He was a member of Hawaiian Botanical Society, the Hawaiian Sugar Technologists, and the International Society of Sugar Cane Technologists. Moir served as president of the Hawaiian Botanical Gardens Foundation, and as a trustee and trustee emeritus of the Pacific Tropical Botanical Gardens.

A dendrobium orchid, D. "May Neal," was bred by Moir and named after his second wife May A. Moir.

He died on February 21, 1985, in Hawaii.

== Publications ==
- Moir, W. W. G. (William Whitmore Goodale); Allen, Oscar Nelson; Association of Hawaiian Sugar Technologists (1936). A Handbook on Hawaiian Soils. Association of Hawaiian Sugar Technologists.
- Moir, W. W. G. (William Whitmore Goodale); Moir, May A. (1970). Variegata Oncidiums. Orchids Limited.
- Moir, W. W. Goodale; Moir, May A. (1980). Breeding Variegata Oncidiums. University Press of Hawaii, Harold L. Lyon Arboretum. ISBN 082480712X.
- Moir, William W. G.; Moir, May A. (1982). Creating Oncidiinae Intergenerics. University Press of Hawaii, Harold L. Lyon Arboretum. ISBN 9780824807849.
