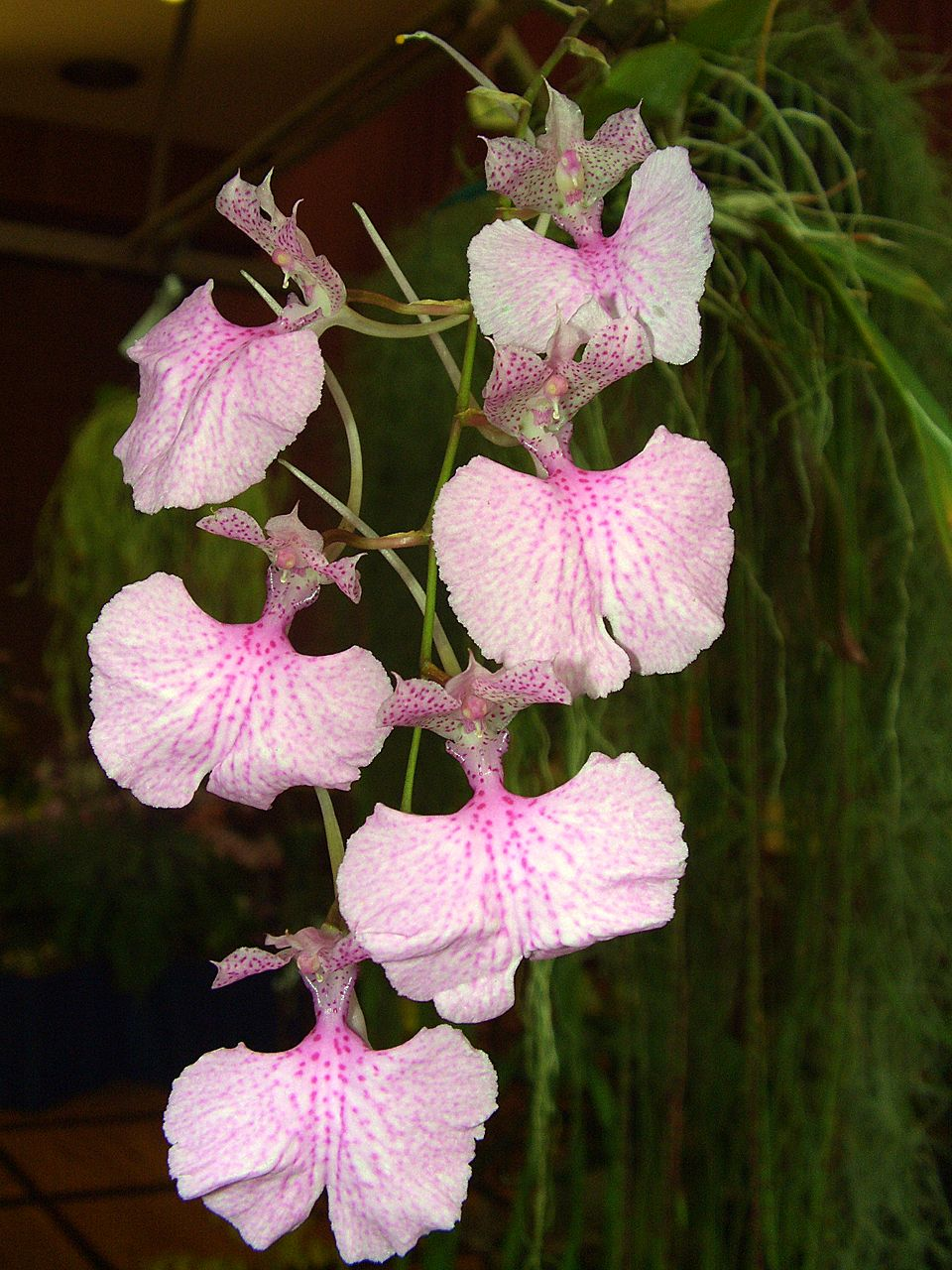
- Comparettia macroplectron

Scientific classification
- Kingdom: Plantae
- Clade: Tracheophytes
- Clade: Angiosperms
- Clade: Monocots
- Order: Asparagales
- Family: Orchidaceae
- Subfamily: Epidendroideae
- Tribe: Cymbidieae
- Subtribe: Oncidiinae
- Genus: Comparettia; Lindl.

Type species
- Comparettia falcata Poepp. et Endl.

Synonyms
- Diadenium Poepp. & Endl; Chaenanthe Lindl.; Scelochilus Klotzsch; Neokoehleria Schltr.; Scelochiloides Dodson & M.W.Chase; Stigmatorthos M.W.Chase & D.E.Benn; Pfitzeria Senghas; Scelochilopsis Dodson & M.W.Chase

= Comparettia =

Genus of orchids

Comparettia, abbreviated Comp in the horticultural trade, is a genus of orchids. It consists about 50-70 species, native to tropical America. They occur in Mexico, Central America, the West Indies, and in northern South America as far south as Brazil and Bolivia, although they are particularly common in the Andes. The genus has grown markedly in recent years due to many species being transferred from other genera.

== Species ==
As of November 2024, Plants of the World Online accepted the following species:

Image	Scientific name	Distribution	Elevation (m)
	Comparettia acebeyae (R.Vásquez & Dodson) M.W.Chase & N.H.Williams	Bolivia (La Paz)	1,750 metres (5,740 ft)
	Comparettia alexii (Szlach., Kolan. & Oledrz.) J.M.H.Shaw	Ecuador	
	Comparettia amboroensis (R.Vásquez & Dodson) M.W.Chase & N.H.Williams	Bolivia	
	Comparettia auriculata (Rchb.f.) M.W.Chase & N.H.Williams	Ecuador	
	Comparettia barkeri (Lindl.) M.W.Chase & N.H.Williams	Venezuela, Ecuador, Peru and Brazil	1,000 metres (3,300 ft)
	Comparettia bennettii M.W.Chase & N.H.Williams	Ecuador, Bolivia	
	Comparettia bigibbosa (Königer) J.M.H.Shaw	Ecuador (Pichincha)	
	Comparettia blankei (Senghas) M.W.Chase & N.H.Williams	Colombia	
	Comparettia brevis (Schltr.) M.W.Chase & N.H.Williams	Peru	
	Comparettia campoverdei (D.E.Benn. & Christenson) M.W.Chase & N.H.Williams	Peru (Pasco)	1,925 metres (6,316 ft)
	Comparettia carinata (Rolfe) M.W.Chase & N.H.Williams	Ecuador	
	Comparettia chiribogae (Dodson) M.W.Chase & N.H.Williams	Ecuador	1,500–2,300 metres (4,900–7,500 ft)
	Comparettia coccinea Lindl.	Venezuela, Brazil (Espirito Santo, Rio de Janeiro, Minas Gerais, Sao Paulo, and Parana), Peru and Bolivia	390 metres (1,280 ft)
	Comparettia coimbrae (Dodson & R.Vásquez) M.W.Chase & N.H.Williams	Bolivia (Santa Cruz)	1,200–1,400 metres (3,900–4,600 ft)
	Comparettia corydaloides (Kraenzl.) M.W.Chase & N.H.Williams	Bolivia (Maipiri)	500 metres (1,600 ft)
	Comparettia crucicornibus (Senghas, D.E.Benn. & Christenson) M.W.Chase & N.H.Williams	Peru (Pasco)	1,200 metres (3,900 ft)
	Comparettia delcastilloi (D.E.Benn. & Christenson) M.W.Chase & N.H.Williams	Peru (Junin)	1,600–2,000 metres (5,200–6,600 ft)
	Comparettia ecalcarata (Determann) M.W.Chase & N.H.Williams	French Guiana, Brazil (Para)	150 metres (490 ft)
	Comparettia embreei (Dodson) M.W.Chase & N.H.Williams	Ecuador	500–1,000 metres (1,600–3,300 ft)
	Comparettia equitans (Schltr.) M.W.Chase & N.H.Williams	Peru (Junin)	
	Comparettia falcata Poepp. & Endl.	Cuba, Dominican Republic, Haiti, Jamaica, Puerto Rico, Mexico, Guatemala, Belize, El Salvador, Honduras, Nicaragua, Costa Rica, Panama, French Guiana, Venezuela, Colombia, Ecuador, Peru, Bolivia, and Brazil	200–3,000 metres (660–9,840 ft)
	Comparettia frymirei (Dodson) M.W.Chase & N.H.Williams	Ecuador (Canar)	1,000 metres (3,300 ft)
	Comparettia gentryi (Dodson) M.W.Chase & N.H.Williams	Ecuador	600–1,000 metres (2,000–3,300 ft)
	Comparettia granizoi (Königer) M.W.Chase & N.H.Williams	Peru (Junin)	
	Comparettia hauensteinii (Königer) M.W.Chase & N.H.Williams	Bolivia (Cochabamba)	
	Comparettia heterophylla (Rchb.f.) M.W.Chase & N.H.Williams	Ecuador	950–2,000 metres (3,120–6,560 ft)
	Comparettia hirtzii (Dodson) M.W.Chase & N.H.Williams	Colombia (Valle de Cauca), Ecuador	2,200–2,850 metres (7,220–9,350 ft)
	Comparettia ignea P.Ortiz	Colombia	1,400–1,600 metres (4,600–5,200 ft)
	Comparettia jamiesonii (Lindl. & Paxton) M.W.Chase & N.H.Williams	Ecuador	2,000–2,700 metres (6,600–8,900 ft)
	Comparettia janeae (Dodson & R.Vásquez) M.W.Chase & N.H.Williams	Bolivia	1,820 metres (5,970 ft)
	Comparettia kerspei (Senghas) M.W.Chase & N.H.Williams	Peru	1,600 metres (5,200 ft)
	Comparettia kroemeri (R.Vásquez & Dodson) M.W.Chase & N.H.Williams	Bolivia (Yungas)	750 metres (2,460 ft)
	Comparettia langkastii (Senghas) M.W.Chase & N.H.Williams	Ecuador	1,200 metres (3,900 ft)
	Comparettia langlassei (Schltr.) M.W.Chase & N.H.Williams	Colombia, Ecuador	2,500 metres (8,200 ft)
	Comparettia larae (Dodson & R.Vásquez) M.W.Chase & N.H.Williams	Bolivia (La Paz)	2,000 metres (6,600 ft)
	Comparettia latipetala (C.Schweinf.) M.W.Chase & N.H.Williams	Peru	900–1,800 metres (3,000–5,900 ft)
	Comparettia limatamboensis (Dodson & R.Vásquez) M.W.Chase & N.H.Williams	Bolivia (Cochabamba)	1,150 metres (3,770 ft)
	Comparettia luerae (Dodson) M.W.Chase & N.H.Williams	Ecuador	1,500–2,000 metres (4,900–6,600 ft)
	Comparettia macroplectron Rchb.f. & Triana	Colombia (Boyaca, Meta, Cundinamarca )	1,200–2,000 metres (3,900–6,600 ft)
	Comparettia × maloi I.Bock	southeastern Ecuador	
	Comparettia markgrafii (Friedrich) M.W.Chase & N.H.Williams	Peru (Junin)	
	Comparettia micrantha (Poepp. & Endl.) M.W.Chase & N.H.Williams	Ecuador, Peru and Brazil	140–900 metres (460–2,950 ft)
	Comparettia minuta (Garay & Dunst.) M.W.Chase & N.H.Williams	Venezuela	1,300–1,400 metres (4,300–4,600 ft)
	Comparettia mirthae (Königer) M.W.Chase & N.H.Williams	Peru (San Martin)	1,750 metres (5,740 ft)
	Comparettia moroniae D.E.Benn. & Christenson	Peru	
	Comparettia neudeckeri (Königer) M.W.Chase & N.H.Williams	Bolivia	1,400 metres (4,600 ft)
	Comparettia newyorkorum (R.Vásquez, Ibisch & I.G.Vargas) M.W.Chase & N.H.Williams	Bolivia (Cochabamba)	2,000 metres (6,600 ft)
	Comparettia oliverosii (Königer) M.W.Chase & N.H.Williams	Peru	
	Comparettia ottonis (Klotzsch) M.W.Chase & N.H.Williams	Venezuela, Colombia	980–2,500 metres (3,220–8,200 ft)
	Comparettia pacensium (Senghas & Leferenz) M.W.Chase & N.H.Williams	Bolivia (La Paz)	1,300 metres (4,300 ft)
	Comparettia palatina (Senghas, C.Lang & Kast) M.W.Chase & N.H.Williams	Colombia	
	Comparettia paniculata (C.Schweinf.) M.W.Chase & N.H.Williams	Peru (Junin)	1,800 metres (5,900 ft)
	Comparettia papillosa (D.E.Benn. & Christenson) M.W.Chase & N.H.Williams	Peru (Junin)	1,680 metres (5,510 ft)
	Comparettia paraguaensis (Garay & Dunst.) M.W.Chase & N.H.Williams	Venezuela (Bolivar), Brazil (Para)	375 metres (1,230 ft)
	Comparettia penduliflora (Senghas & Thiv) M.W.Chase & N.H.Williams	Bolivia	
	Comparettia peruvioides M.W.Chase & N.H.Williams	Peru (Junin)	
	Comparettia portillae (Königer) M.W.Chase & N.H.Williams	Ecuador	1,700 metres (5,600 ft)
	Comparettia pulchella Schltr.	Colombia (Antioquia)	
	Comparettia rauhii (Senghas) M.W.Chase & N.H.Williams	Peru (Junin)	
	Comparettia romansii (Dodson & Garay) M.W.Chase & N.H.Williams	Ecuador	600 metres (2,000 ft)
	Comparettia rubriflora (Senghas) M.W.Chase & N.H.Williams	Peru (Cusco)	
	Comparettia saccata Poepp. & Endl.	Peru (Junin)	
	Comparettia schaeferi (Senghas) M.W.Chase & N.H.Williams	Peru	1,500 metres (4,900 ft)
	Comparettia seegeri (Senghas, Leferenz & I.Bock) M.W.Chase & N.H.Williams	Bolivia	1,400 metres (4,600 ft)
	Comparettia serrilabia (C.Schweinf.) M.W.Chase & N.H.Williams	Peru (Cusco)	2,000–2,300 metres (6,600–7,500 ft)
	Comparettia sillarensis (Dodson & R.Vásquez) M.W.Chase & N.H.Williams	Bolivia (Cochabamba)	1,800 metres (5,900 ft)
	Comparettia sotoana Pupulin & G.Merino	Ecuador (Morona-Santiago)	1,200 metres (3,900 ft)
	Comparettia speciosa Rchb.f.	southeastern Ecuador and northwestern Peru	700–2,000 metres (2,300–6,600 ft)
	Comparettia splendens Schltr.	Bolivia (La Paz)	750–1,800 metres (2,460–5,910 ft)
	Comparettia stenochila (Lindl.) M.W.Chase & N.H.Williams	Venezuela	1,800 metres (5,900 ft)
	Comparettia suareziorum (Kolan., Szlach. & Mystkowska) J.M.H.Shaw	Ecuador	
	Comparettia thivii (Senghas) M.W.Chase & N.H.Williams	Bolivia	1,600 metres (5,200 ft)
	Comparettia topoana (Dodson) M.W.Chase & N.H.Williams	Ecuador (Pastaza)	1,300 metres (4,300 ft)
	Comparettia tuerckheimii (Schltr.) M.W.Chase & N.H.Williams	Mexico (Oaxaca, Chiapas), Costa Rica, El Salvador, Guatemala, Honduras, Nicaragua, Panamá	1,500–2,700 metres (4,900–8,900 ft)
	Comparettia tungurahuae (Dodson) M.W.Chase & N.H.Williams	Ecuador	1,300–2,700 metres (4,300–8,900 ft)
	Comparettia vallyana Collantes & G.Gerlach	Peru	
	Comparettia variegata (Cogn.) M.W.Chase & N.H.Williams	Ecuador, Colombia (Antioquia)	1,600 metres (5,200 ft)
	Comparettia vasquezii (Dodson & M.W.Chase) M.W.Chase & N.H.Williams	Bolivia (Cochabamba)	1,800 metres (5,900 ft)
	Comparettia williamsii (Dodson) M.W.Chase & N.H.Williams	Ecuador	500 metres (1,600 ft)
	Comparettia wuerstlei (Senghas) M.W.Chase & N.H.Williams	Peru (Junin)	
