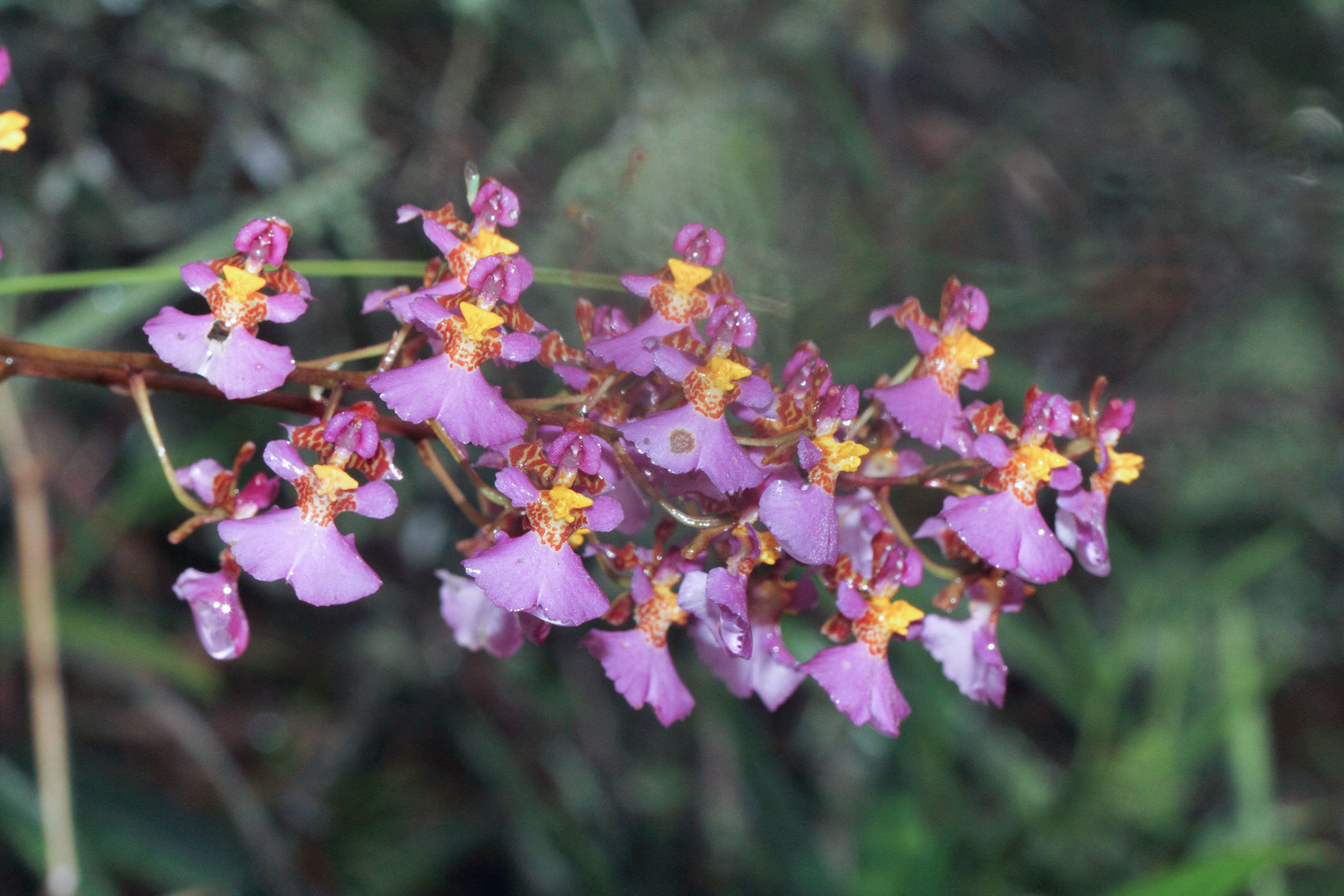
- Tolumnia velutina, Dominican Republic

Scientific classification
- Kingdom: Plantae
- Clade: Tracheophytes
- Clade: Angiosperms
- Clade: Monocots
- Order: Asparagales
- Family: Orchidaceae
- Subfamily: Epidendroideae
- Tribe: Cymbidieae
- Subtribe: Oncidiinae
- Genus: Tolumnia; Raf.

Synonyms
- List: Olgasis Raf.; Xaritonia Raf.; Antillanorchis (C.Wright ex Griseb.) Garay; Hispaniella Braem; Jamaiciella Braem; Braasiella Braem, Lückel & Rüssmann; Gudrunia Braem

= Tolumnia (plant) =

Genus of orchids

Tolumnia (abbreviated Tolu.), is a genus in the family Orchidaceae. Previously known as the "equitant oncidiums", the species were segregated from the mega-genus Oncidium by Guido Braem in 1986. Dancing-lady orchid is a common name for some species in this genus.

== Distribution ==
The genus is primarily native to the Greater Antilles, with a few species extending into Florida, the Lesser Antilles, Mexico, Central America and northern South America (from Colombia to French Guiana).

== Description ==
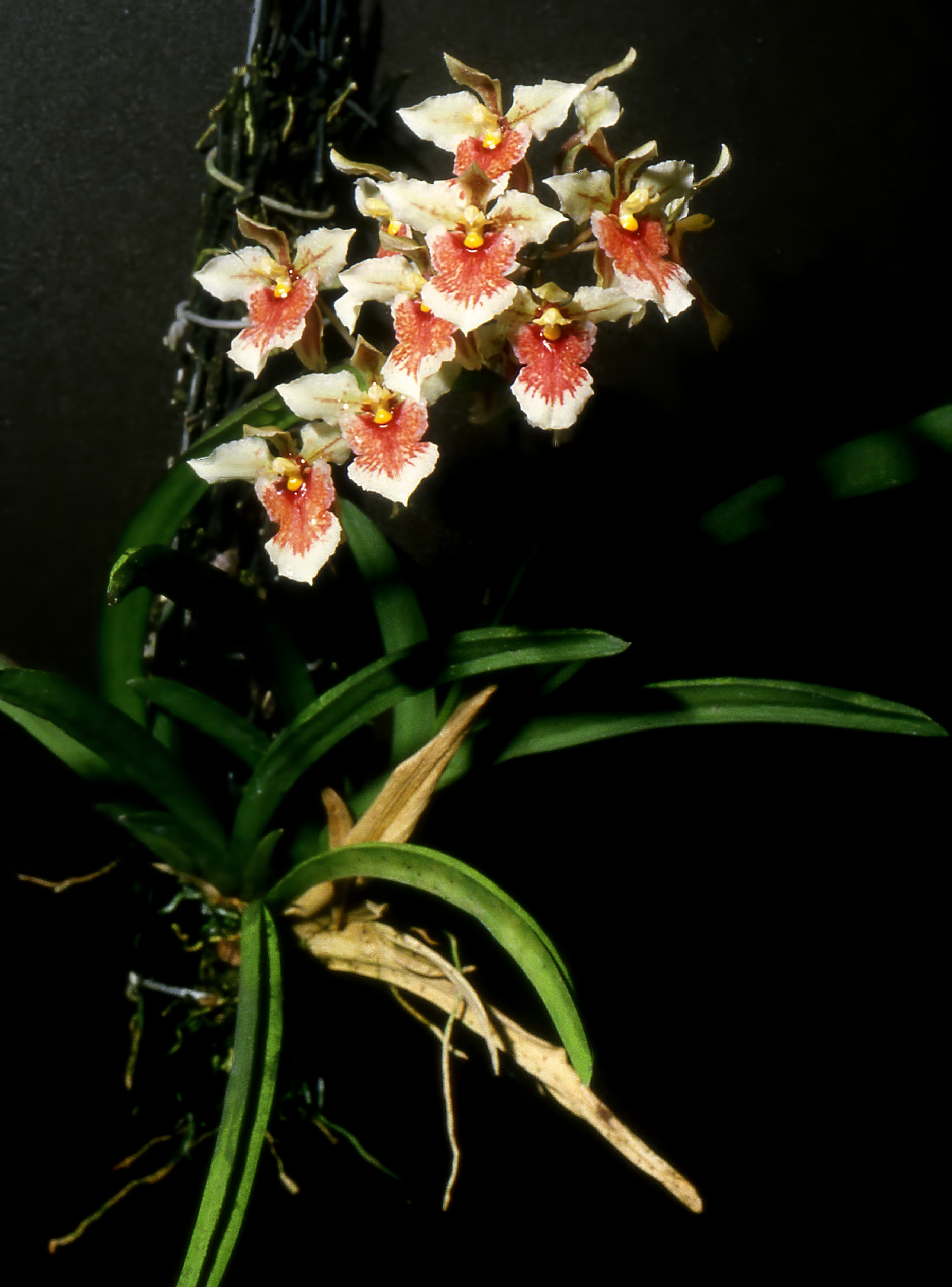
Tolumnia triquetra

The plants are small, usually epiphytic, with small or absent pseudobulbs completely covered by leaves, which are triangular or circular in cross section and overlap each other at base to resemble a fan.

The inflorescences arise between the leaf base and bear colorful, showy flowers. The labella are large, ornamented by variously shaped calli. The column bears prominent wings flanking the stigma.

=== Pollination ===
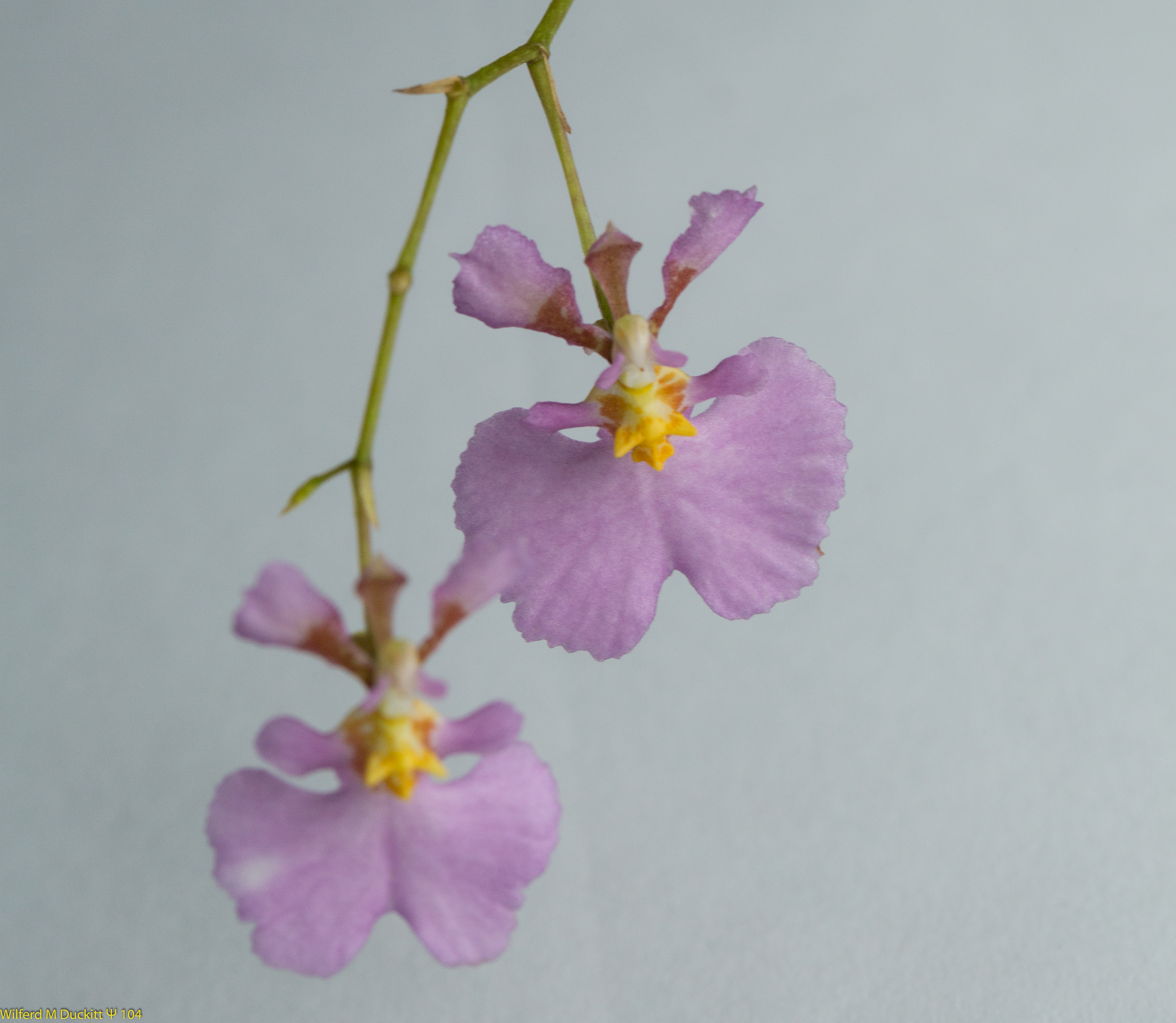
Tolumnia sylvestris

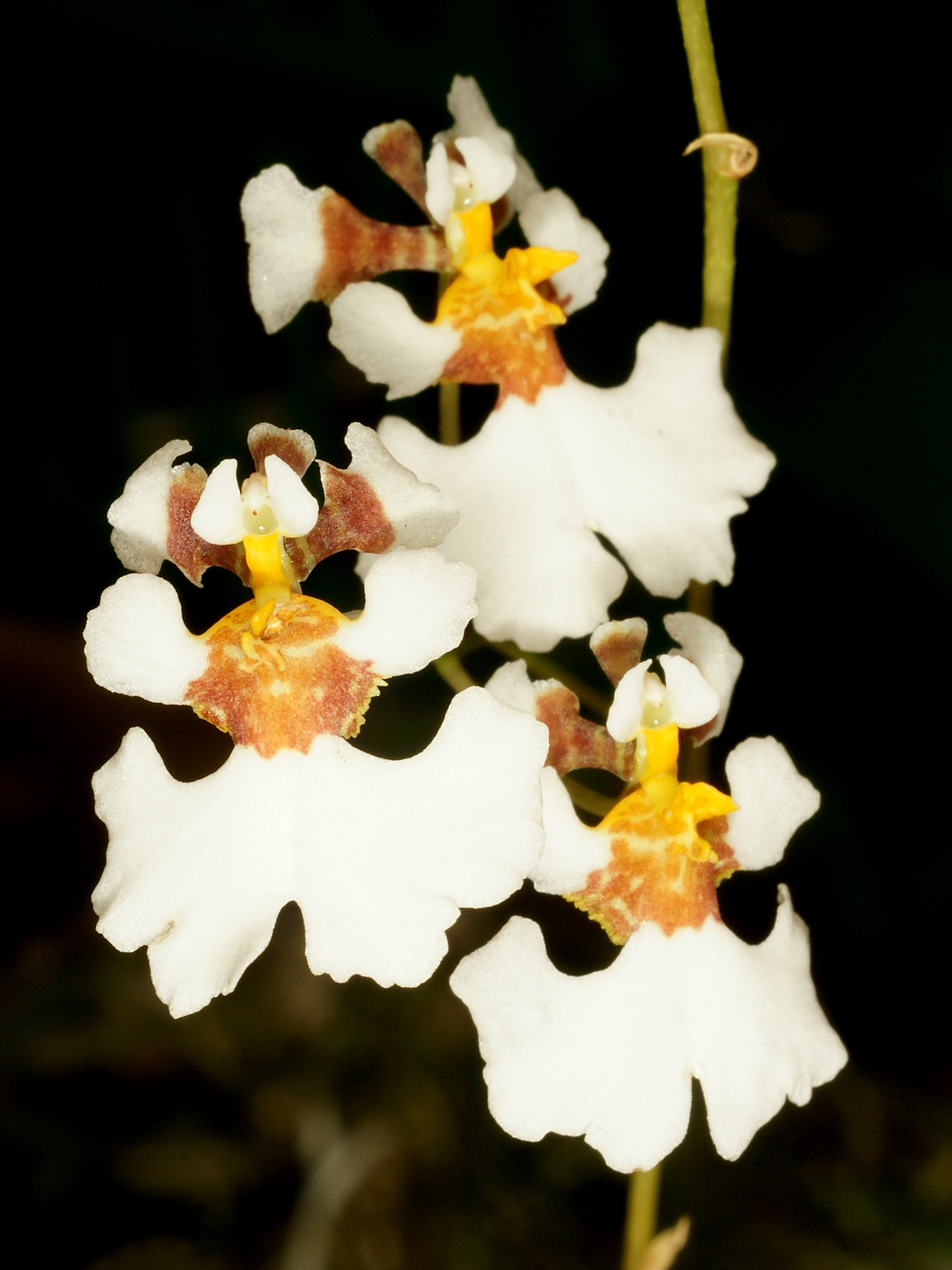
Tolumnia variegata

Species in the genus are pollinated by oil-collecting bees of the genus Centris. Instead of producing oils as a reward for their pollinators, Tolumnia species instead mimic the oil-producing flowers of Malpighiaceae species. Flowers are self-incompatible. Fragrance strength can vary greatly even within a species.

== Species ==
1. Tolumnia arizajuliana (Withner & J.Jiménez Alm.) Ackerman, 1997
2. Tolumnia bahamensis (Nash) Braem, 1986
3. Tolumnia calochila (Cogn.) Braem, 1986
4. Tolumnia compressicaulis (Withner) Braem, 1986
5. Tolumnia gauntlettii (Withner & Jesup) Nir, 1994
6. Tolumnia guianensis (Aubl.) Braem, 1986
7. Tolumnia guibertiana (A.Rich.) Braem, 1986
8. Tolumnia gundlachii (C.Wright ex Griseb.) N.H.Williams & Ackerman, 2007
9. Tolumnia guttata (L.) Nir, 1994
10. Tolumnia haitiensis (Leonard & Ames) Braem, 1986
11. Tolumnia hawkesiana (Moir) Braem, 1986
12. Tolumnia henekenii (Schomburgk ex Lindl.) Nir, 1994
13. Tolumnia leiboldi (Rchb. f.) Braem, 1986
14. Tolumnia lucayana (Nash) Braem, 1986
15. Tolumnia pulchella (Hook.) Rafinesque, 1837
16. Tolumnia quadriloba (Schweinf.) Braem, 1986
17. Tolumnia scandens (Moir) Braem, 1986
18. Tolumnia sylvestris (Lindl.) Braem, 1986
19. Tolumnia triquetra (Sw.) Nir, 1994
20. Tolumnia tuerckheimii (Cogn.) Braem, 1986
21. Tolumnia urophylla (Loddiges ex Lindl.) Braem, 1986
22. Tolumnia usneoides (Lindl.) Braem, 1986
23. Tolumnia variegata (Sw.) Braem, 1986
24. Tolumnia velutina (Lindl. & Paxton) Braem, 1986

=== Synonyms ===
1. Tolumnia acunae (M. A. Diaz) Nir, 2000 (synonym of: Tolumnia tuerckheimii (Cogn.) Braem, 198)
2. Tolumnia borinquensis Sauleda & Ragan, 1996 (synonym of: Tolumnia variegata (Sw.) Braem, 1986)
3. Tolumnia caymanensis (Moir) Braem, 1986 (synonym of: Tolumnia leiboldii (Rchb.f.) Braem, 1986)
4. Tolumnia lemoniana ssp. lemoniana Braem, 1986 (synonym of: Tolumnia guianensis (Aubl.) Braem, 1986)
5. Tolumnia tetrapetala (Jacq.) Braem, 1986 (synonym of Tolumnia guttata (L.) Nir, 1994 )

== Hybrids ==
This list is incomplete.

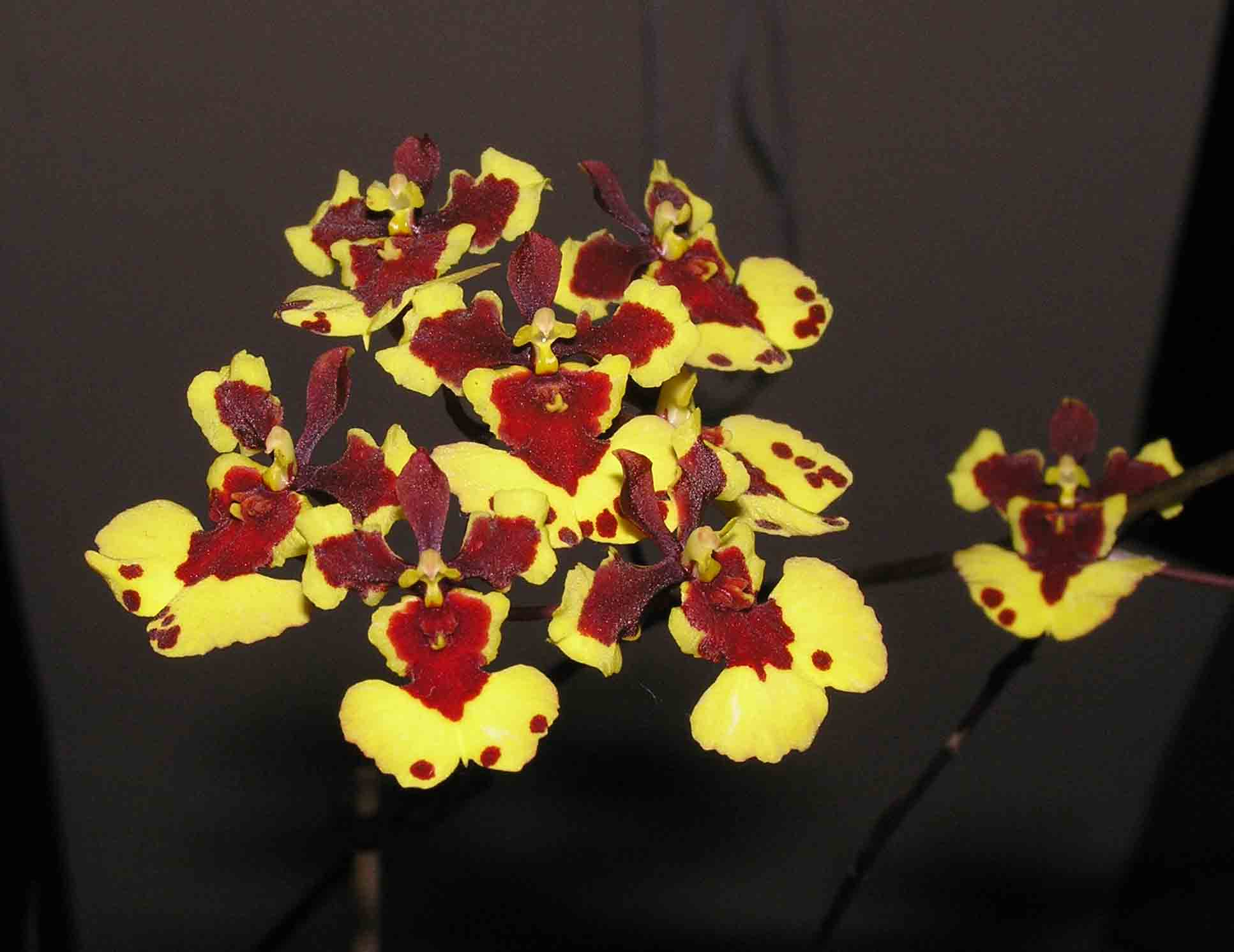
Tolumnia Sniffen

Hybrids of Tolumnia with orchids in other genera are placed in the following nothogenera:

- Aspaleomnia (Alm.) = Tolumnia × Aspasia × Leochilus
- Bramiltumnia (Bmt.) = Tolumnia × Brassia × Miltonia
- Cochlumnia (Ccl.) = Tolumnia × Cochlioda (now Tolumnia × Oncidium = × Oncidumnia)
- Comparumnia (Cmr.) = Tolumnia × Comparettia
- Cuitlumnia (Ctn.) = Tolumnia × Cuitlauzina
- Golumnia (Glm.) = Tolumnia × Gomesa
- Tolucentrum (Tun.) = Tolumnia × Trichocentrum
- Toluglossum (Tgl.) = Tolumnia × Odontoglossum
- Tolumnopsis (Tmp.) = Tolumnia × Miltoniopsis
- Tolutonia (Tut.) = Tolumnia × Miltonia
