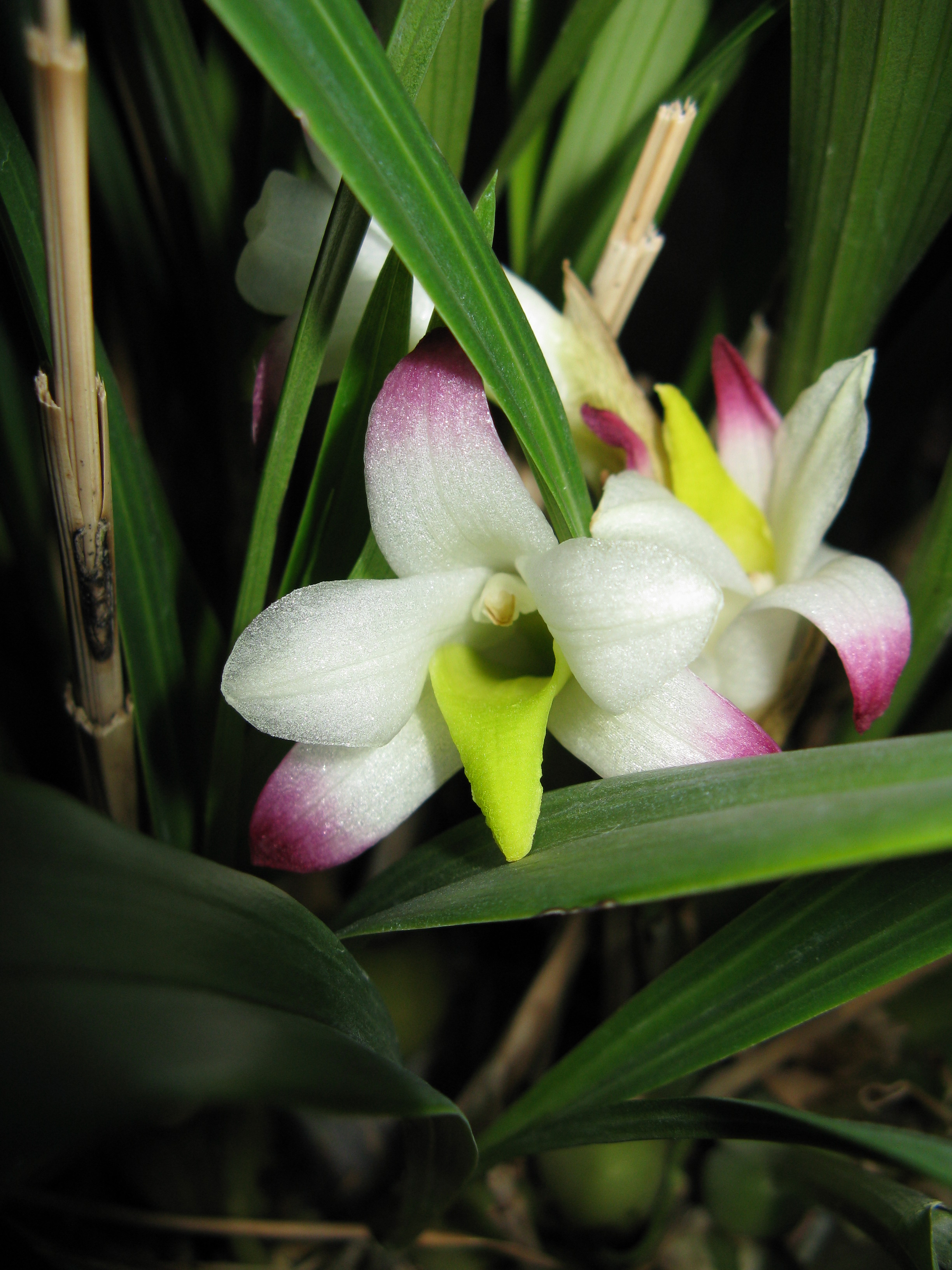

Scientific classification
- Kingdom: Plantae
- Clade: Tracheophytes
- Clade: Angiosperms
- Clade: Monocots
- Order: Asparagales
- Family: Orchidaceae
- Subfamily: Epidendroideae
- Genus: Coelia
- Species: C. bella

Binomial name
- Coelia bella (Lem.) Rchb.f. (1861)

Synonyms
- Bifrenaria bella Lem. (1853) (Basionym); Bothriochilus bellus (Lem.) Lem. (1853)

= Coelia bella =

Species of orchid

Coelia bella is a species of orchid native to Mexico, Guatemala, Honduras, Belize, and Costa Rica. It produces trumpet-shaped flowers that are intensely fragrant, with a smell like marzipan. It flowers during the autumn.

== Cultivation ==
- Light: Medium light from 1500 to 3500 footcandles. Grow as you would Phalaenopsis or Cattleya. This plant does well in East West or South windows. It also does very well with artificial light culture.
- Temperature: These plants will tolerate a wide range of temperatures and seem to do best with intermediate temperatures.
- Water: These plants have a hairy root system like a Paphiopedilum or Phragmipedium. They like water and need to approach dryness at the roots but not dry out completely.
