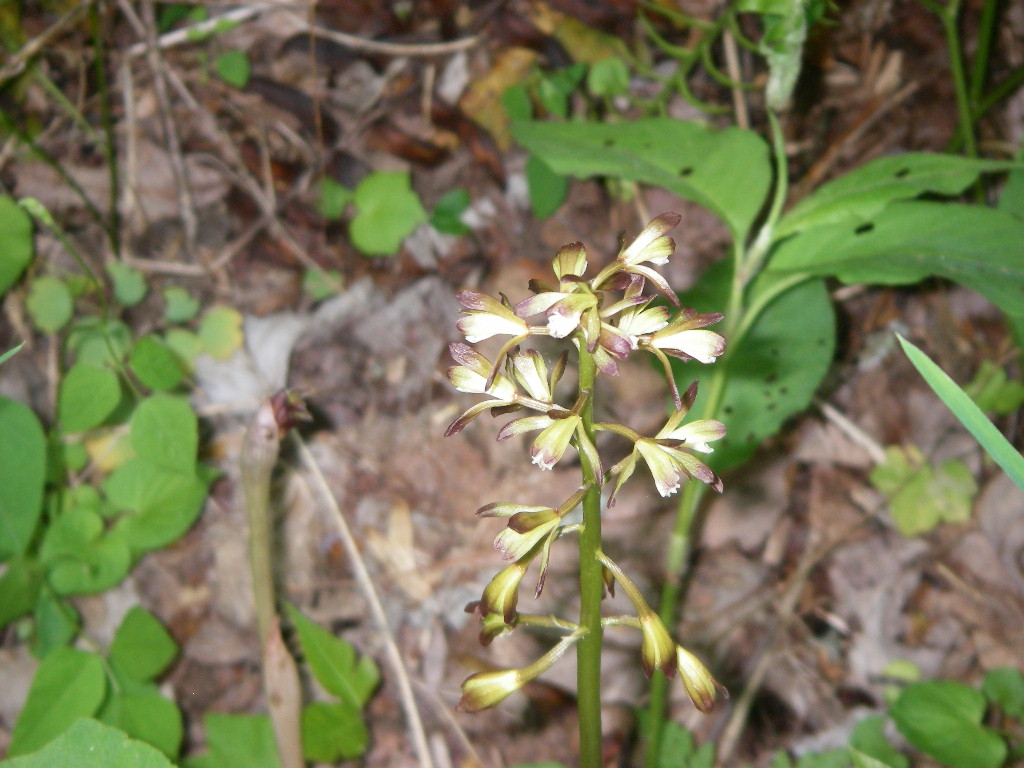
- Aplectrum hyemale

Conservation status
- Secure (NatureServe)

Scientific classification
- Kingdom: Plantae
- Clade: Tracheophytes
- Clade: Angiosperms
- Clade: Monocots
- Order: Asparagales
- Family: Orchidaceae
- Subfamily: Epidendroideae
- Tribe: Epidendreae
- Subtribe: Calypsoinae
- Genus: Aplectrum (Nutt.) Torr.
- Species: A. hyemale

Binomial name
- Aplectrum hyemale (Muhl. ex Willd.) Torr.
- State-level distribution of Aplectrum hyemale in the United States

Synonyms
- List: Cymbidium hyemale Muhl. ex Willd.; Epidendrum hyemale (Muhl. ex Willd.) Poir. in J.B.A.M.de Lamarck; Corallorhiza hyemalis (Muhl. ex Willd.) Nutt.; Aplectra elatior Raf.; Aplectrum spicatum Britton, Sterns & Poggenb.; Aplectrum shortii Rydb. in N.L.Britton; Aplectrum spicatum var. pallidum House; Aplectrum hyemale var. pallidum (House) Barnhart; Aplectrum hyemale f. pallidum (House) House

= Aplectrum =

Genus of plants

Aplectrum hyemale is a species of orchid native to the eastern United States and Canada, from Oklahoma east to the Carolinas and north to Minnesota, Ontario, Quebec and Massachusetts. It is particularly common in the Appalachian Mountains, the Great Lakes Region, and the Ohio and Upper Mississippi Valleys. Isolated populations are also reported from Arizona.

Aplectrum hyemale is the sole species of the genus Aplectrum. The generic name comes from Greek and signifies "spurless". The species is commonly referred to as Adam and Eve or putty root; the latter refers to the mucilaginous fluid which can be removed from the tubers when they are crushed, used by Native Americans to mend pottery.

Aplectrum hyemale spreads underground through the growth of its tubers, forming large colonies. The leaves appear in late November and persist until March. They are uniquely pin-striped, with parallel alternating silvery-white and green stripes. In late May or early June the flower stalk emerges carrying several flowers, each only a few millimeters across. It is sometimes confused with Tipularia discolor, another orchid species that occurs in eastern North America.

There exists a color variation, Aplectrum hyemale var. pallidum which differs in flower color.

== Seeds and Germination ==
Aplectrum flowers are able to self-pollinate, thus are able to produce seeds asexually. Aplectrum produces many dust like seeds and each contain minimal nutrient reserves. Aplectrum seeds are a fraction of a millimeter in diameter and are wind dispersed. Aplectrum seeds are difficult to germinate and propagate because they require a mycorrizal association.

== Pollination Biology ==
Little is known about the pollination of the Aplectrum. It flowers in the late spring and the flowers lack nectar and does not attract many pollinators. Reported floral visitors include the bees Bombus separatus and Bombus americanorum. Since there are very few pollinators of Aplectrum, it relies on autogamy (selfing).

== Predation and Herbivory ==
There are two known predators of Aplectrum. White Tailed Deer (Odocoileus virginianus) which maybe related to decline of Aplectrum in some areas. The second known potential predator is the Spur-Throated Grasshopper (Melanoplus acrophilus). This is the only known account of potential insect herbivory on Aplectrum.

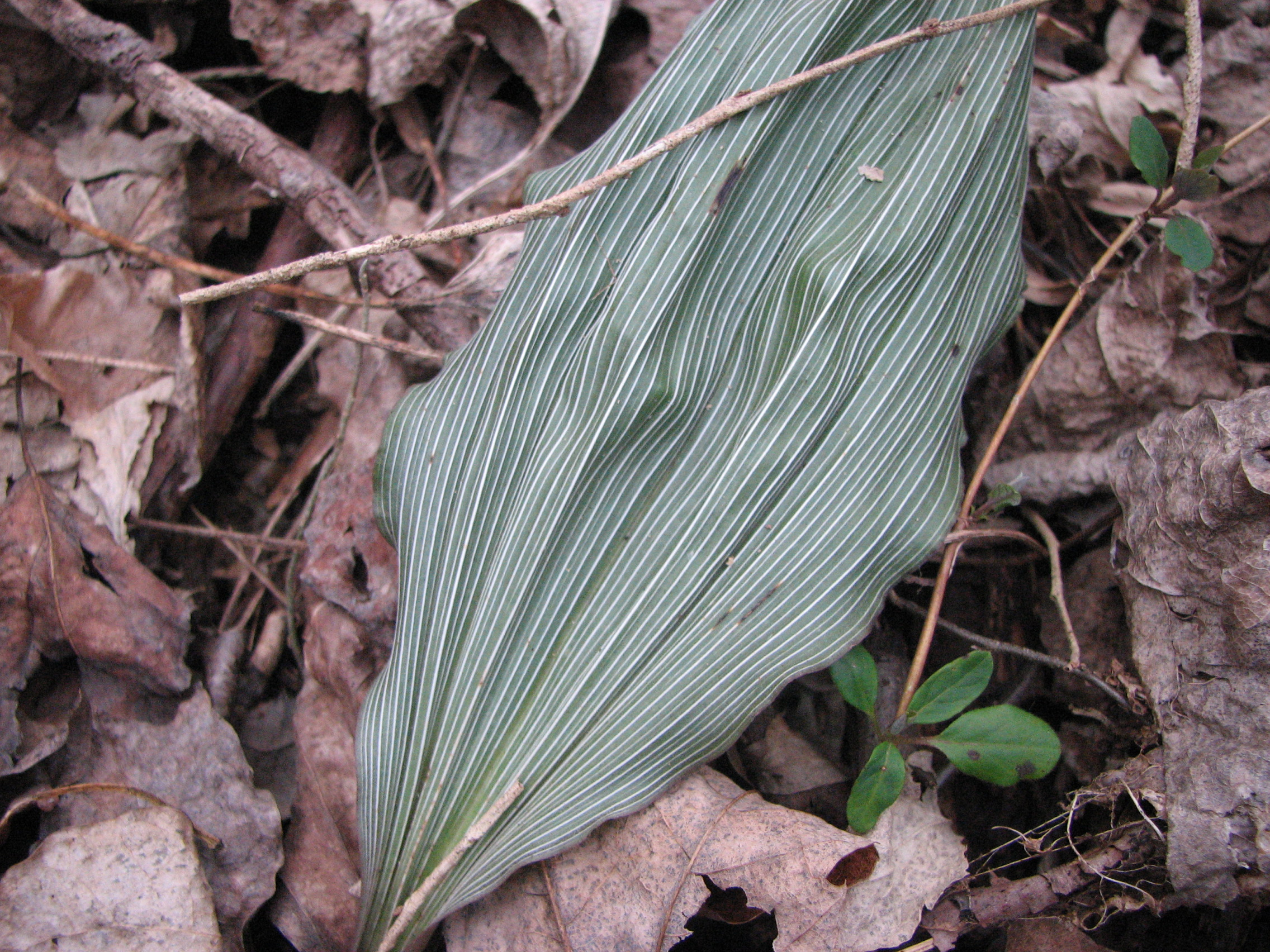
Leaf detail

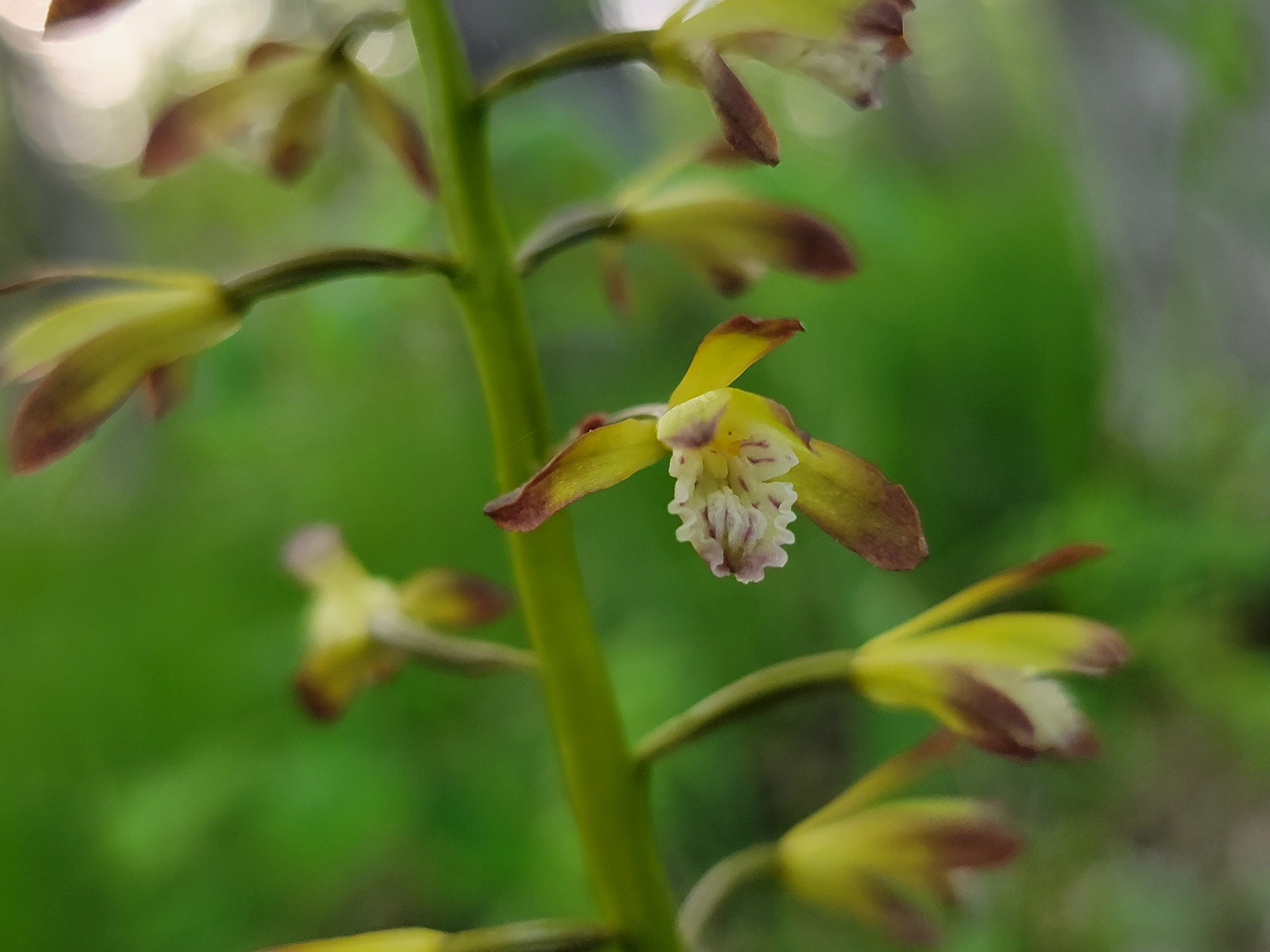
Flower detail

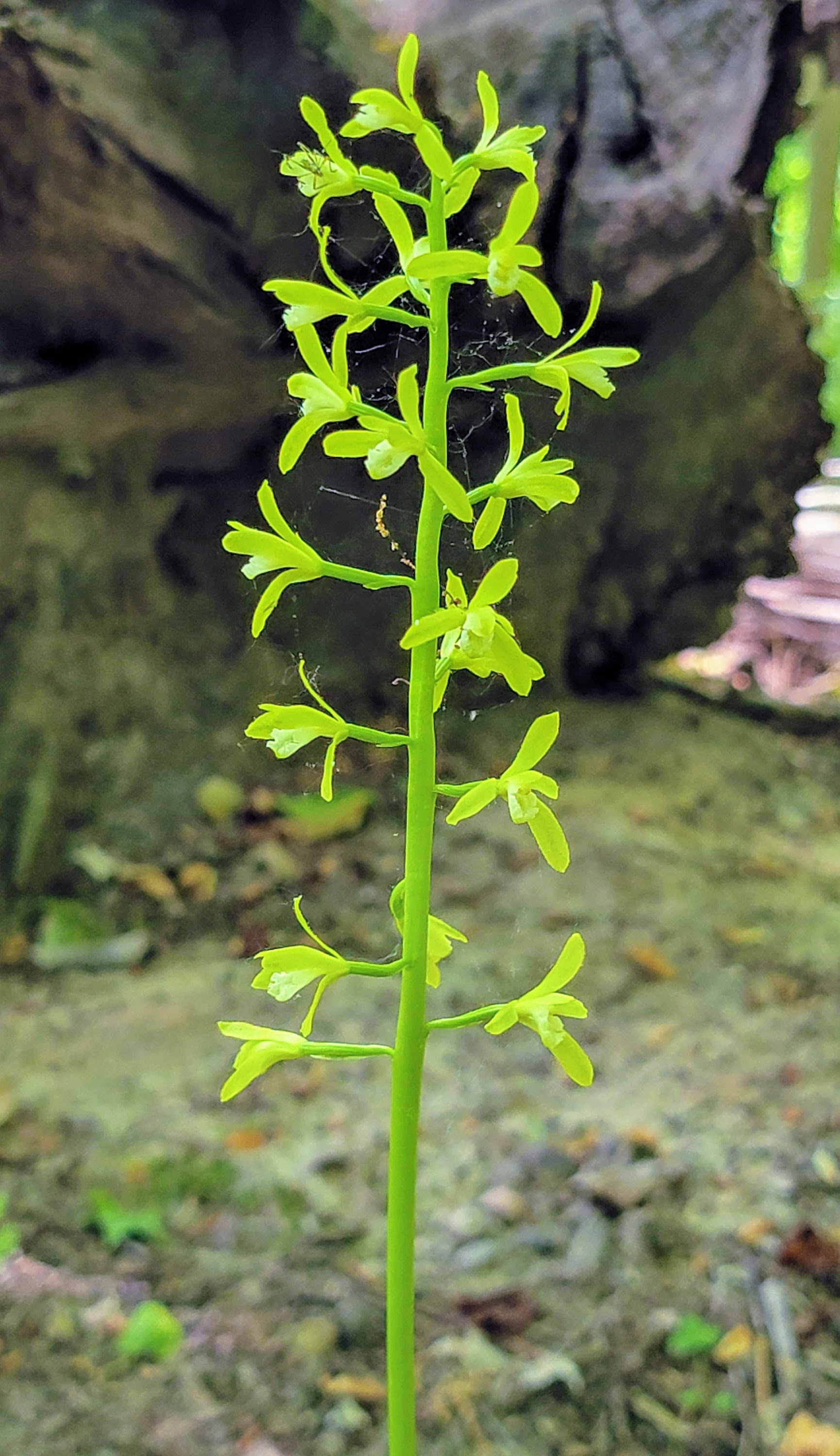
Aplectrum hyemale var. pallidum

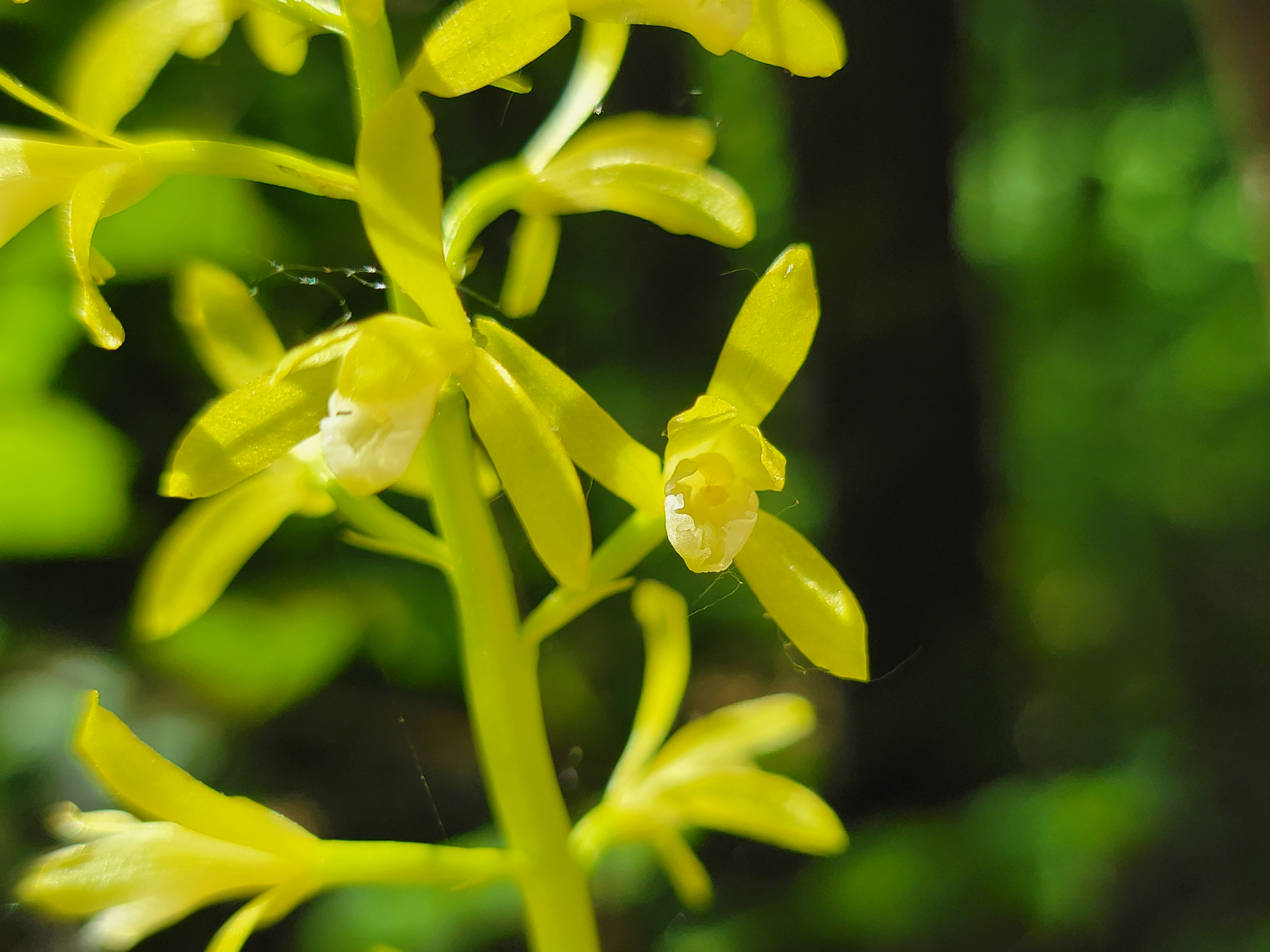
Aplectrum hyemale var. pallidum flower detail
