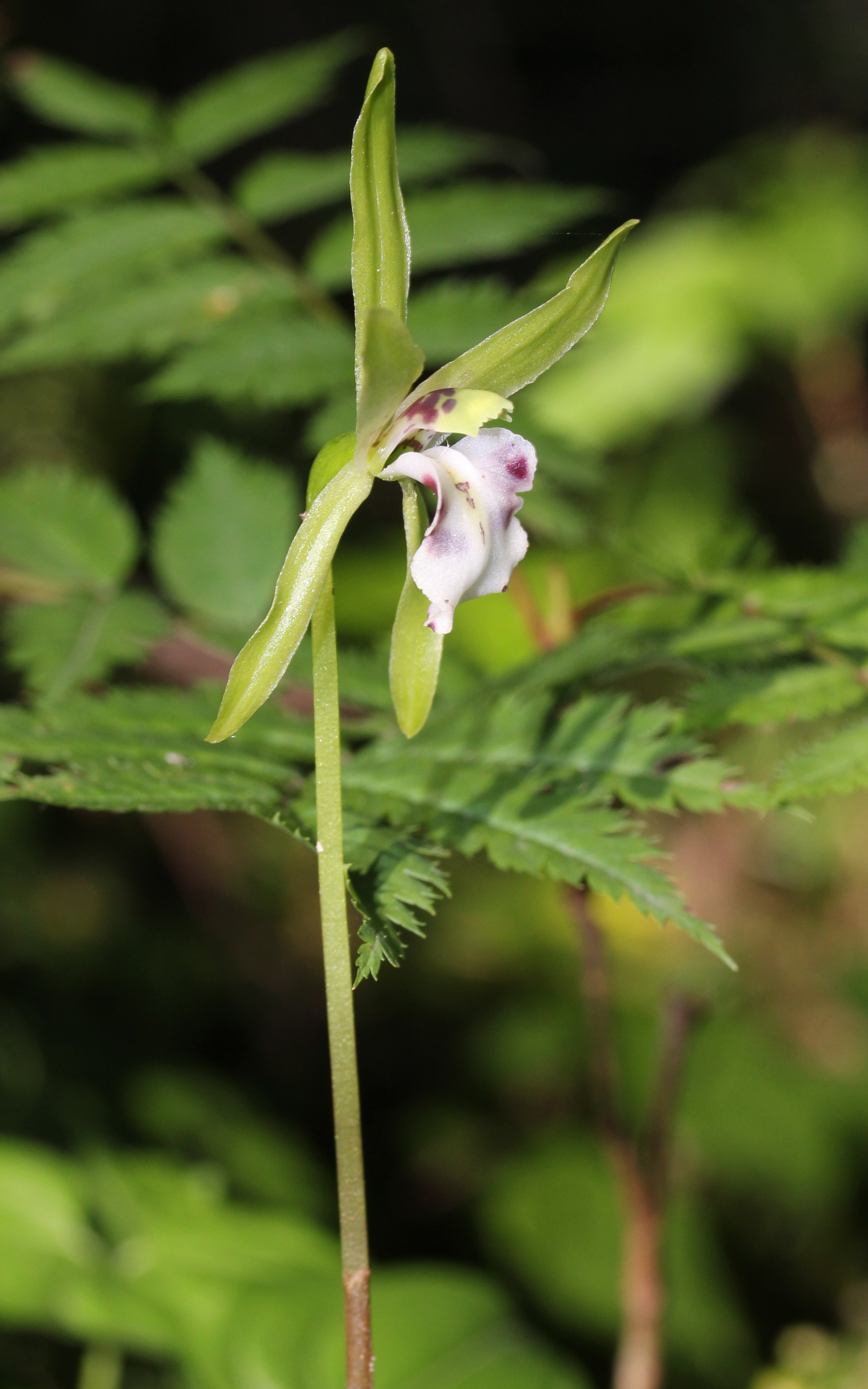

Scientific classification
- Kingdom: Plantae
- Clade: Tracheophytes
- Clade: Angiosperms
- Clade: Monocots
- Order: Asparagales
- Family: Orchidaceae
- Subfamily: Epidendroideae
- Tribe: Epidendreae
- Subtribe: Calypsoinae
- Genus: Dactylostalix; Rchb.f.
- Species: D. ringens

Binomial name
- Dactylostalix ringens Rchb.f.

Synonyms
- Pergamena Finet; Pergamena uniflora Finet; Calypso japonica Maxim. ex Kom.; Calypso bulbosa var. japonica (Maxim. ex Kom.) Makino; Dactylostalix maculosa Miyabe & Kudô

= Dactylostalix =

Genus of orchids

Dactylostalix is a genus of flowering plants from the orchid family, Orchidaceae. At the present time (June 2014), there is only one known species, Dactylostalix ringens. It is native to Japan, the Kuril Islands, and Sakhalin Island.

== See also ==
- List of Orchidaceae genera
