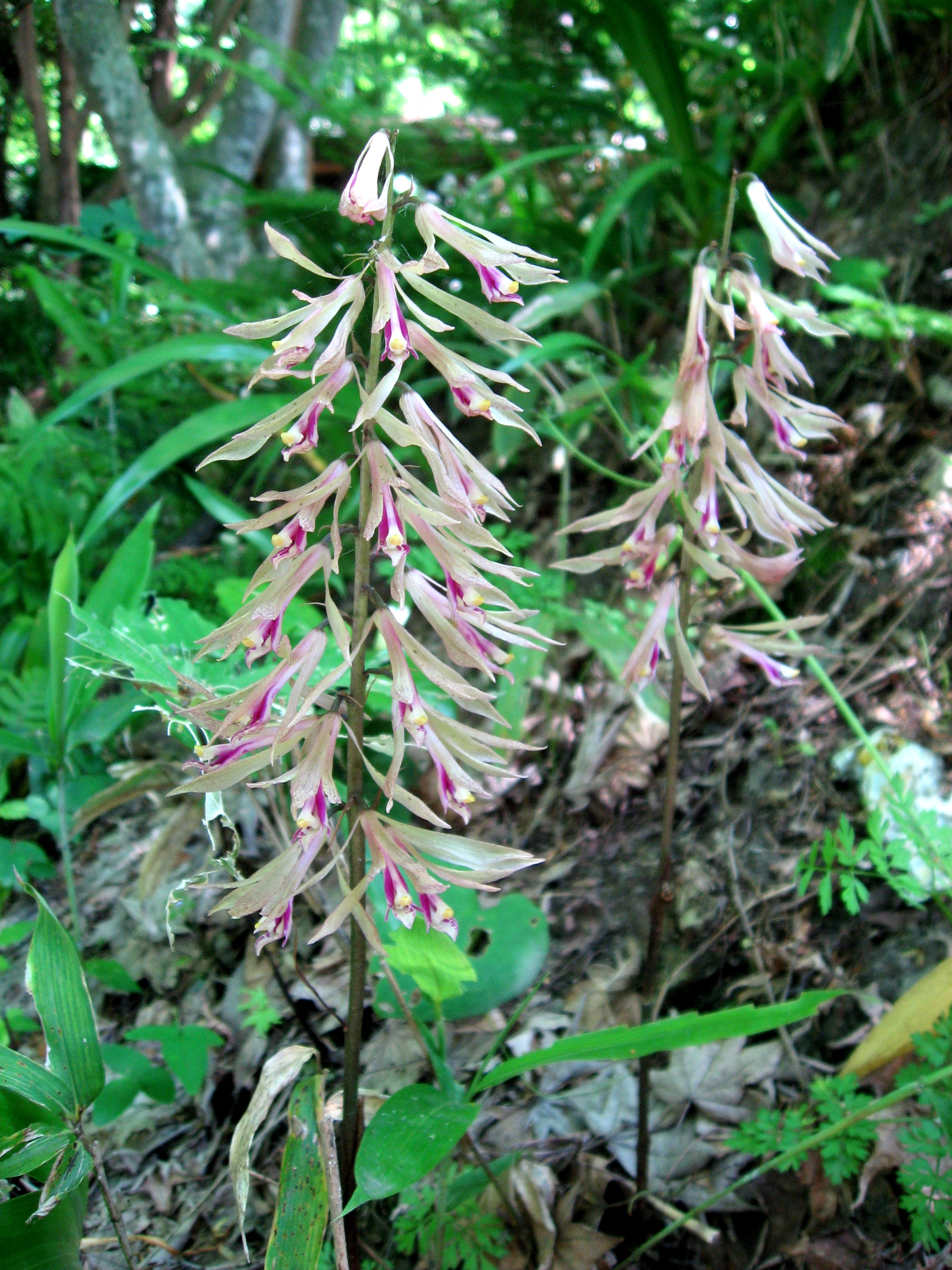
- Cremastra appendiculata

Scientific classification
- Kingdom: Plantae
- Clade: Embryophytes
- Clade: Tracheophytes
- Clade: Angiosperms
- Clade: Monocots
- Order: Asparagales
- Family: Orchidaceae
- Subfamily: Epidendroideae
- Tribe: Epidendreae
- Subtribe: Calypsoinae
- Genus: Cremastra; Lindl. (1833)

Type species
- Cremastra appendiculata (D.Don) Makino

Synonyms
- Hyacinthorchis Blume

= Cremastra =

Genus of orchids

Cremastra is a genus of flowering plants from the orchid family, Orchidaceae. It contains 4 currently recognized species (as of May 2014), native to China, Japan, Korea, Thailand, the Himalayas, and the Russian Far East.

Image	Scientific name	Distribution
	Cremastra aphylla T.Yukawa	Japan
	Cremastra appendiculata (D.Don) Makino	Taiwan, China (Tibet, Anhui, Chongqing, Gansu, Guangdong, Guangxi, Guizhou, Henan, Hubei, Hunan, Jiangsu, Jiangxi, Shaanxi, Shanxi, Sichuan, Zhejiang, Yunnan,) Bhutan, Assam, Nepal, Japan, Korea, Thailand, Vietnam, Kuril, Sakhalin
	Cremastra guizhouensis Q.H.Chen & S.C.Chen	Guizhou
	Cremastra unguiculata (Finet) Finet	Jiangxi, Korea, Japan

== See also ==
- List of Orchidaceae genera
