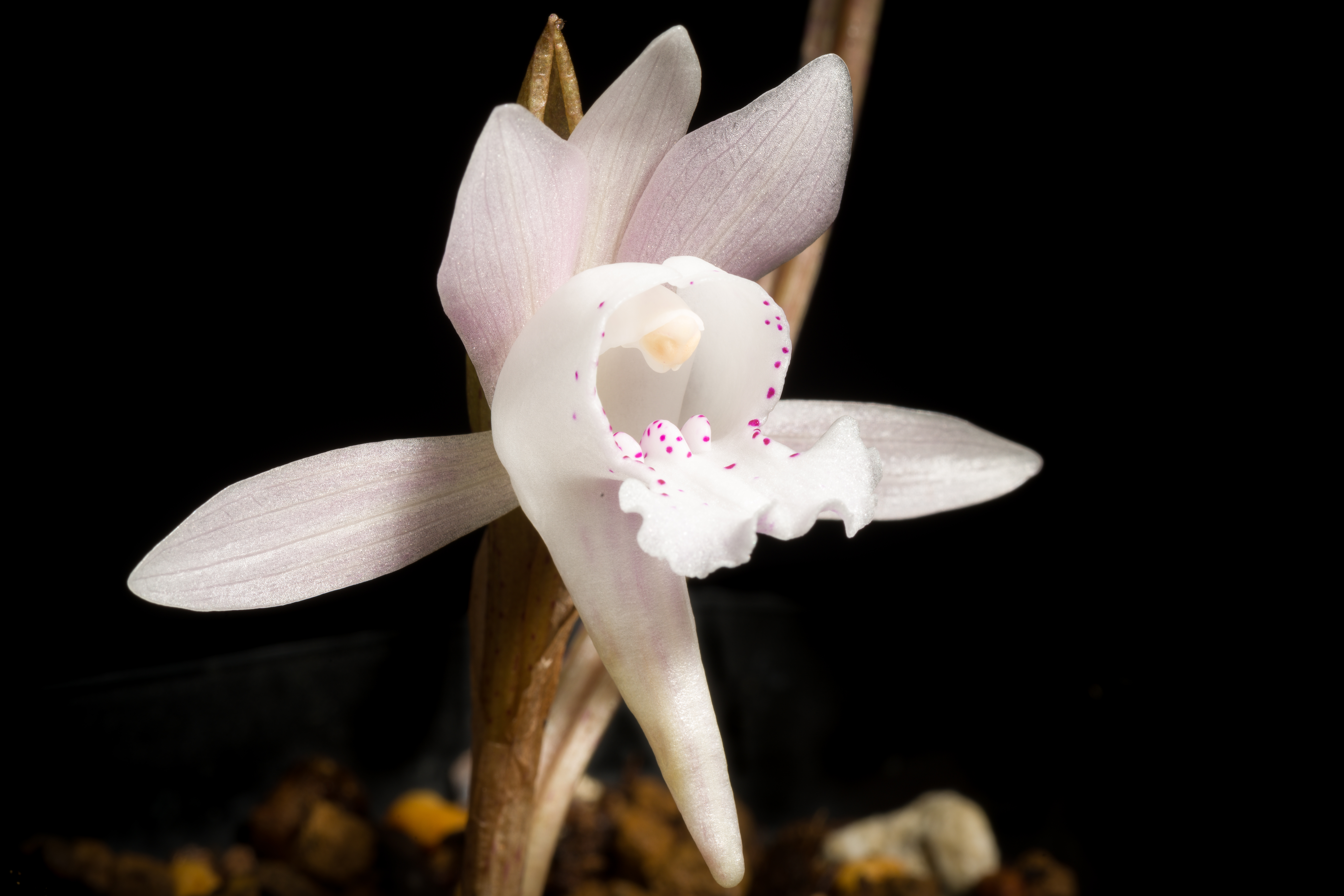

Conservation status
- Endangered (IUCN 3.1)

Scientific classification
- Kingdom: Plantae
- Clade: Tracheophytes
- Clade: Angiosperms
- Clade: Monocots
- Order: Asparagales
- Family: Orchidaceae
- Subfamily: Epidendroideae
- Tribe: Epidendreae
- Subtribe: Calypsoinae
- Genus: Changnienia; S.S.Chien
- Species: C. amoena

Binomial name
- Changnienia amoena S.S.Chien

= Changnienia =

Genus of orchids

Changnienia is a genus of flowering plants from the orchid family, Orchidaceae. Only one species is known, Changnienia amoena, native to China (provinces of Anhui, Hubei, Hunan, Jiangsu, Jiangxi, Shaanxi, Sichuan, and Zhejiang).

== See also ==
- List of Orchidaceae genera
