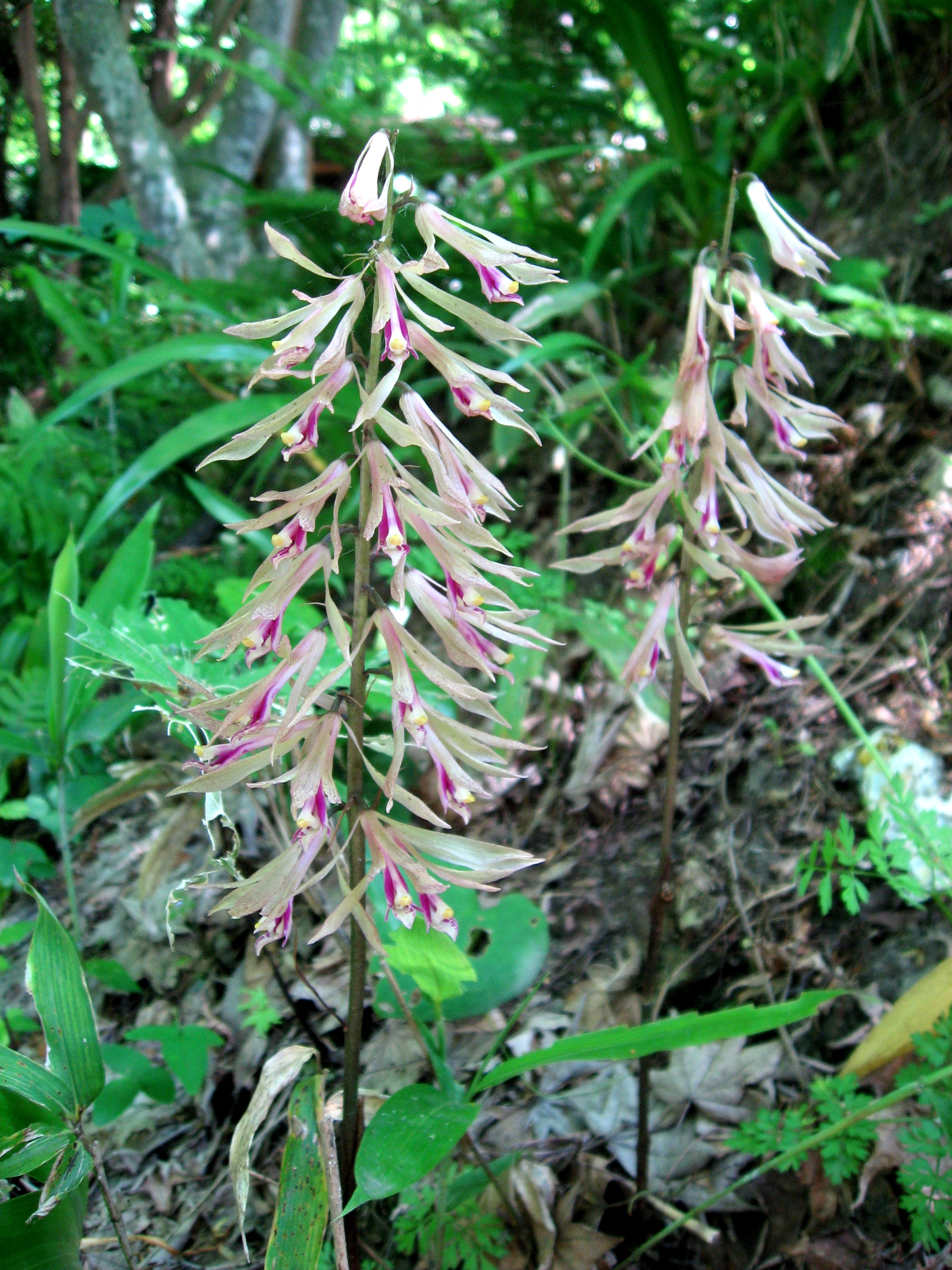

Scientific classification
- Kingdom: Plantae
- Clade: Tracheophytes
- Clade: Angiosperms
- Clade: Monocots
- Order: Asparagales
- Family: Orchidaceae
- Subfamily: Epidendroideae
- Genus: Cremastra
- Species: C. appendiculata

Binomial name
- Cremastra appendiculata (D.Don) Makino (1904)

Synonyms
- Cymbidium appendiculatum D.Don (1825) basionym; Cremastra wallichiana Lindl. (1833)

= Cremastra appendiculata =

Species of orchid

Cremastra appendiculata is an orchid species in the genus Cremastra. It is the type species of its genus.

There two subspecies:

- Cremastra appendiculata var. appendiculata - Taiwan, Tibet, Yunnan, Bhutan, Assam, Nepal, Japan, Korea, Thailand, Vietnam
- Cremastra appendiculata var. variabilis (Blume) I.D.Lund - Kuril, Sakhalin, Japan, Korea, Thailand, Vietnam, Anhui, Chongqing, Gansu, Guangdong, Guangxi, Guizhou, Henan, Hubei, Hunan, Jiangsu, Jiangxi, Shaanxi, Shanxi, Sichuan, Zhejiang
