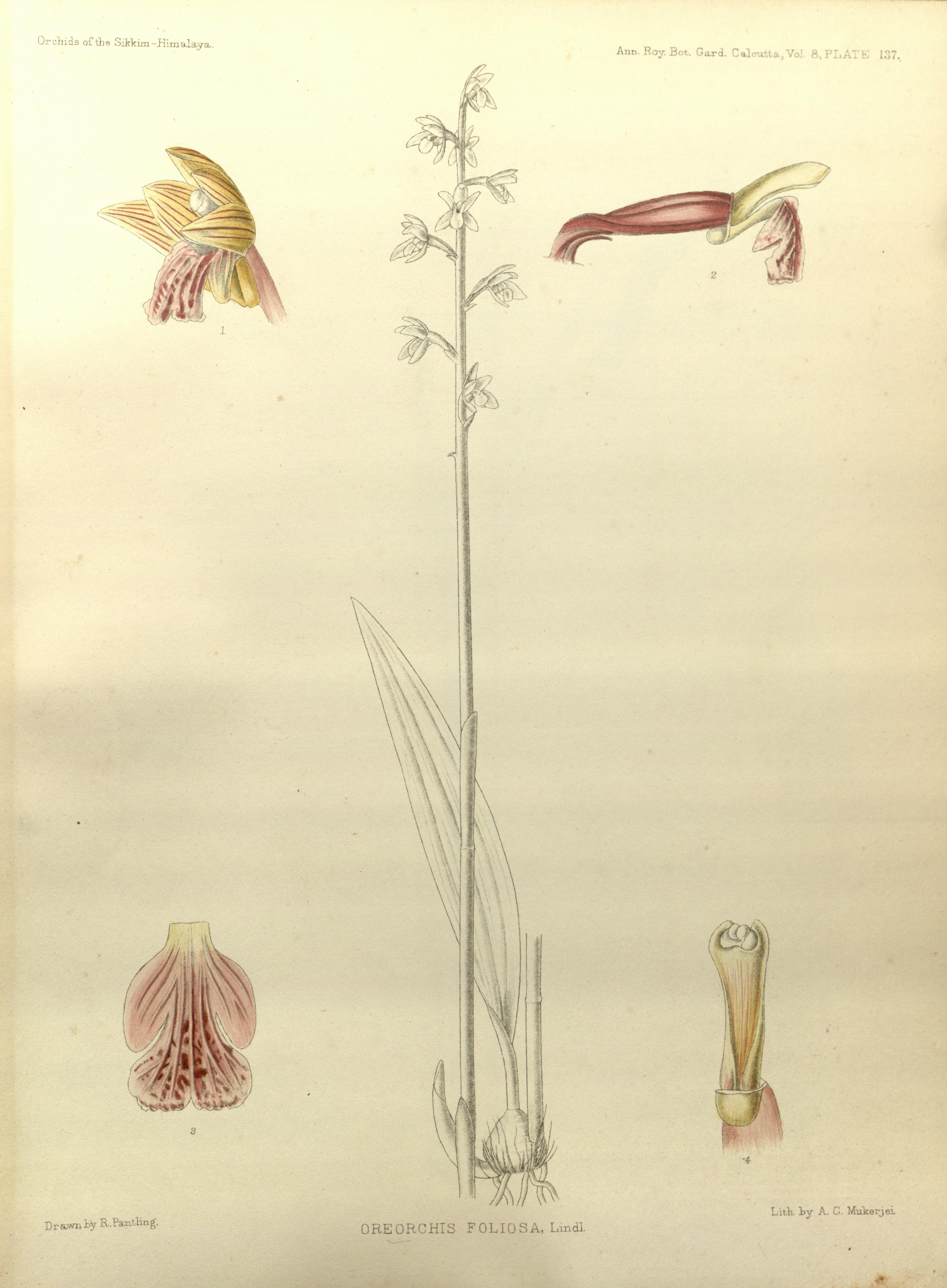
- Oreorchis foliosa

Scientific classification
- Kingdom: Plantae
- Clade: Tracheophytes
- Clade: Angiosperms
- Clade: Monocots
- Order: Asparagales
- Family: Orchidaceae
- Subfamily: Epidendroideae
- Tribe: Epidendreae
- Subtribe: Calypsoinae
- Genus: Oreorchis; Lindl.

Synonyms
- Diplolabellum F.Maek.; Kitigorchis Maek.

= Oreorchis =

Genus of orchids

Oreorchis is a genus of flowering plants from the orchid family, Orchidaceae. It is native to Asia.

Species currently accepted as of June 2014:

- Oreorchis angustata L.O.Williams ex N.Pearce & P.J.Cribb - Sichuan, Yunnan
- Oreorchis aurantiaca P.J.Cribb & N.Pearce - Myanmar
- Oreorchis bilamellata Fukuy. - Taiwan
- Oreorchis discigera W.W.Sm. - Myanmar
- Oreorchis erythrochrysea Hand.-Mazz. - Tibet, Sichuan, Yunnan
- Oreorchis fargesii Finet - Fujian, Gansu, Hubei, Hunan, Shaanxi, Sichuan, Taiwan, Yunnan, Zhejiang
- Oreorchis foliosa (Lindl.) Lindl. - Pakistan, India, Assam, Nepal, Bhutan, Myanmar, Tibet, Sichuan, Taiwan, Yunnan
- Oreorchis itoana (F.Maek.) Perner - Honshu
- Oreorchis micrantha Lindl. - Tibet, Taiwan, Assam, India, Bhutan, Nepal, Myanmar
- Oreorchis nana Schltr. - Sichuan, Yunnan, Hubei
- Oreorchis nepalensis N.Pearce & P.J.Cribb - Nepal, Tibet
- Oreorchis oligantha Schltr. - Gansu, Sichuan, Tibet, Yunnan
- Oreorchis parvula Schltr. - Sichuan, Yunnan
- Oreorchis patens (Lindl.) Lindl. - Japan, Korea, Russian Far East (Kamchatka, Primorye, Sakhalin, Kuril Islands), China (Gansu, Guizhou, Heilongjiang, Henan, Hunan, Jiangxi, Jilin, Liaoning, Sichuan, Taiwan, Yunnan)
- Oreorchis porphyranthes Tuyama - Nepal
- Oreorchis sanguinea (N.Pearce & P.J.Cribb) N.Pearce & P.J.Cribb - Bhutan

== See also ==
- List of Orchidaceae genera
