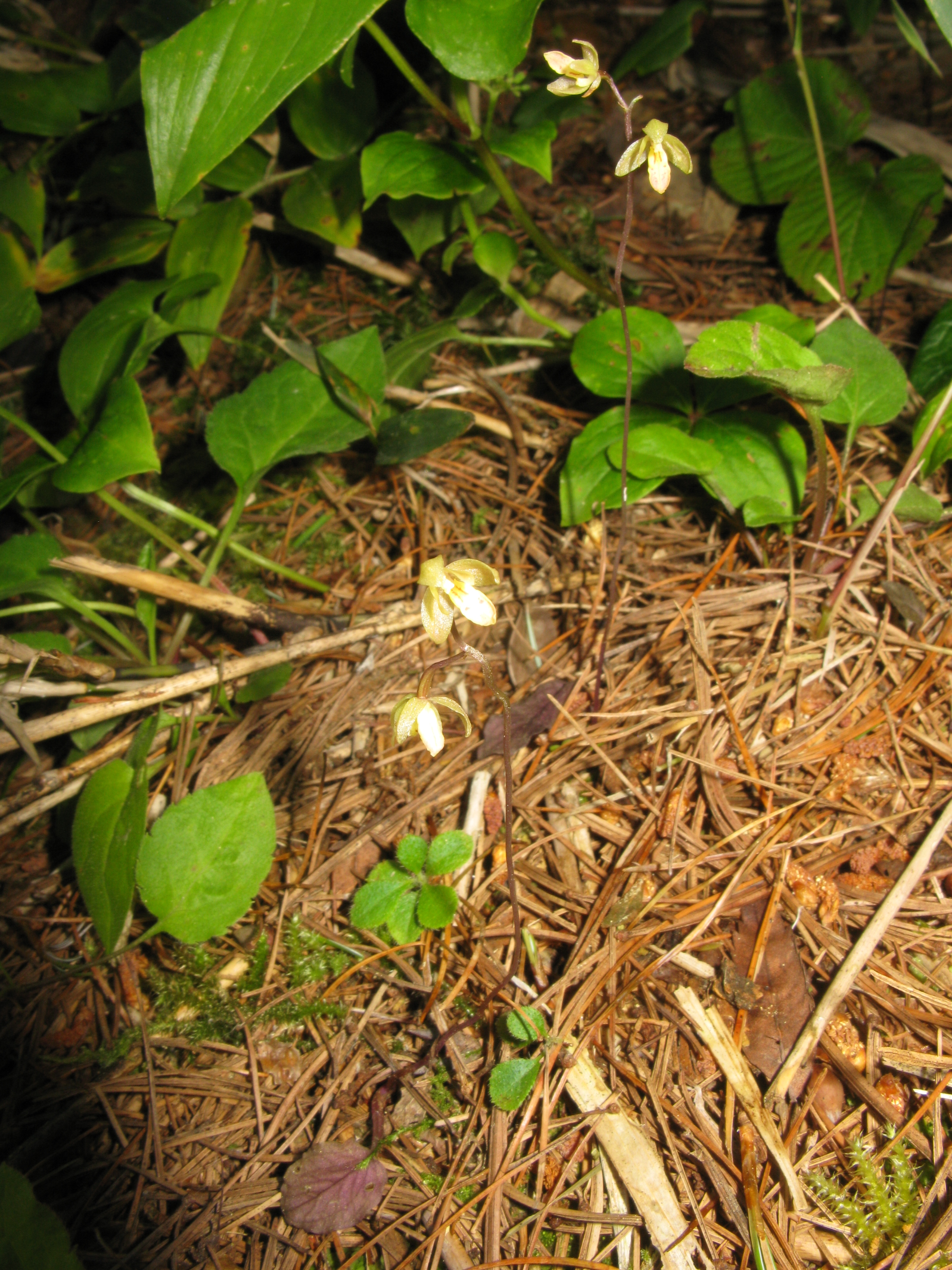
- Ephippianthus schmidtii

Scientific classification
- Kingdom: Plantae
- Clade: Tracheophytes
- Clade: Angiosperms
- Clade: Monocots
- Order: Asparagales
- Family: Orchidaceae
- Subfamily: Epidendroideae
- Tribe: Epidendreae
- Subtribe: Calypsoinae
- Genus: Ephippianthus; Rchb.f. in F.K.Schmidt

Synonyms
- Hakoneaste Maek.

= Ephippianthus =

Genus of orchids

Ephippianthus is a genus of flowering plants from the orchid family, Orchidaceae. It contains two known species, native to northeastern Asia.

Image	Scientific name	Distribution
	Ephippianthus sawadanus (Maek.) Ohwi	Honshu
	Ephippianthus schmidtii Rchb.f.	Japan, Russian Far East (Sakhalin, Kuril Islands, Sakhalin, Khabarovsk)

== See also ==
- List of Orchidaceae genera
