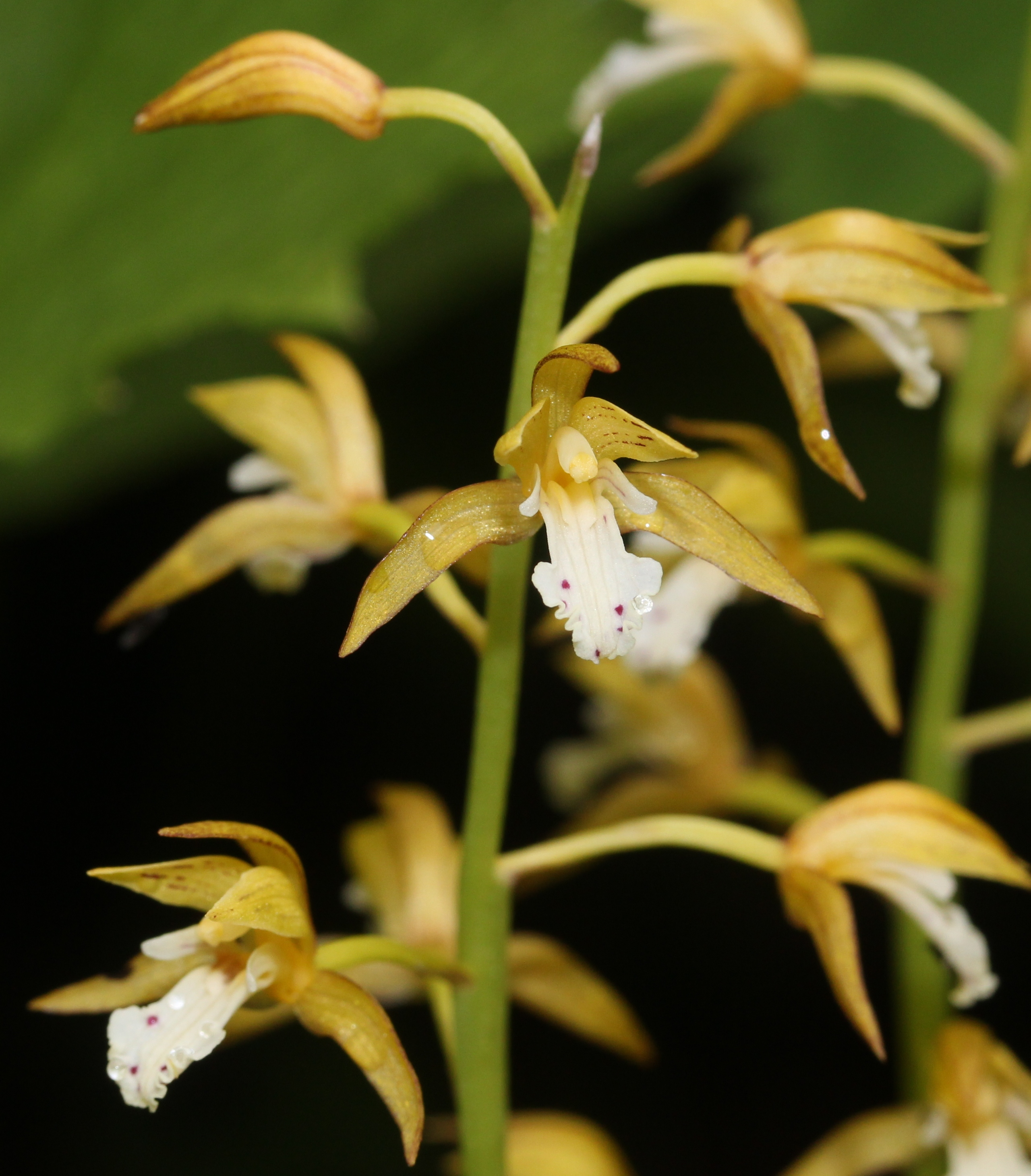
- Oreorchis patens in Mount Yake, Takayama, Gifu prefecture, Japan.

Scientific classification
- Kingdom: Plantae
- Clade: Tracheophytes
- Clade: Angiosperms
- Clade: Monocots
- Order: Asparagales
- Family: Orchidaceae
- Subfamily: Epidendroideae
- Genus: Oreorchis
- Species: O. patens

Binomial name
- Oreorchis patens (Lindl.) Lindl.

Synonyms
- Synonyms list: Corallorhiza patens Lindl.; Oreorchis lancifolia A.Gray; Oreorchis gracilis Franch. & Sav.; Oreorchis patens f. gracilis (Franch. Sav.) Makino; Oreorchis coreana Finet; Oreorchis gracilis var. gracillima Hayata; Oreorchis gracillima (Hayata) Schltr.; Oreorchis patens var. gracilis (Franch. & Sav.) Makino ex Schltr.; Oreorchis setschuanica Ames & Schltr.; Oreorchis yunnanensis Schltr.; Diplolabellum coreanum (Finet) F.Maek; Oreorchis patens var. confluens Hand.-Mazz.; Diplolabellum confluens (Hand.-Mazz.) Garay & W.Kittr.; Oreorchis patens var. gracillima (Hayata) S.S.Ying; Oreorchis patens subsp. coreana (Finet) Y.N.Lee; Oreorchis patens var. coreana (Finet) M.Kim

= Oreorchis patens =

Species of orchid

Oreorchis patens, the common oreorchis or 山兰 (shan lan), is a species of orchid native to eastern Asia. It is known from Japan, Korea, the Russian Far East, and China. The common oreorchis is a terrestrial orchid with a sympodial habit of growth; it flowers on an inflorescence bearing yellow blooms.

== Description ==
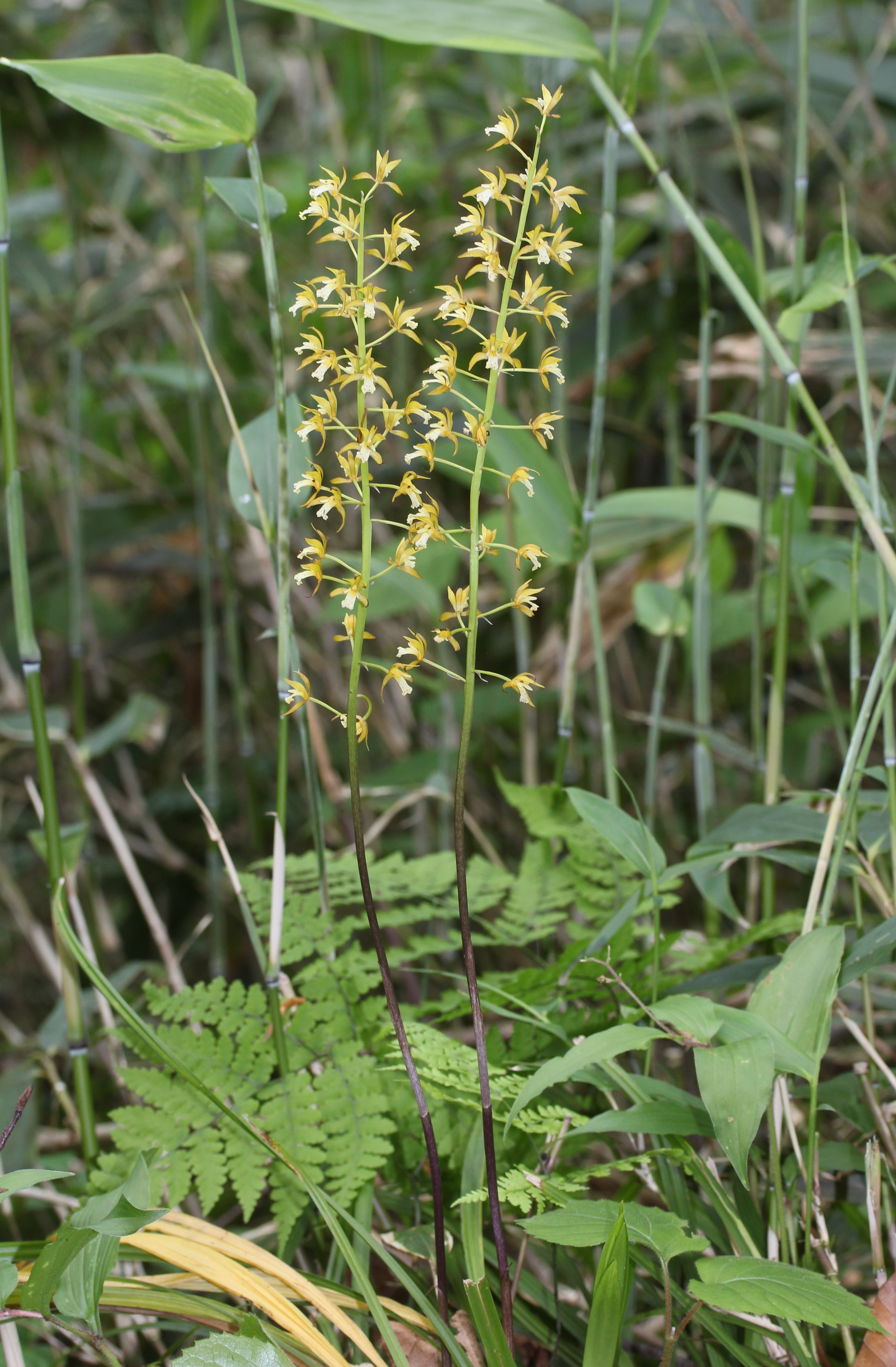
Oreorchis patens in Mount Mominuka, Hida, Gifu prefecture, Japan.

Oreorchis patens is a terrestrial, perennial herb spreading by means of pseudobulbs. Its pseudobulbs are egg-shaped, 1–2 by 0.5–1.5 centimetres (0.39–0.79 by 0.20–0.59 in), and carry two or three nodes that eventually develop into separate growths; the chain of pseudobulbs is connected by a short rhizome. The leaves, 13–30 centimetres (5.1–12 in) in length and 1–2 centimetres (0.39–0.79 in) in width, are usually solitary or may rarely come in pairs, linear or narrowly lanceolate and pleated. They gradually taper at base into an indistinct petiole-like stalk, and are pointed at the apex. The inflorescence is 25–67 centimetres (9.8–26 in) tall with 2 or 3 tubular sheaths below the middle; the rachis is 4–15.5 centimetres (1.6–6.1 in) and may carry laxly few to subdensely many flowers. The floral bracts are narrowly lanceolate, 2.5–5 millimetres (0.098–0.20 in) long. The flowers are yellowish brown to pale yellow, and the lip is white, often with purple spots. The sepals are narrowly oblong, 7–9 by 1.5–2 millimetres (0.28–0.35 by 0.059–0.079 in), with apices slightly blunt; the lateral sepals are slightly curved like a sickle and wider than the dorsal sepal. The petals are narrowly oblong, and slightly curved, 7–8 by 1.5–1.8 millimetres (0.28–0.31 by 0.059–0.071 in), with the apices pointed. Both the sepals and petals have 3-5 veins. The lip is oval-shaped with the base narrower, 6.5–8.5 by 3.5–5 millimetres (0.26–0.33 by 0.14–0.20 in); it is tri-lobed and shortly clawed at base. The lateral lobes of the lip are slightly incurved, linear, around 3 by 0.7 millimetres (0.12 by 0.028 in), the apices blunt; the mid-lobe is oval-shaped, 5.5–7 by 3–5.5 millimetres (0.22–0.28 by 0.12–0.22 in), the apex rounded and irregularly incised. The callus consists of a pair of thick lamellae, extending from base to midway along the mid-lobe. The column is 4–5 millimetres (0.16–0.20 in) long, with the base thickened. The pedicels and ovaries together are 8–12 millimetres (0.31–0.47 in) long, and the capsule is oblong, around 15 by 7 millimetres (0.59 by 0.28 in) long. The plant flowers from June to July, and its capsules ripen from September to October. The diploid number of the species is 2n = 48.

== Taxonomy and naming ==
John Lindley first described the common oreorchis as Corallorhiza patens from a Russian specimen in 1840, noting that its floral structure was similar to that of the mycoheterotrophic genus Corallorhiza but that it possessed leaves. In 1859, he proposed the new genus Oreorchis for this species, along with two other species in his possession, feeling that they were distinct because of the presence of leaves and their globular, uncompressed pollinia attached to a "true caudicle with its gland."

Several other species in the genus were subsequently described, many of which have been subsumed within O. patens. K.Y. Lang (1994) and N. Pearce and P. Cribb (1997) synonymized O. lancifolia and O. setschuanica with O. patens based on their virtually indistinguishable morphology. O. yunnanensis was synonymized based on the type description and habitat; physical specimens were difficult to obtain. O. patens var. confluens was described by Schlechter in 1921 as bearing a lip with convergent keels joined at the apex; Pearce and Cribb treated this feature as a local variation and likewise synonymized it with the parent species. Interestingly, Pearce and Cribb regarded O. gracilis and its synonyms as O. patens var. gracilis based on Taiwanese and Japanese bifoliate individuals. They also challenged the Maekawa (1935) splitting of O. coreana and its synonyms into a separate genus, Diplolabellum, but did not synonymize the species with O. patens. As of 2020, both O. patens var. gracilis and O. coreana are regarded as synonyms of O. patens by Kew.

== Distribution and habitat ==
The common oreorchis is known from Japan, Korea, the Russian Far East (Kamchatka, Primorye, Sakhalin, Kuril Islands), and China (Gansu, Guizhou, Heilongjiang, Henan, Hunan, Jiangxi, Jilin, Liaoning, Sichuan, Taiwan, and Yunnan). It is found in forests, forest margins, thickets, grassy places, and shaded places along valleys at elevations of 1,000–3,000 metres (3,300–9,800 ft). The hoverflies Episyrphus balteatus and Sphaerophoria menthastri have been known to pollinate O. patens.
