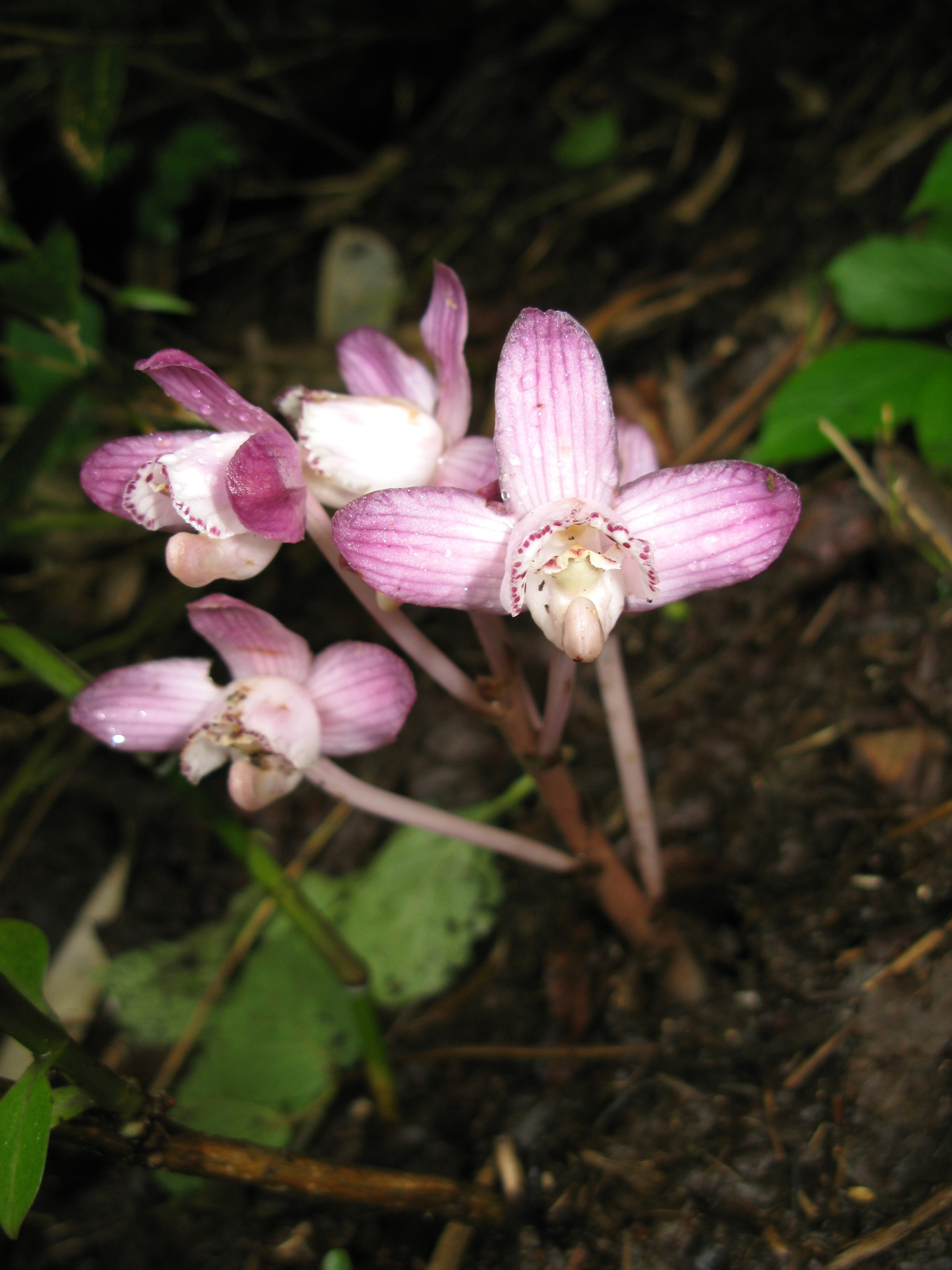
- Yoania japonica

Scientific classification
- Kingdom: Plantae
- Clade: Tracheophytes
- Clade: Angiosperms
- Clade: Monocots
- Order: Asparagales
- Family: Orchidaceae
- Subfamily: Epidendroideae
- Tribe: Epidendreae
- Subtribe: Calypsoinae
- Genus: Yoania; Maxim., 1873

Type species
- Yoania japonica Maxim.

Synonyms
- Yunorchis Z.J.Liu, G.Q.Zhang & M.He Li

= Yoania =

Genus of orchids

Yoania is a genus of flowering plants from the orchid family, Orchidaceae. It described in 1872 by Russian botanist Karl Maximovich and was named after Japanese polymath and botanist Udagawa Yōan.

== Distribution ==
This genus is mainly distributed in Japan, but Y. japonica is also found in India (Assam), China, and Taiwan and Y. prainii is found in the Himalayas and in northern Vietnam.

== Species ==
Species recognized as of November 2020:

Image	Scientific name	Distribution
	Yoania amagiensis Nakai & F.Maek, 1931	Honshu, Kyushu
	Yoania flava K.Inoue & T.Yukawa, 2002	Honshu
	Yoania japonica Maxim., 1873	Assam, Fujian, Jiangxi, Taiwan, Japan
	Yoania pingbianensis Z.J.Liu, G.Q.Zhang & M.He Li, 2016	Yunnan, Vietnam
	Yoania prainii King & Pantl.,1898	Sikkim, Assam, northeastern India, Vietnam

Species formerly included:

- Yoania aberrans Finet, 1900: synonym of Cymbidium macrorhizon Lindl., 1833
- Yoania australis Hatch, 1963: synonym of Danhatchia australis (Hatch) Garay & Christenson, 1995

== See also ==
- List of Orchidaceae genera
