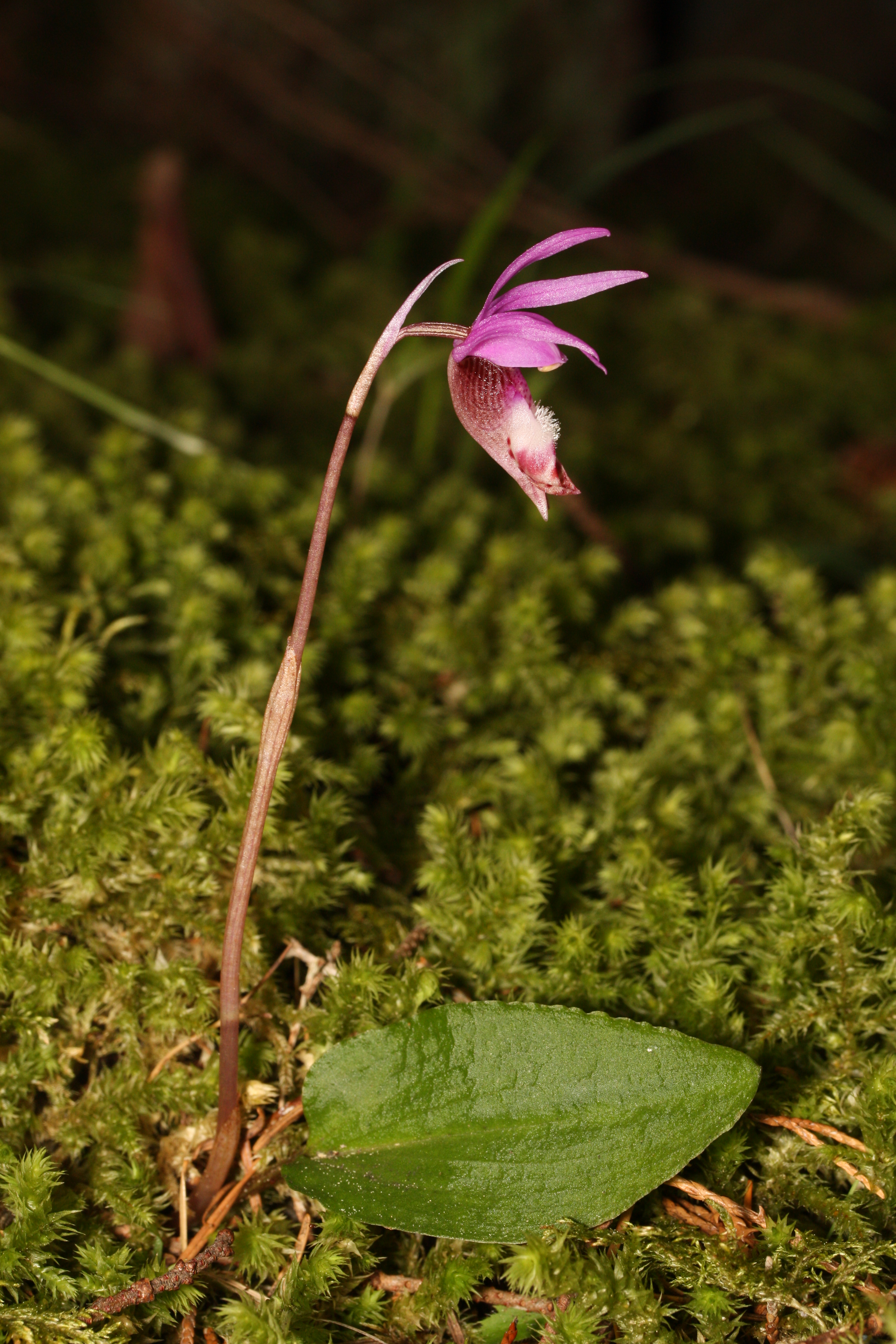
- Calypso bulbosa, in Anacortes, Washington (state)

Conservation status
- Secure (NatureServe)

Scientific classification
- Kingdom: Plantae
- Clade: Tracheophytes
- Clade: Angiosperms
- Clade: Monocots
- Order: Asparagales
- Family: Orchidaceae
- Subfamily: Epidendroideae
- Tribe: Epidendreae
- Subtribe: Calypsoinae
- Genus: Calypso; Salisb.
- Species: C. bulbosa

Binomial name
- Calypso bulbosa (L.) Oakes

Varieties
- C. b. var. americana; C. b. var. bulbosa; C. b. var. occidentalis; C. b. var. speciosa

Synonyms
- List: Calypso borealis Salisb.; Calypsodium boreale Link; Cymbidium boreale Sw.; Cypripedium bulbosum L.; Cytherea borealis Salisb.; Cytherea bulbosa (L.) House; Limodorum boreale Sw.; Norna borealis Wahlenb.; Norna borealis var. europaea Wahlenb.; Orchidium arcticum Sw.; Orchidium boreale Sw.

= Calypso bulbosa =

Species of orchid

Calypso is a genus of orchids containing one species, Calypso bulbosa, known as the calypso orchid, fairy slipper or Venus's slipper. It is a perennial member of the orchid family found in undisturbed northern and montane forests. It has a small pink, purple, pinkish-purple, or red flower accented with a white lip, darker purple spottings, and yellow beard. The genus Calypso takes its name from the Greek signifying concealment, as they tend to favor sheltered areas on conifer forest floors. The specific epithet, bulbosa, refers to the bulb-like corms.

== Description ==
Calypso bulbosa is a low growing herbaceous plant with a nearly egg-shaped underground storage organ called a corm. It is encased in dead leaf sheaths and has elongated roots. Calypso orchids are typically 8 to 20 cm in height. Plants have a single leaf that measures 1 to 6.5 centimeters long with a width of 1.2 to 5.2 cm. The leaf is suborbiculate, nearly circular, or ovate, egg shaped in outline. The base of the leaf is often cordate, having an indentation like the top of a heart. The leaf often has a very long petiole, a leaf stalk attaching it to the plant. The leaf sprouts in the autumn and remains green over the winter. It withers a short time after flowering.

Plant blooms with a purple-pink hermaphroditic, zygomorphic and threefold flower. The protruding petals and sepals are pink to purple in color, about 10 to 12 millimeters long and about 2 to 4 millimeters wide. The lip (labellum) is white to pink with pink or yellow spots. It has a wide, shoe-shaped cavity in the back and is about 15 to 25 millimeters long. They do not bloom until May and June usually after snow melt. A new bulb is formed by the plant each year, but bulbs from one or two years prior can remain attached and firm. Plants seldom live for longer than five years.

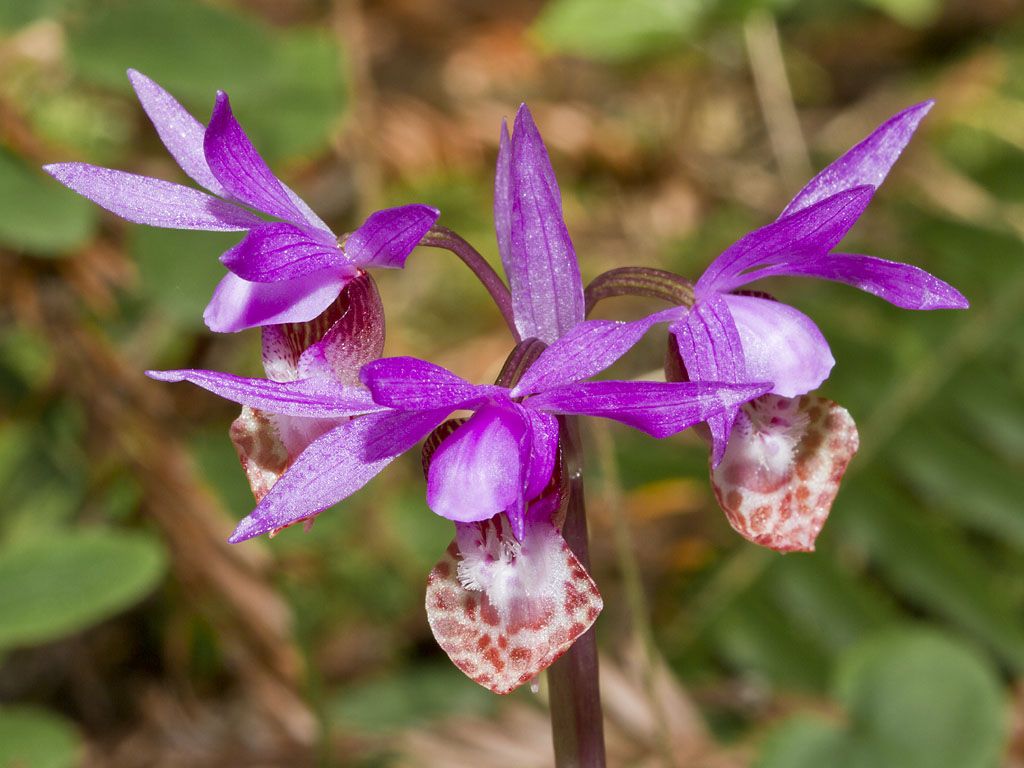
Flowers

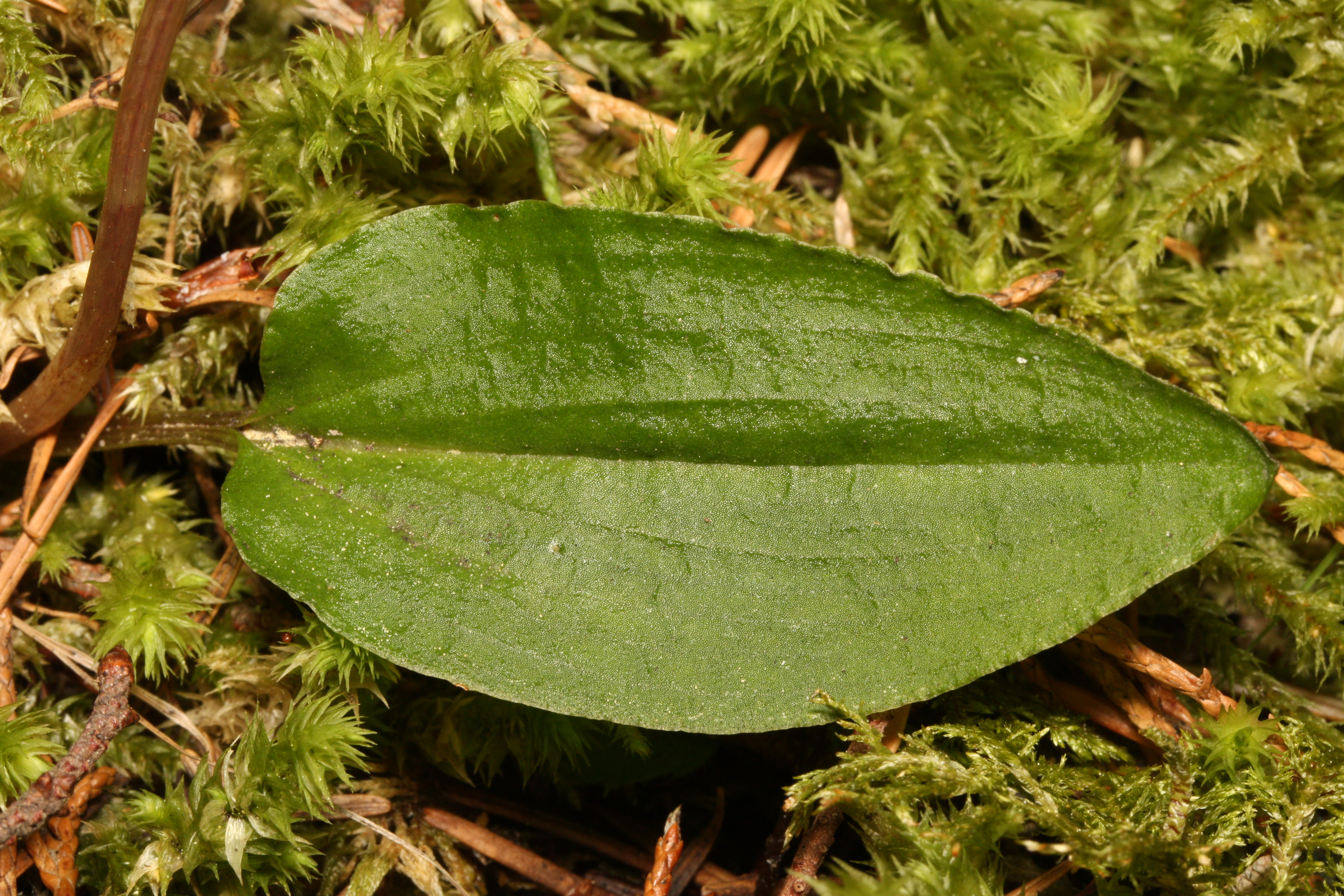
Leaf Top

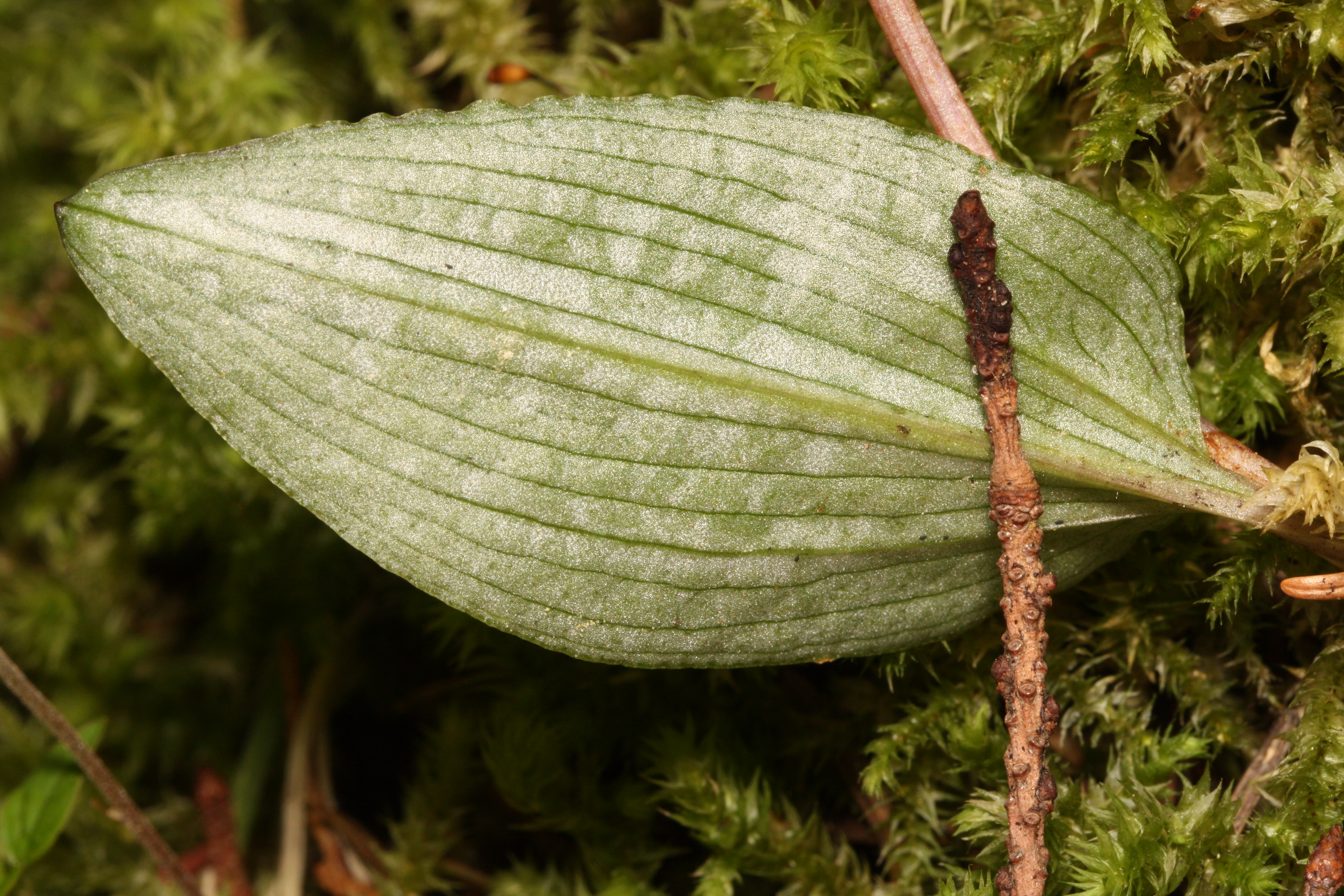
Leaf underside

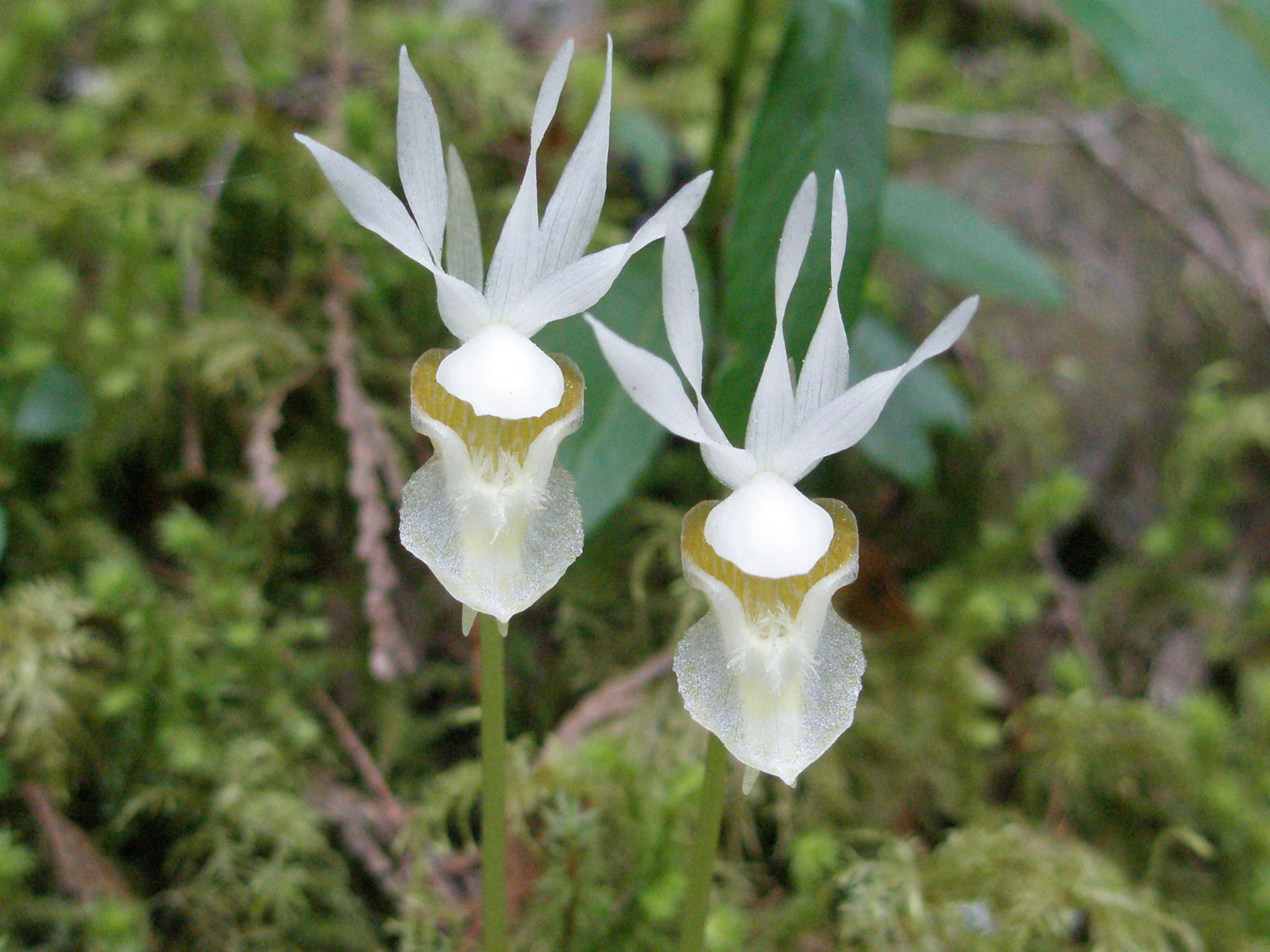
White form of Calypso bulbosa var. occidentalis

== Taxonomy and systematics ==
The chromosome count is 2n = 28. Since the orchid seed does not provide any nutrient tissue, germination only takes place when infected by a mycorrhizal root fungus.

=== Taxonomy ===
The accepted generic name Calypso Salisb was described in 1808 by the English gardener Richard Anthony Salisbury in the work Paradisus Londinensis. It was published with the then-director of the Royal Botanic Gardens in London, William Jackson Hooker (1785–1865). In 1905, Homer Doliver House proposed that the genus be renamed as Cytherea because of the earlier publication of Calypso by Louis-Marie Aubert du Petit-Thouars 1804, regarded as a synonym of Salacia. In 1930 it was made a conserved name by the International Botanical Congress.

The following generic names have been published as synonyms:

- Cytherea Salisb. (1812)
- Orchidium Sw. (1814)
- Calypsodium Link (1829)
- Norna Wahlenb. (1833)

Calypso bulbosa was assigned to the genus Cypripedium in 1753 by Carl von Linné in Species Plantarum. It was moved to the genus Calypso by the botanist William Oakes 1842.

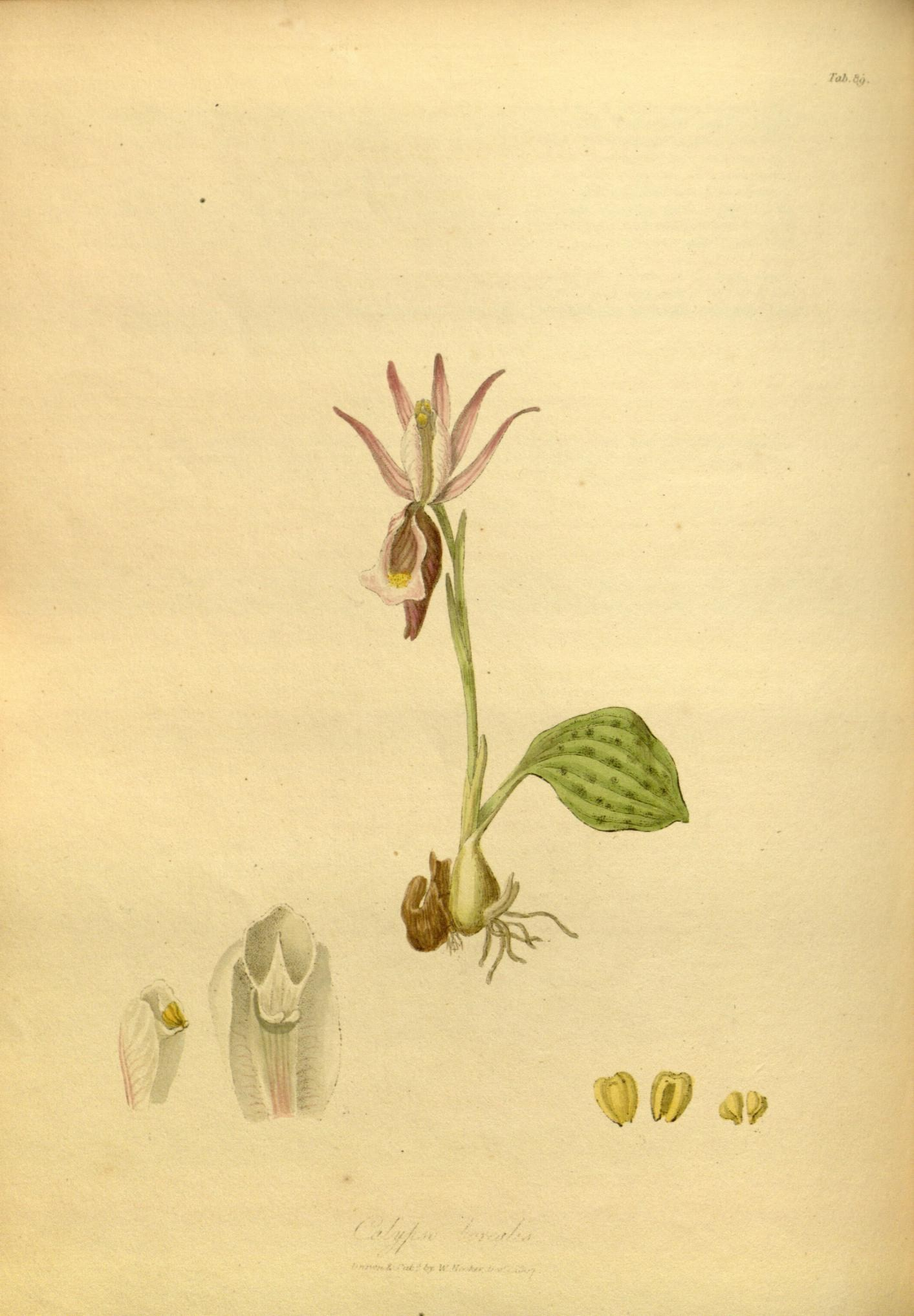
C. bulbosa in "Paradisus Londinensis"

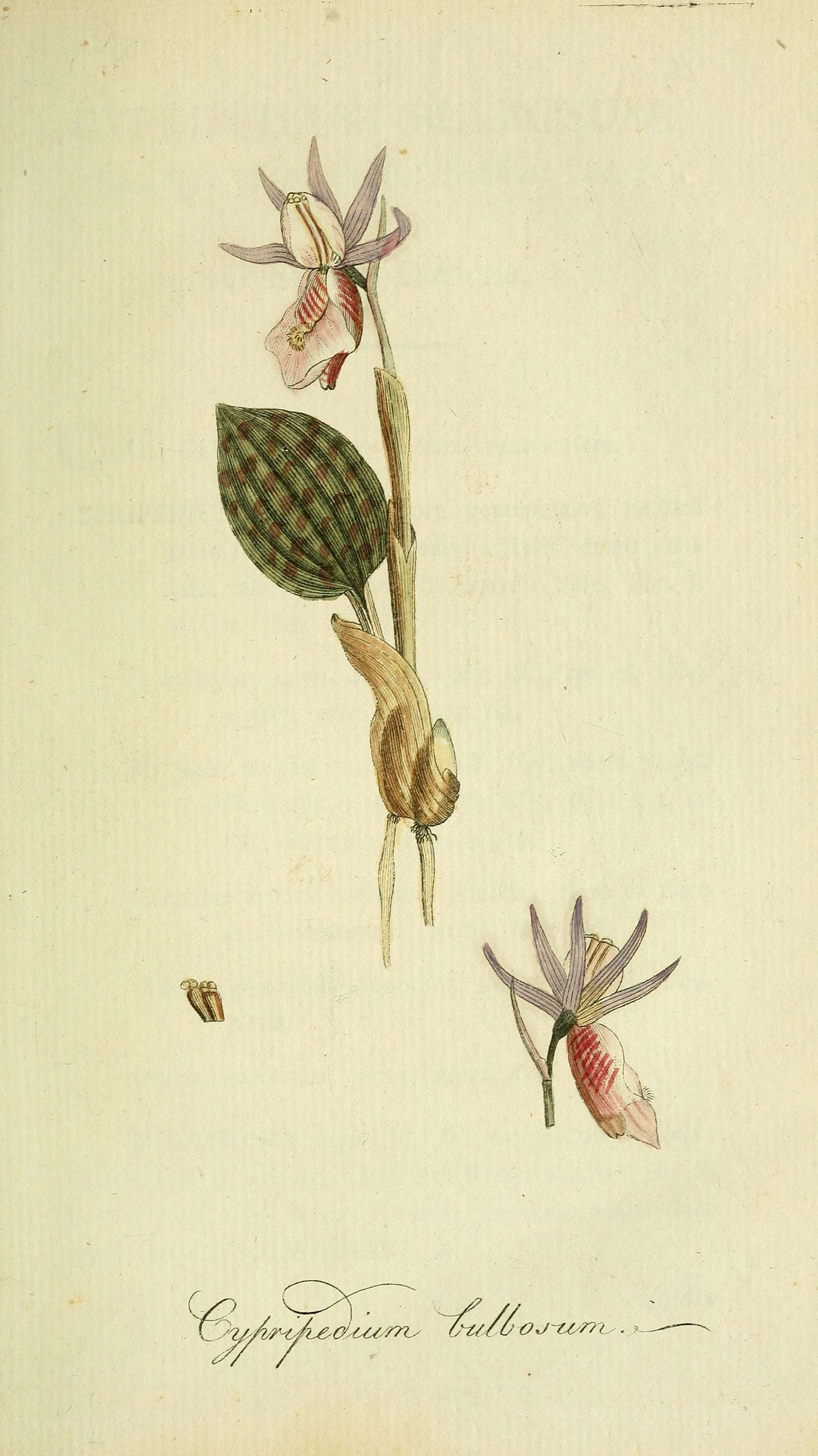
Illustration of Calypso bulbosa as Cypripedium bulbosum by Johann Jacob Roemer in Flora Europaea inchoata (1797)

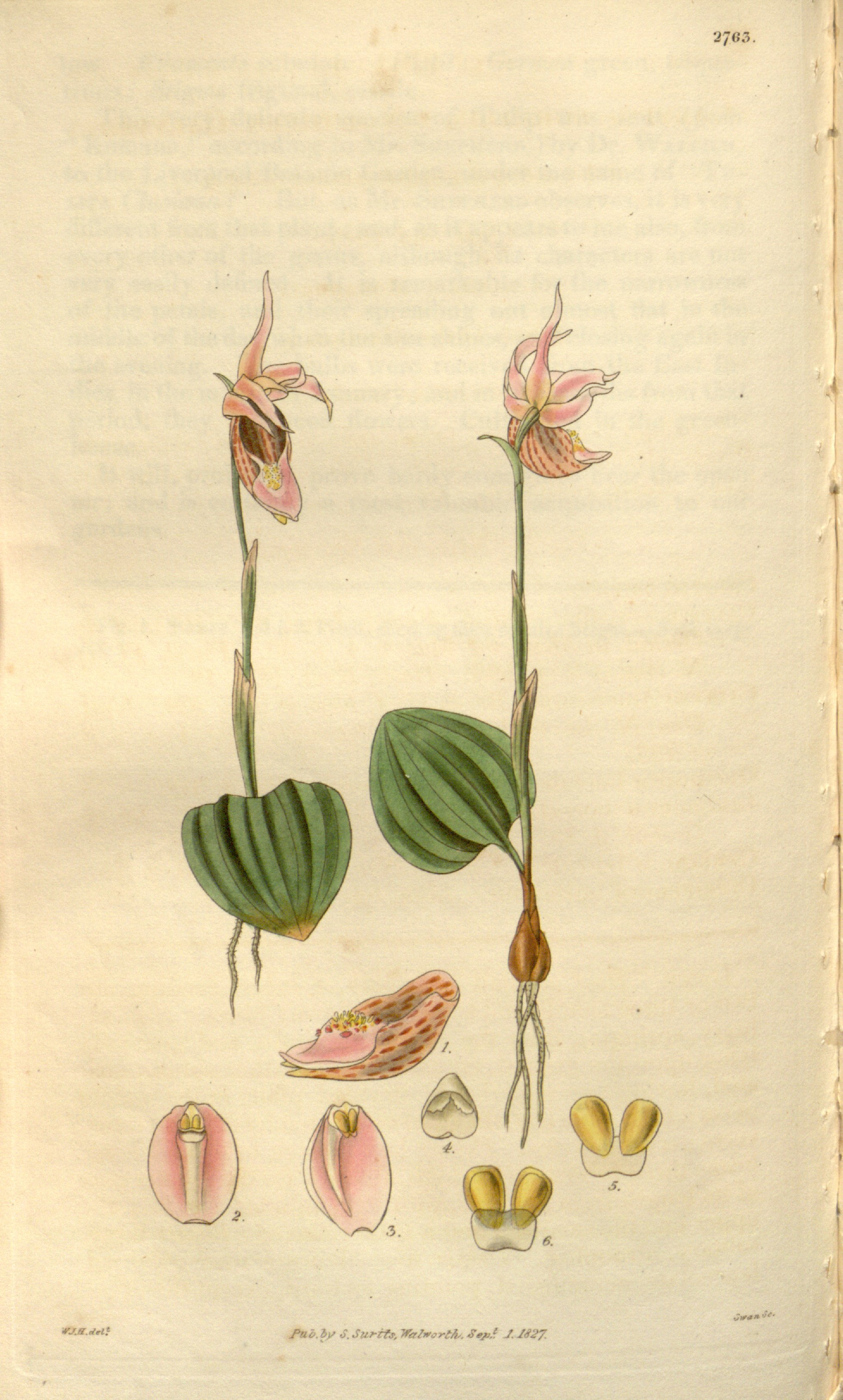
Illustration of Calypso bulbosa (as syn. Calypso borealis) in "Curtis's Botanical Magazine" vol.54 (N.S. 1) pl. 2763 (1827)

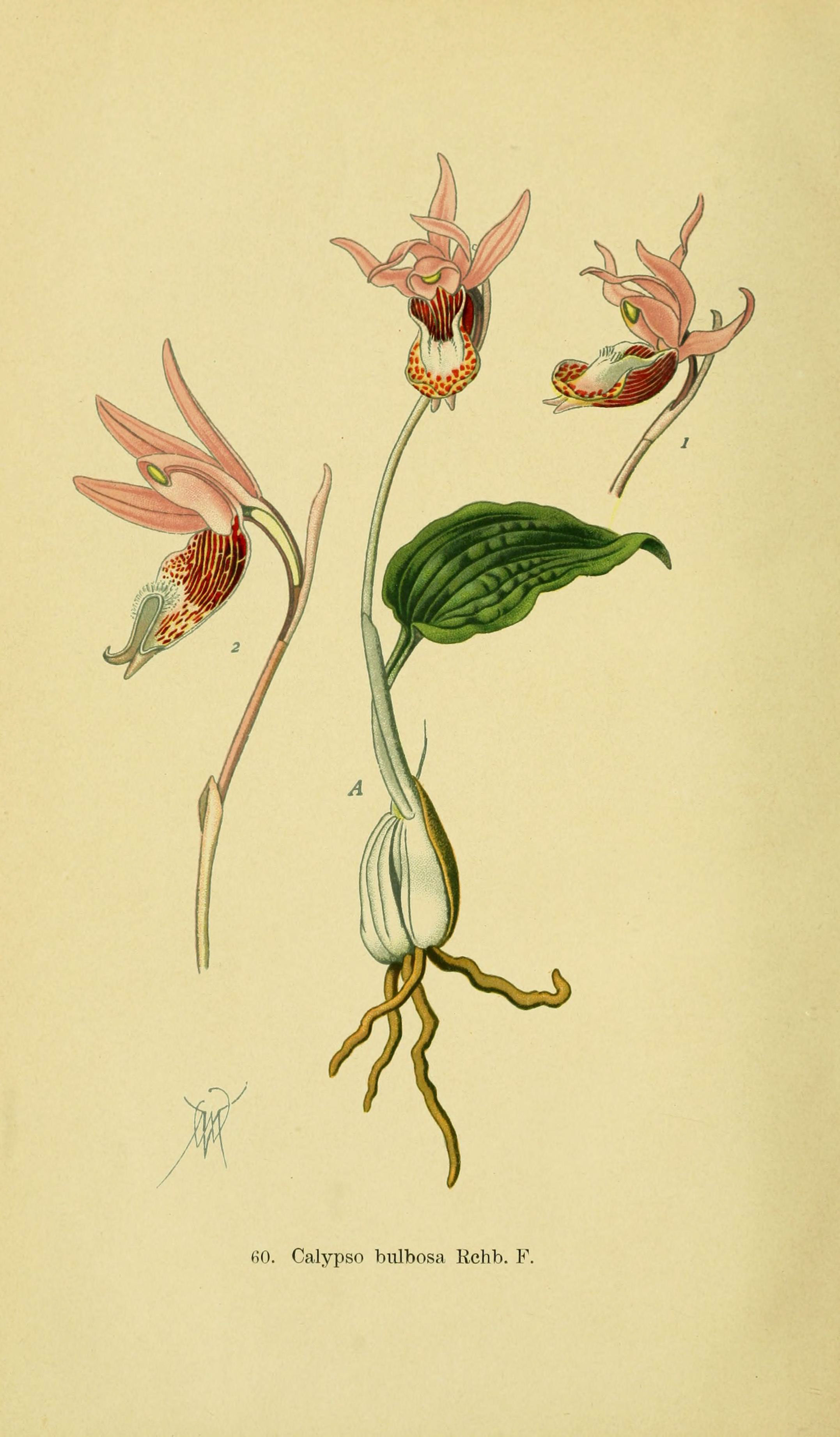
Calypso bulbosa Rchb. F. by Kränzlin, Friedrich; Müller, Walter in Abbildungen der in Deutschland und den angrenzenden gebieten vorkommenden grundformen der orchideenarten (1904)

Varieties

Four varieties and one nothovariety, a variety of hybrid origin that is established in the wild, are recognized:

Image	Variety	Distribution
	Calypso bulbosa var. americana (R.Br.) Luer	most of Canada, western and northern United States
	Calypso bulbosa var. bulbosa	Sweden, Finland, Baltic States, much of Russia, Mongolia, Korea
	Calypso bulbosa nothovar. kostiukiae Catling	Alberta (C. bulbosa var. americana × C. bulbosa var. occidentalis)
	Calypso bulbosa var. occidentalis (Holz.) Cockerell	from Alaska and British Columbia south through the Cascades, Rockies, and Sierra Nevada to California
	Calypso bulbosa var. speciosa (Schltr.) Makino	Japan, China (Gansu, Jilin, Nei Mongol, Sichuan, Tibet, Yunnan)

=== Synonyms ===
Calypso bulbosa has 29 synonyms of the species or one of its four varieties, including 16 species.

Table of Synonyms
Name	Year	Rank	Synonym of:	Notes
Calypso americana R.Br.	1813	species	var. americana	≡ hom.
Calypso borealis Salisb.	1808	species	C. bulbosa	≡ hom., nom. superfl.
Calypso bulbosa f. albiflora P.M.Br.	1995	form	var. americana	= het.
Calypso bulbosa subsp. americana (R.Br.) A.Haines	2010	subspecies	var. americana	≡ hom.
Calypso bulbosa f. americana (R.Br.) P.M.Br.	1995	form	var. americana	≡ hom.
Calypso bulbosa f. biflora P.M.Br.	2004	form	var. americana	= het.
Calypso bulbosa f. candida Hyl.	1945	form	var. bulbosa	= het.
Calypso bulbosa f. nivea P.M.Br.	1995	form	var. occidentalis	= het.
Calypso bulbosa subsp. occidentalis (Holz.) Calder & Roy L.Taylor	1963	subspecies	var. occidentalis	≡ hom.
Calypso bulbosa f. occidentalis Holz.	1895	form	var. occidentalis	≡ hom.
Calypso bulbosa f. rosea P.M.Br.	1995	form	var. americana	= het.
Calypso occidentalis (Holz.) A.Heller	1898	species	var. occidentalis	≡ hom.
Calypso speciosa Schltr.	1919	species	var. speciosa	≡ hom.
Calypsodium boreale Link	1829	species	C. bulbosa	≡ hom., nom. superfl.
Cymbidium boreale Sw.	1799	species	C. bulbosa	≡ hom., nom. superfl.
Cypripedium bulbosum L.	1753	species	C. bulbosa	≡ hom.
Cytherea borealis Salisb.	1812	species	C. bulbosa	≡ hom., nom. superfl.
Cytherea bulbosa (L.) House	1905	species	C. bulbosa	≡ hom.
Cytherea bulbosa var. occidentalis (Holz.) Cockerell	1915	variety	var. occidentalis	≡ hom.
Cytherea occidentalis (Holz.) A.Heller	1906	species	var. occidentalis	≡ hom.
Cytherea speciosa (Schltr.) Makino	1929	species	var. speciosa	≡ hom.
Limodorum boreale Sw.	1805	species	C. bulbosa	≡ hom., nom. superfl.
Norna borealis Wahlenb.	1833	species	C. bulbosa	≡ hom., nom. superfl.
Norna borealis var. americana (R.Br.) Wahlenb.	1826	variety	var. americana	≡ hom.
Norna borealis var. asiatica Wahlenb.	1826	variety	var. bulbosa	= het.
Norna borealis var. europaea Wahlenb.	1826	variety	C. bulbosa	≡ hom., not validly publ.
Orchidium americanum (R.Br.) Steud.	1841	species	var. americana	≡ hom.
Orchidium arcticum Sw.	1814	species	C. bulbosa	≡ hom., not validly publ.
Orchidium boreale Sw.	1816	species	C. bulbosa	≡ hom., nom. superfl.
Notes: ≡ homotypic synonym; = heterotypic synonym

=== Names ===
The genus Calypso is named in reference to the nymph Calypso, whose name means concealment. The habitat of these plants in the deep woods habitat metaphorically hides them from plant hunters. The species name, bulbosa, means possessing a bulb, referring to its growth habit. Calypso bulbosa is known by the common names fairy slipper, fairyslipper orchid, and fairy-slipper orchid, due to the prominent lower lip of the flower resembling a slipper. Similarly it is known as Venus slipper or Venus' slipper, but this name is also applied to orchids of the genus Cypripedium because of the mythological association with the goddess Venus. It is also known as angel slipper, slipper orchid, redwoods orchid, deer-head orchid, and calypso.

== Range and habitat ==
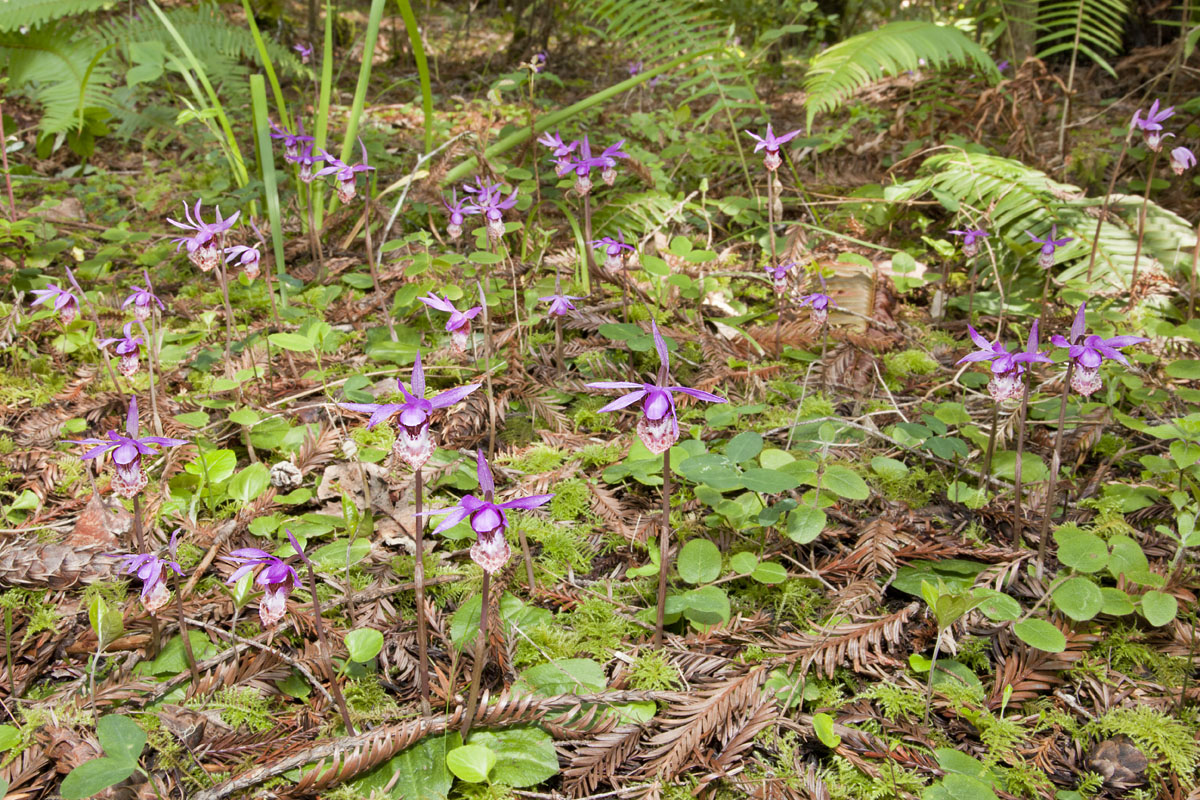
Calypso bulbosa in Mendocino County, CA

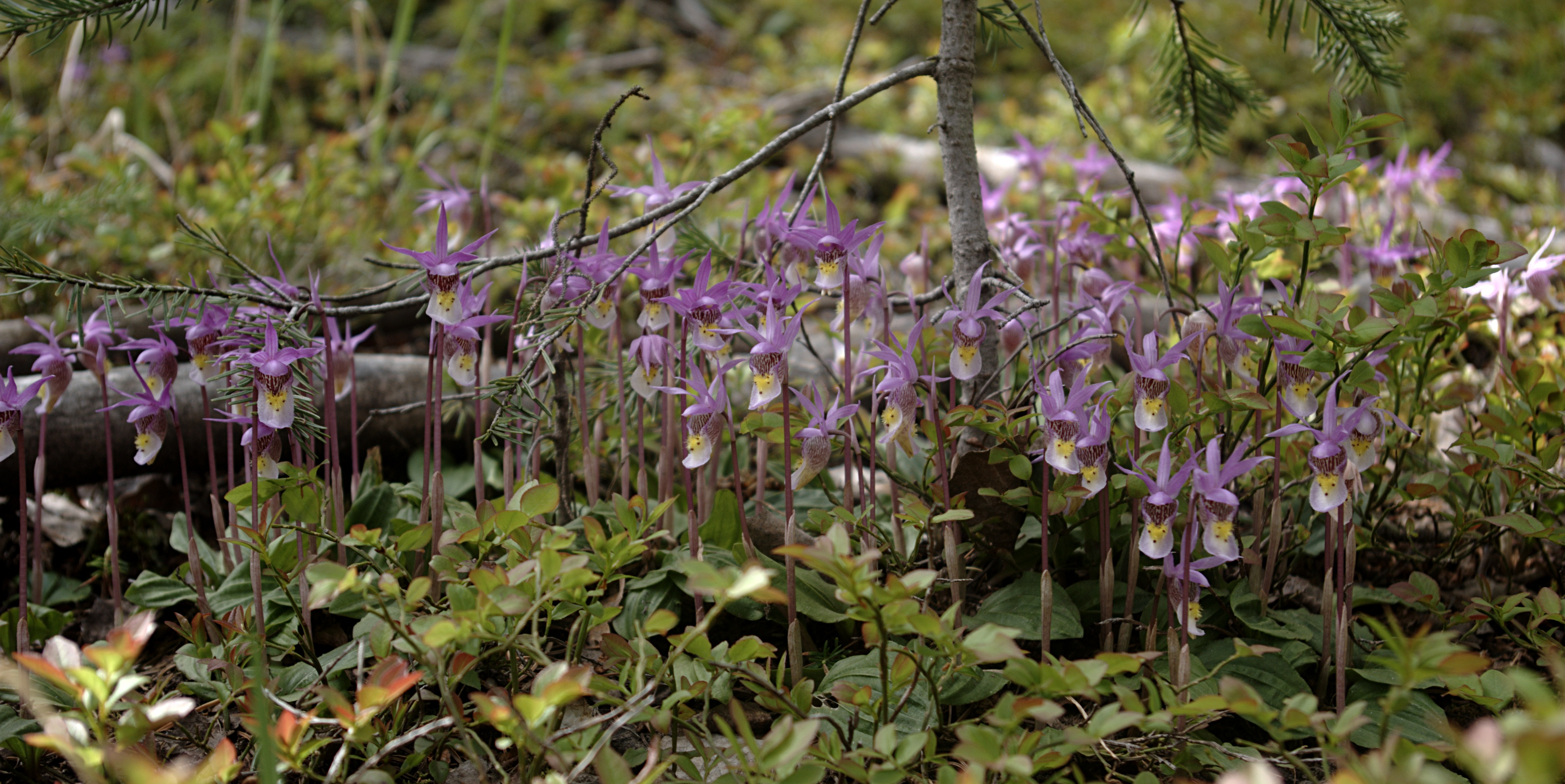
Calypso bulbosa var. americana, in bloom, Winsor Trail, Santa Fe County, New Mexico.

This species' range is circumpolar, extending around the northern hemisphere. In Europe this includes just Sweden, Finland, the Baltic states, and the northern parts of European Russia. It includes California, the Rocky Mountain states and most of the most northerly states of the United States; most of Canada; China, Mongolia, Korea and Japan—see external links for map. It is found in subarctic swamps and marshes as well as shady places subarctic coniferous forests.

=== Conservation ===
Although the calypso orchid's distribution is wide, it is very susceptible to disturbance. The conservation organization NatureServe evaluated the species in 2025 and found it to be secure at the global level (G5). However, in the United States they found it to be vulnerable (S3) in Arizona, Wyoming, South Dakota, Minnesota, and Maine. In two other states, Wisconsin and Michigan, they rated it as imperiled (S2). In Canada it also is rated as vulnerable in Saskatchewan and the Yukon Territory and imperiled in New Brunswick. More critically it is critically imperiled (S1) on the Island of Newfoundland and possibly locally extinct in Nunavut.

In Sweden it was listed as vulnerable in the 2020 Swedish Red List. Similarly, Finland evaluated it as vulnerable in the 2019 national Red Book.

== Ecology ==
At least near Banff, Alberta, the calypso orchid is pollinated by bumble bees (Bombus (Pyrobombus) and B. Psithyrus). It relies on "pollination by deception", as it attracts insects to anther-like yellow hairs at the entrance to the pouch and forked nectary-like structures at the end of the pouch but produces no nectar that would nourish them. Insects quickly learn not to revisit it. Avoiding such recognition may account for some of the small variation in the flower's appearance.

== Uses ==
Attempts at garden cultivation are not successful and transplanting usually will kill plants. The structure of the corms suggest that the species is dependent on mycorrhizal relationships with soil funguses that are lost during transplantation. The corms have been used as a food source by North American native peoples. The Nlaka'pamux of British Columbia used it as a treatment for mild epilepsy.
