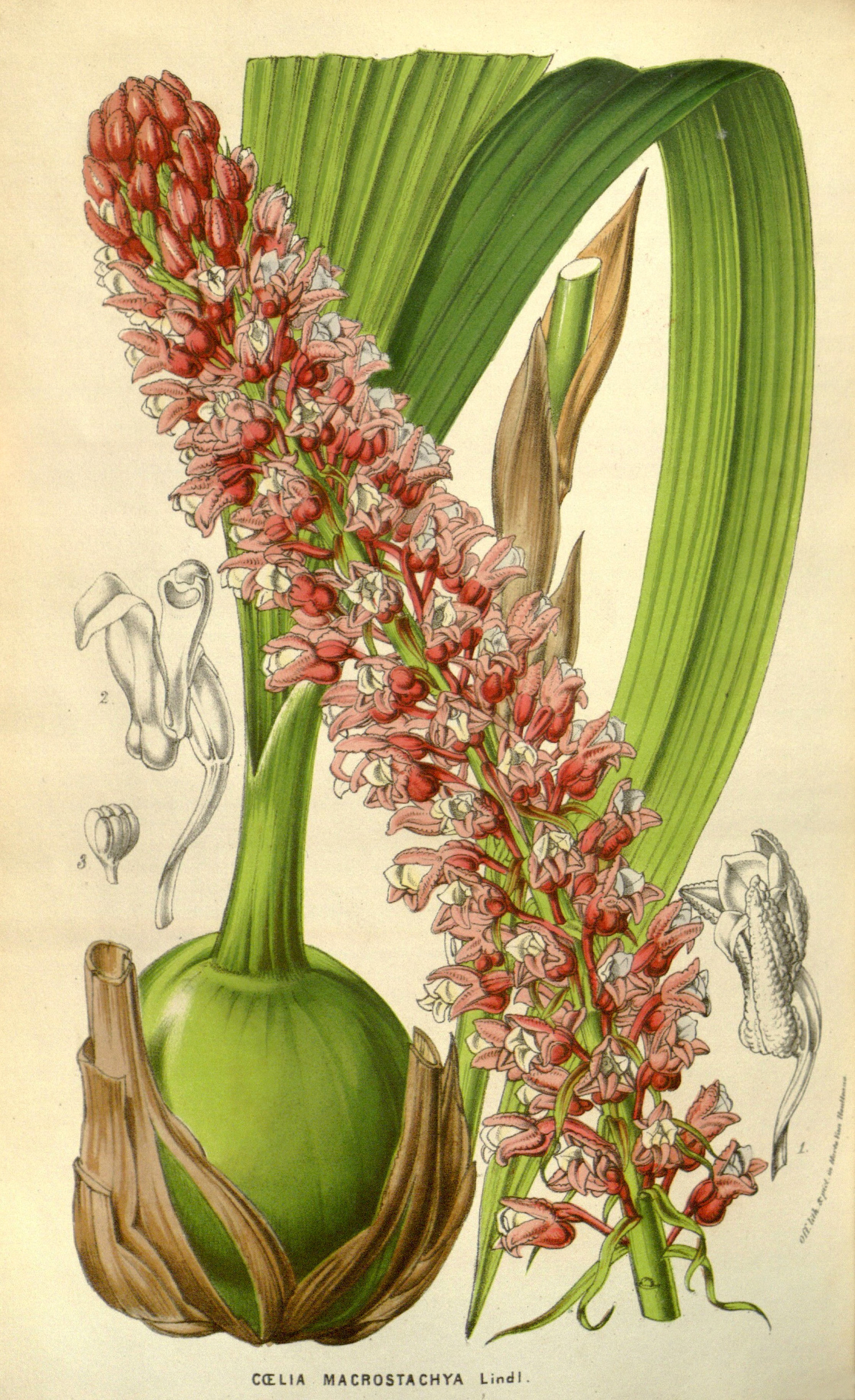
- Coelia macrostachya

Scientific classification
- Kingdom: Plantae
- Clade: Tracheophytes
- Clade: Angiosperms
- Clade: Monocots
- Order: Asparagales
- Family: Orchidaceae
- Subfamily: Epidendroideae
- Tribe: Epidendreae
- Subtribe: Calypsoinae
- Genus: Coelia; Lindl.

Synonyms
- Bothriochilus Lem.

= Coelia =

Genus of orchids

Coelia is a genus of orchids (family Orchidaceae, tribe Epidendreae, subtribe Calypsoinae). It had previously been tentatively classified as the only genus of the subtribe Coeliinae of the tribe Epidendreae.

== Species ==
It contains 5 species, native to Mexico, Central America and the West Indies.

Image	Scientific name	Distribution
	Coelia bella (Lem.) Rchb. f.	Chiapas, Belize, Guatemala, Honduras, Costa Rica
	Coelia densiflora Rolfe	Chiapas, Guatemala, Honduras, El Salvador
	Coelia guatemalensis Rchb.f. in W.G.Walpers	Chiapas, Guatemala, Honduras, El Salvador
	Coelia macrostachya Lindl. in G.Bentham	Chiapas, Guatemala, Honduras, El Salvador, Panama, Guerrero, Oaxaca, Veracruz
	Coelia triptera (Sm.) G.Don ex Steud.	Chiapas, Veracruz, Oaxaca, Puebla, Tabasco, Guatemala, Cuba, Jamaica, Puerto Rico
