= Danxiaorchis =

Scientific classification
- Kingdom: Plantae
- Clade: Tracheophytes
- Clade: Angiosperms
- Clade: Monocots
- Order: Asparagales
- Family: Orchidaceae
- Subfamily: Epidendroideae
- Tribe: Epidendreae
- Subtribe: Calypsoinae
- Genus: Danxiaorchis; J.W.Zhai, F.W.Xing & Z.J.Liu

Genus of flowering plants

Danxiaorchis is a genus of flowering plants belonging to the family Orchidaceae.

Its native range is Southeastern China.

Species:

- Danxiaorchis singchiana J.W.Zhai, F.W.Xing & Z.J.Liu
- Danxiaorchis yangii Bo Y.Yang & Bo Li
