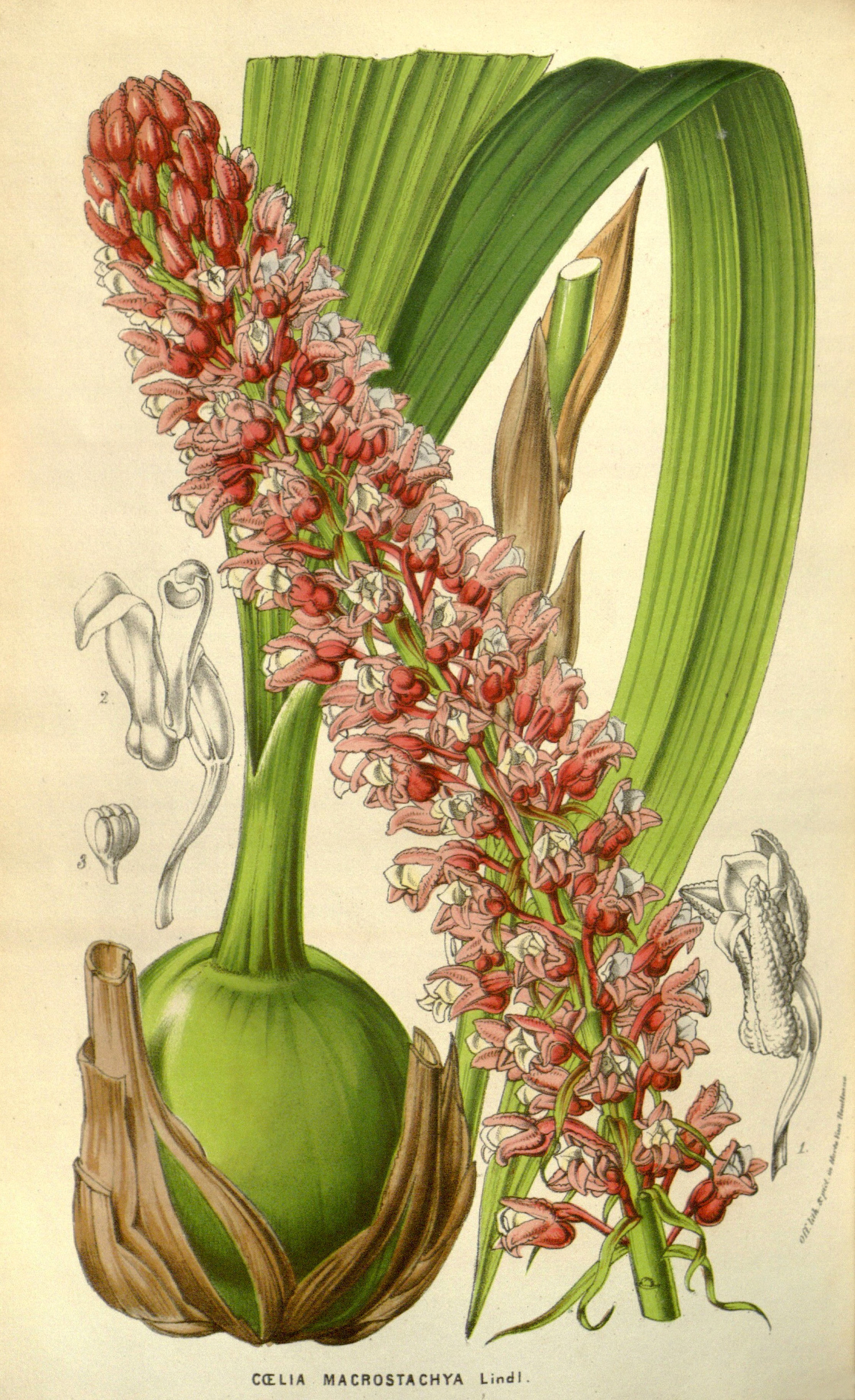
- 1853 illustration from Flore des serres et des jardins de l'Europe

Scientific classification
- Kingdom: Plantae
- Clade: Tracheophytes
- Clade: Angiosperms
- Clade: Monocots
- Order: Asparagales
- Family: Orchidaceae
- Subfamily: Epidendroideae
- Genus: Coelia
- Species: C. macrostachya

Binomial name
- Coelia macrostachya Lindl. (1842)

Synonyms
- Coelia macrostachya var. genuina Rchb.f.; Coelia macrostachya var. integrilabia Rchb.f.; Bothriochilus macrostachyus (Lindl.) L.O. Williams (1940)

= Coelia macrostachya =

Species of orchid

Coelia macrostachya is a species of orchid. It is native to Chiapas, Guatemala, Honduras, El Salvador, Panama, Guerrero, Oaxaca, Veracruz.
