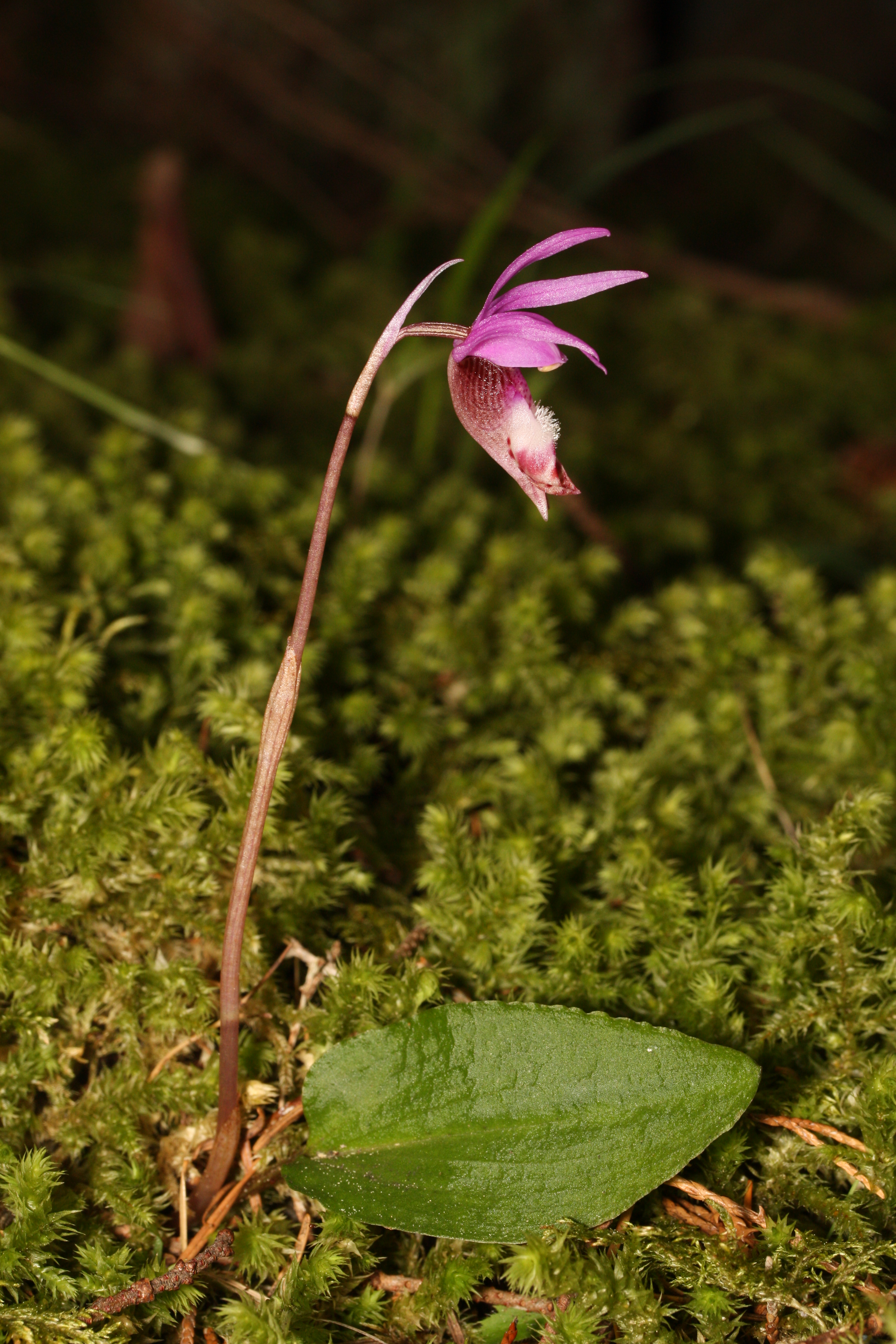
- Calypso bulbosa

Scientific classification
- Kingdom: Plantae
- Clade: Tracheophytes
- Clade: Angiosperms
- Clade: Monocots
- Order: Asparagales
- Family: Orchidaceae
- Subfamily: Epidendroideae
- Tribe: Epidendreae
- Subtribe: Calypsoinae; E.G.Camus

Type genus
- Calypso Salisb.

Genera
- See text

Synonyms
- Calypsoeae Dressler, Selbyana 5: 204. (1979)

= Calypsoinae =

Subtribe of orchids

Calypsoinae is an orchid subtribe in the tribe Epidendreae of subfamily Epidendroideae. It has previously been recognized as tribe Calypsoeae in the subfamily Epidendroideae.

== Genera ==
Genera recognized in Chase et al.'s 2015 classification of Orchidaceae:

- Aplectrum
- Calypso
- Changnienia
- Coelia
- Corallorhiza
- Cremastra
- Dactylostalix
- Danxiaorchis
- Ephippianthus
- Govenia
- Oreorchis
- Tipularia
- Yoania

== See also ==
- Taxonomy of the Orchidaceae
