= Andreettaea catoxys =

Scientific classification
- Kingdom: Plantae
- Clade: Tracheophytes
- Clade: Angiosperms
- Clade: Monocots
- Order: Asparagales
- Family: Orchidaceae
- Subfamily: Epidendroideae
- Tribe: Epidendreae
- Subtribe: Pleurothallidinae
- Genus: Andreettaea
- Species: A. catoxys

Binomial name
- Andreettaea catoxys (Luer & Hirtz) A.Doucette

Synonyms
- Muscarella catoxys (Luer & Hirtz) Luer; Pleurothallis catoxys Luer & Hirtz (1996) (basionym); Specklinia catoxys (Luer & Hirtz) Luer

Species of plant

Andreettaea catoxys is a species of flowering plant in the orchid family. It is an epiphyte native to endemic to Pastaza Province in eastern Ecuador.
