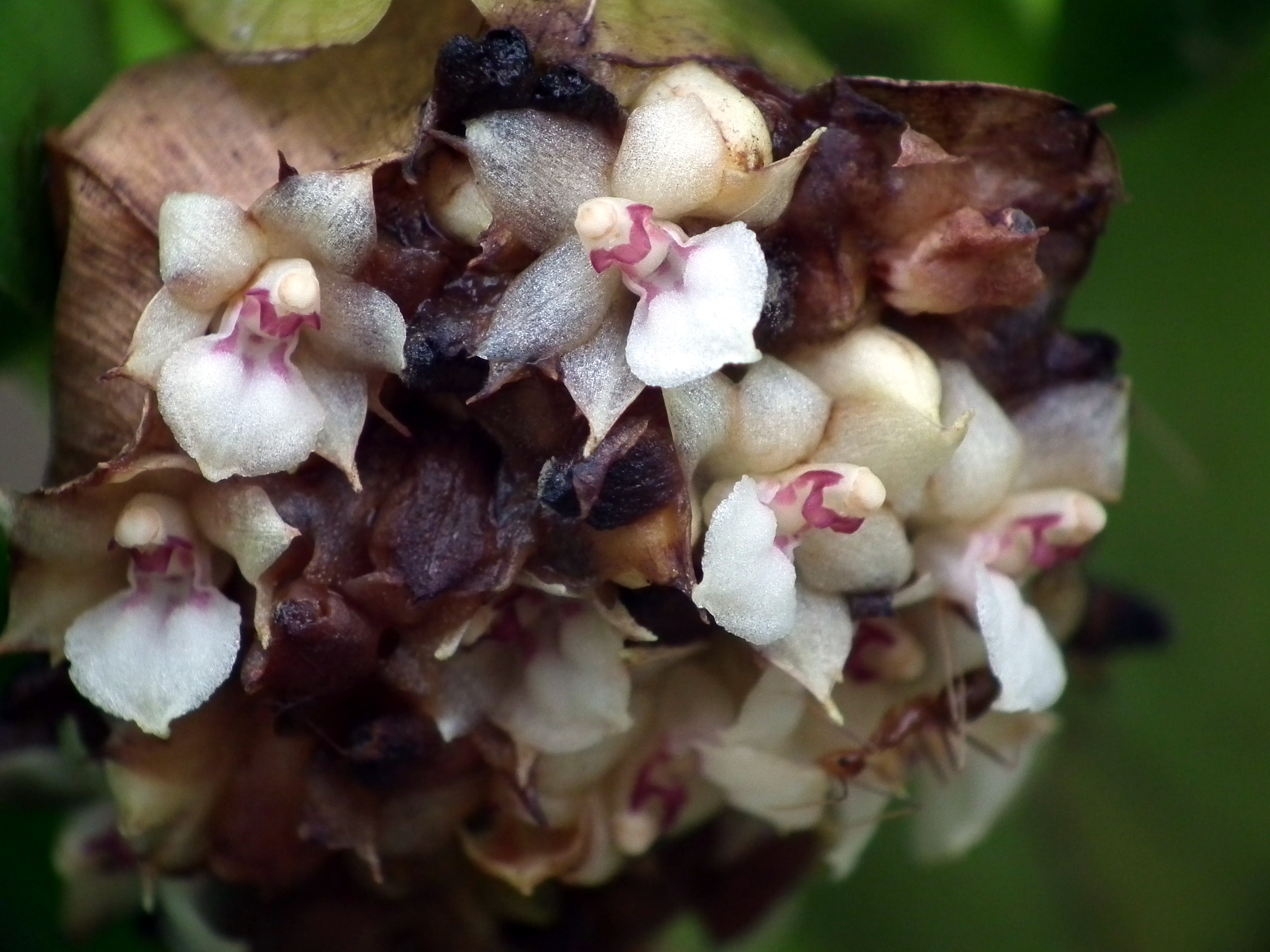
- Agrostophyllum philippinense

Scientific classification
- Kingdom: Plantae
- Clade: Tracheophytes
- Clade: Angiosperms
- Clade: Monocots
- Order: Asparagales
- Family: Orchidaceae
- Subfamily: Epidendroideae
- Tribe: Epidendreae
- Subtribe: Agrostophyllinae; Szlach., (1995)

Genera
- Agrostophyllum; Earina

= Agrostophyllinae =

Subtribe of orchids

Agrostophyllinae is an orchid subtribe in the tribe Epidendreae.
