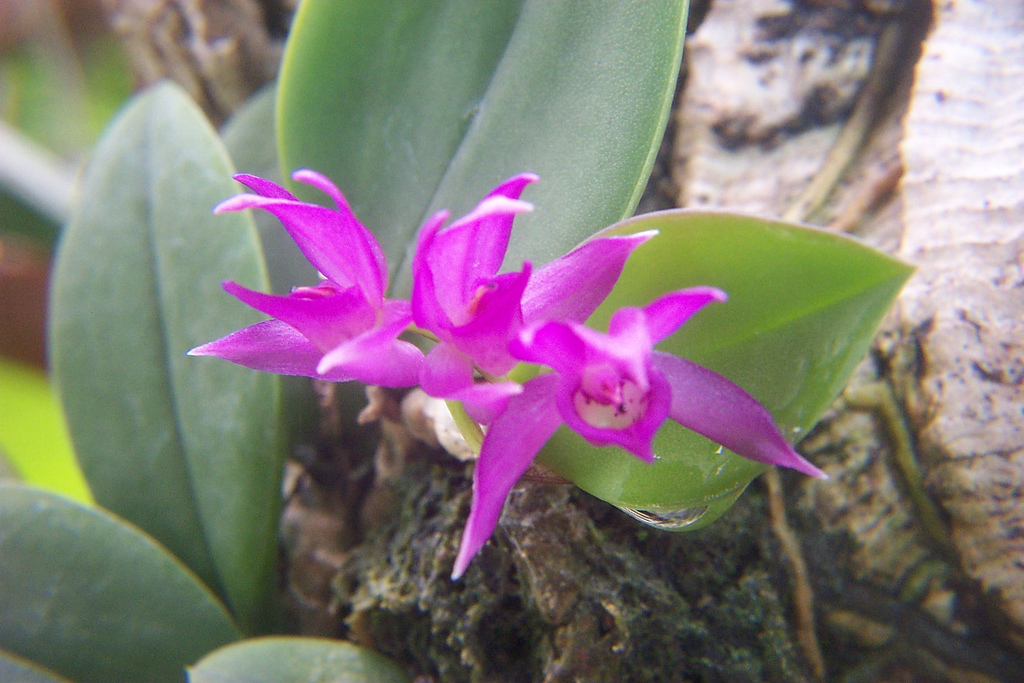
- Meiracyllium trinasutum

Scientific classification
- Kingdom: Plantae
- Clade: Tracheophytes
- Clade: Angiosperms
- Clade: Monocots
- Order: Asparagales
- Family: Orchidaceae
- Subfamily: Epidendroideae
- Tribe: Epidendreae
- Subtribe: Laeliinae
- Genus: Meiracyllium; Rchb.f.
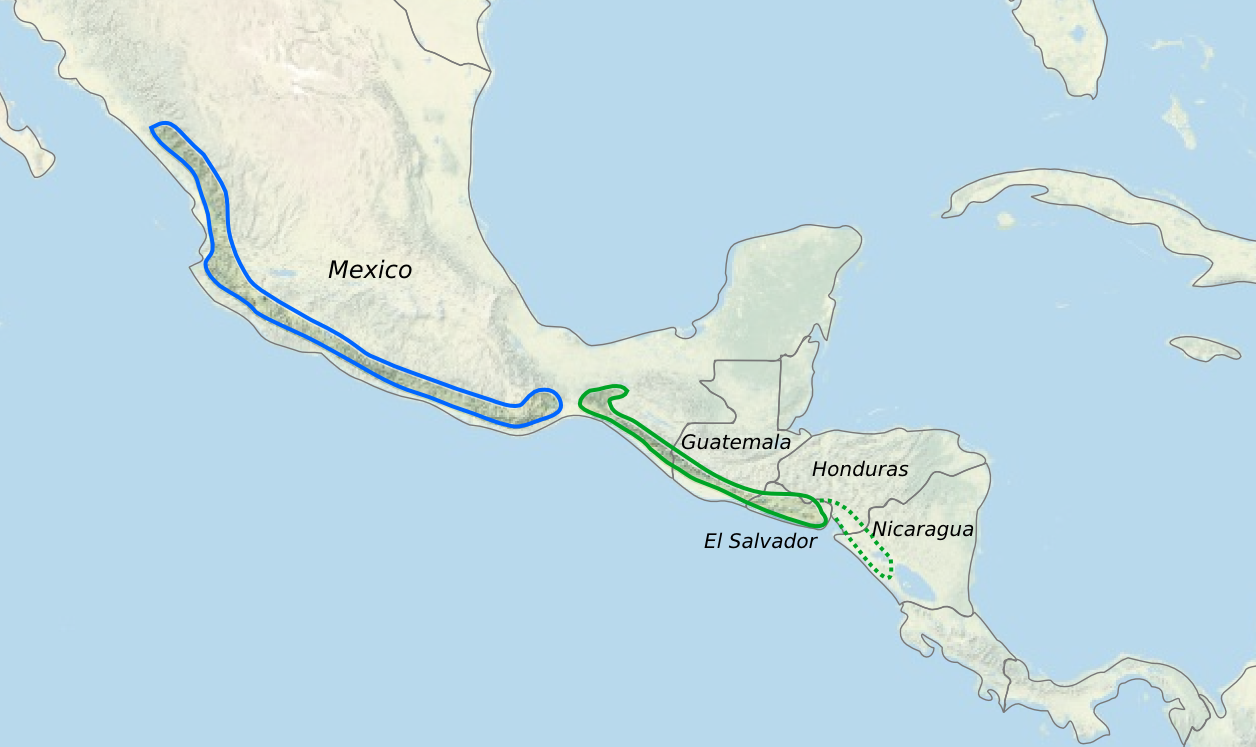
- Range: Meiracyllium gemma Meiracyllium trinasutum

= Meiracyllium =

Genus of orchids

Meiracyllium, abbreviated as Mrclm in horticultural trade, is a genus of orchids and the sole genus of the subtribe Meiracyllinae. The genus was erected by Heinrich Gustav Reichenbach. It is native to Mexico and Central America.

== Species ==
At present (June 2014), two species are recognized:

Image	Name	Distribution	Elevation (m)
	Meiracyllium gemma Rchb.f.	Sinaloa, Jalisco, Colima, Durango, Michoacán, Guerrero, Nayarit, Oaxaca	700–1,500 metres (2,300–4,900 ft)
	Meiracyllium trinasutum Rchb.f.	Oaxaca, Chiapas, Guatemala, El Salvador, Honduras	1,300 metres (4,300 ft)
