= Andreettaea cabellensis =

Scientific classification
- Kingdom: Plantae
- Clade: Tracheophytes
- Clade: Angiosperms
- Clade: Monocots
- Order: Asparagales
- Family: Orchidaceae
- Subfamily: Epidendroideae
- Tribe: Epidendreae
- Subtribe: Pleurothallidinae
- Genus: Andreettaea
- Species: A. cabellensis

Binomial name
- Andreettaea cabellensis (Rchb.f.) A.Doucette

Synonyms
- Humboltia cabellensis (Rchb.f.) Kuntze; Muscarella cabellensis (Rchb.f.) Karremans; Pleurothallis cabellensis Rchb.f. (1850); Pleurothallis fritzii Carnevali & G.A.Romero; Specklinia cabellensis (Rchb.f.) Pridgeon & M.W.Chase; Sylphia cabellensis (Rchb.f.) Luer; Verapazia cabellensis (Rchb.f.) Chiron & Szlach.

Species of plant

Andreettaea cabellensis is a species of orchid. It is an epiphyte native to eastern Colombia and western Venezuela, where it grows in the northern Andes from 1500 to 1800 meters elevation.
