= Andreettaea segregatifolia =

Scientific classification
- Kingdom: Plantae
- Clade: Tracheophytes
- Clade: Angiosperms
- Clade: Monocots
- Order: Asparagales
- Family: Orchidaceae
- Subfamily: Epidendroideae
- Tribe: Epidendreae
- Subtribe: Pleurothallidinae
- Genus: Andreettaea
- Species: A. segregatifolia

Binomial name
- Andreettaea segregatifolia (Ames & C.Schweinf.) A.Doucette

Synonyms
- Muscarella segregatifolia (Ames & C.Schweinf.) Karremans; Pleurothallis calyptrosepala L.O.Williams; Pleurothallis segregatifolia Ames & C.Schweinf. (1925) (basionym); Specklinia segregatifolia (Ames & C.Schweinf.) Solano & Soto Arenas; Verapazia segregatifolia (Ames & C.Schweinf.) Chiron & Szlach.

Species of plant

Andreettaea segregatifolia is a species of flowering plant in the orchid family. It is a tropical epiphyte which ranges from southern Mexico through Central America to Panama.
