= A. rosea =

A. rosea may refer to:

- Acrasis rosea, a heterolobosean species
- Aerides rosea, an orchid species
- Alcea rosea, the hollyhock, an ornamental plant species
- Antennaria rosea, the rosy pussytoes, a flowering plant species
- Atriplex rosea, the tumbling saltbush, red orach or tumbling orach, a saltbush species

== Synonyms ==
- Achatinella rosea, a synonym for Achatinella bulimoides
- Aranea rosea, a synonym for Micrommata virescens
- Arethusa rosea, a synonym for Bletia purpurata
- Athelia rosea, a synonym for Laeticorticium roseum

== See also ==
- Rosea (disambiguation)
