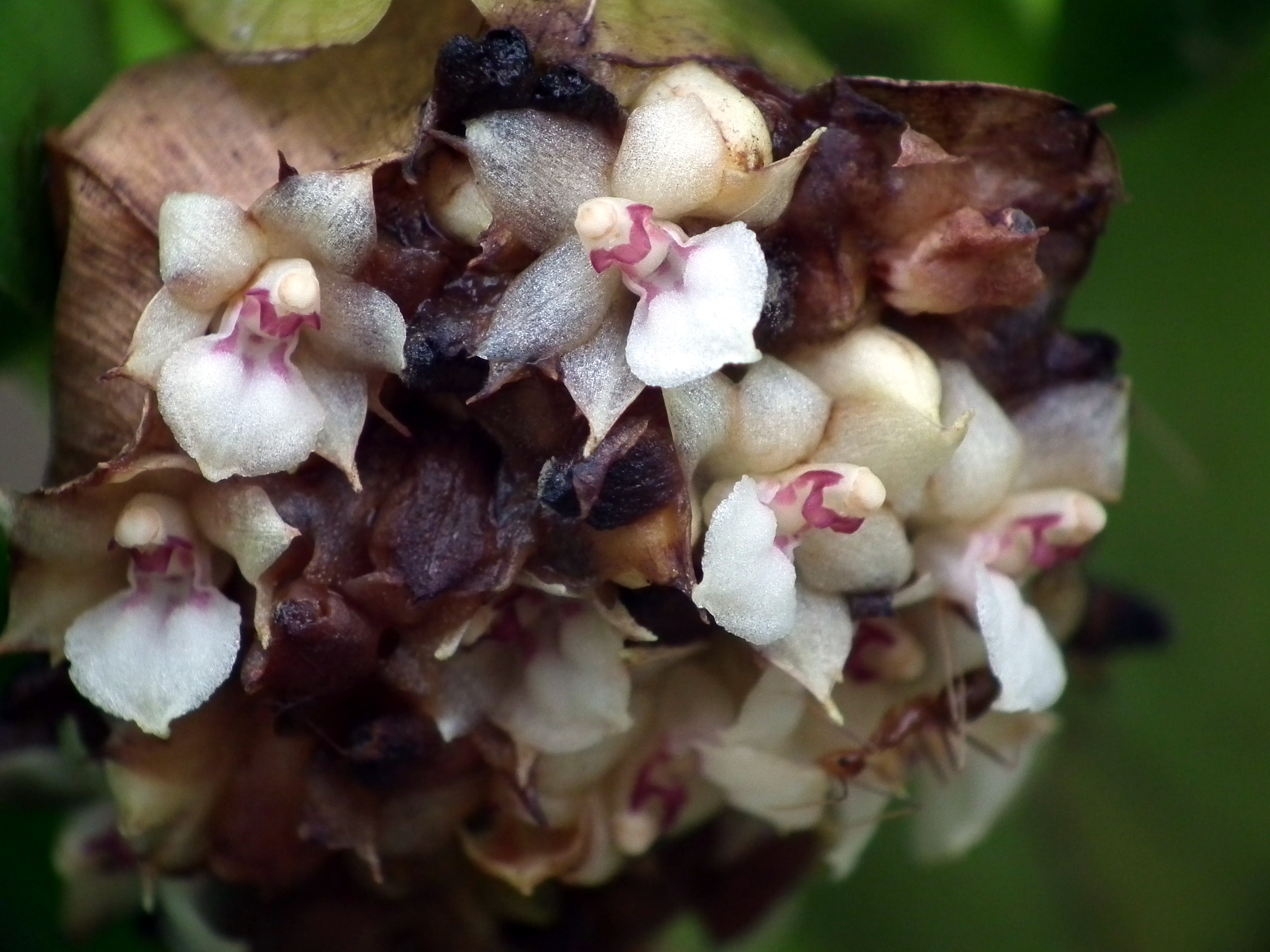
- Agrostophyllum philippinense photo by Ronny Boos

Scientific classification
- Kingdom: Plantae
- Clade: Tracheophytes
- Clade: Angiosperms
- Clade: Monocots
- Order: Asparagales
- Family: Orchidaceae
- Subfamily: Epidendroideae
- Tribe: Epidendreae
- Subtribe: Agrostophyllinae
- Genus: Agrostophyllum; Blume, 1825

Type species
- Agrostophyllum javanicum Blume

Synonyms
- Diploconchium Schauer; Chitonochilus Schltr. in K.M.Schumann & C.A.G.Lauterbach; Appendiculopsis (Schltr.) Szlach.

= Agrostophyllum =

Genus of orchids

Agrostophyllum is a genus with about ninety species from the orchid family (Orchidaceae). The genus name is derived from the Greek words agrostis ("grass") and phyllos ("leaf"), referring to the grass-like appearance of the leaves of some species.

These epiphytic orchids occur in tropical lowland forests, growing on trunks or branches of trees. They are found from the Seychelles, Madagascar, India, Sri Lanka, Malaysia, Indonesia to the Pacific Islands. The center of diversity is to be found in New Guinea, with at least 45 species.

These orchids have elongate, frequently pendulous stems with dense leaves that overlap at their base. They show peculiar, ball-like inflorescences of many bracts, bearing small flowers.

== Sections ==
There are four sections in this genus :

- Dolichodesme - elongated inflorescence which may have the form of a spike, but also may be partly branched as in a panicle.
- Agrostophyllum – Leaves somewhat longer; small flowers on a shortened apical head; a few species may only develop one or two flowers.
- Oliganthe - characterised by a much elongated rhizome and pendant sympodia. Leaves and flowers similar to those of the previous section.
- Appendiculopsis - slightly elongated, short creeping rhizomes; distichous, crowded, oblong leaves, at right angles with axis of stem, abruptly truncated at base, with a small petiole; terminal or lateral inflorescence; used to belong to the genus Appendicula.

== Species ==
Currently accepted species as of May 2014:

- Agrostophyllum acutum (New Guinea)
- Agrostophyllum amboinense (Ambon)
- Agrostophyllum appendiculoides (New Guinea)
- Agrostophyllum aristatum (Fiji)
- Agrostophyllum arundinaceum (Borneo)
- Agrostophyllum atrovirens (Ambon)
- Agrostophyllum bilobolabellatum (Papua New Guinea)
- Agrostophyllum bimaculatum : Double-spotted Agrostophyllum (New Guinea)
- Agrostophyllum brachiatum (New Guinea)
  - Agrostophyllum brachiatum var. brachiatum (New Guinea)
  - Agrostophyllum brachiatum var. latibrachiatum (New Guinea)
- Agrostophyllum brevipes (E. Himalaya to Indo-China)
- Agrostophyllum callosum (Nepal to Hainan)
- Agrostophyllum compressum (New Guinea)
- Agrostophyllum crassicaule (New Guinea, Bismarck Archipelago)
  - Agrostophyllum crassicaule var. bismarckiense (Bismarck Archipelago)
  - Agrostophyllum crassicaule var. crassicaule (New Guinea)
- Agrostophyllum curvilabre (New Guinea to Solomon Is.)
- Agrostophyllum cyathiforme (W. Malaysia)
- Agrostophyllum cycloglossum (New Guinea
- Agrostophyllum cyclopense (New Guinea)
- Agrostophyllum denbergeri (Sumatra to Java)
- Agrostophyllum dischorense (New Guinea)
- Agrostophyllum djararatense (Sumatra)
- Agrostophyllum dolychophyllum (New Guinea)
- Agrostophyllum earinoides (New Guinea)
- Agrostophyllum elatum (New Guinea)
- Agrostophyllum elmeri (Philippines)
- Agrostophyllum elongatum : Elongated Agrostophyllum (Malaysia to W. Pacific)
- Agrostophyllum fibrosum (New Guinea)
- Agrostophyllum finisterrae (New Guinea)
- Agrostophyllum flavidum (Assam)
- Agrostophyllum fragrans (New Guinea)
- Agrostophyllum globiceps (W. Sumatra)
- Agrostophyllum globigerum (N. Borneo)
- Agrostophyllum glumaceum (W. Malaysia)
- Agrostophyllum graminifolium (New Guinea to Vanuatu)
- Agrostophyllum grandiflorum (New Guinea)
- Agrostophyllum indifferens (Kalimantan)
- Agrostophyllum inocephalum (S. Taiwan to Philippines)
- Agrostophyllum javanicum (W. Malesia)
- Agrostophyllum kaniense (New Guinea)
- Agrostophyllum kusaiense (Caroline Is.)
- Agrostophyllum lamellatum (New Guinea)
- Agrostophyllum lampongense (Sumatra)
- Agrostophyllum laterale (Borneo)
- Agrostophyllum latilobum (W. & C. Java)
- Agrostophyllum laxum (W. Malaysia)
- Agrostophyllum leucocephalum (New Guinea to SW. Pacific)
- Agrostophyllum leytense (Philippines)
- Agrostophyllum longifolium (Pen. Thailand to Malaysia)
- Agrostophyllum longivaginatum (Philippines)
- Agrostophyllum luzonense (Philippines)
- Agrostophyllum macrocephalum (New Guinea)
- Agrostophyllum majus (Pen. Thailand to Vanuatu)
- Agrostophyllum malindangense (Philippines)
- Agrostophyllum mearnsii (N. Borneo to Philippines)
- Agrostophyllum megalurum (New Guinea to W. Pacific)
- Agrostophyllum merrillii (Philippines)
- Agrostophyllum mindanense (Philippines)
- Agrostophyllum montanum : Mountain Agrostophyllum (New Guinea)
- Agrostophyllum mucronatum (New Guinea)
- Agrostophyllum myrianthum (Sikkim, Arunachal Pradesh)
- Agrostophyllum neoguinense Kittr. (Papua New Guinea)
- Agrostophyllum niveum (New Guinea)
- Agrostophyllum occidentale (Seychelles, N. Madagascar)
- Agrostophyllum palawense (Caroline Is. - Palau)
- Agrostophyllum paniculatum ( New Guinea to Solomon Islands)
- Agrostophyllum papuanum (Papua New Guinea)
- Agrostophyllum parviflorum (Maluku to New Guinea)
- Agrostophyllum patentissimum (New Guinea)
- Agrostophyllum pelorioides (New Guinea)
- Agrostophyllum philippinense (Philippines)
- Agrostophyllum planicaule (Himalaya to Indo-China)
- Agrostophyllum potamophila : River-loving Agrostophyllum (New Guinea)
- Agrostophyllum rigidifolium (New Guinea)
- Agrostophyllum saccatilabium (Philippines)
- Agrostophyllum saccatum (Borneo)
- Agrostophyllum sepikanum (New Guinea)
- Agrostophyllum seychellarum (Seychelles)
- Agrostophyllum simile (Sulawesi)
- Agrostophyllum spicatum (New Guinea)
- Agrostophyllum stenophyllum (New Guinea)
- Agrostophyllum stipulatum (Indo-China, Malaysia to Solomon Islands)
  - Agrostophyllum stipulatum subsp. bicuspidatum (W. Malaysia)
  - Agrostophyllum stipulatum subsp. stipulatum (Indo-China, Malaysia to Solomon Islands)
- Agrostophyllum sumatranum (W. Sumatra, Borneo)
- Agrostophyllum superpositum (New Guinea to Solomon Islands)
- Agrostophyllum tenue (W. Malaysia)
- Agrostophyllum torricellense (New Guinea to S. Vanuatu)
- Agrostophyllum trifidum (Sumatra, Borneo)
- Agrostophyllum uniflorum (New Guinea)
- Agrostophyllum vanhulstijnii (Maluku)
- Agrostophyllum ventricosum (New Guinea)
- Agrostophyllum verruciferum (New Guinea)
- Agrostophyllum wenzelii (Philippines)
- Agrostophyllum zeylanicum (Sri Lanka)
