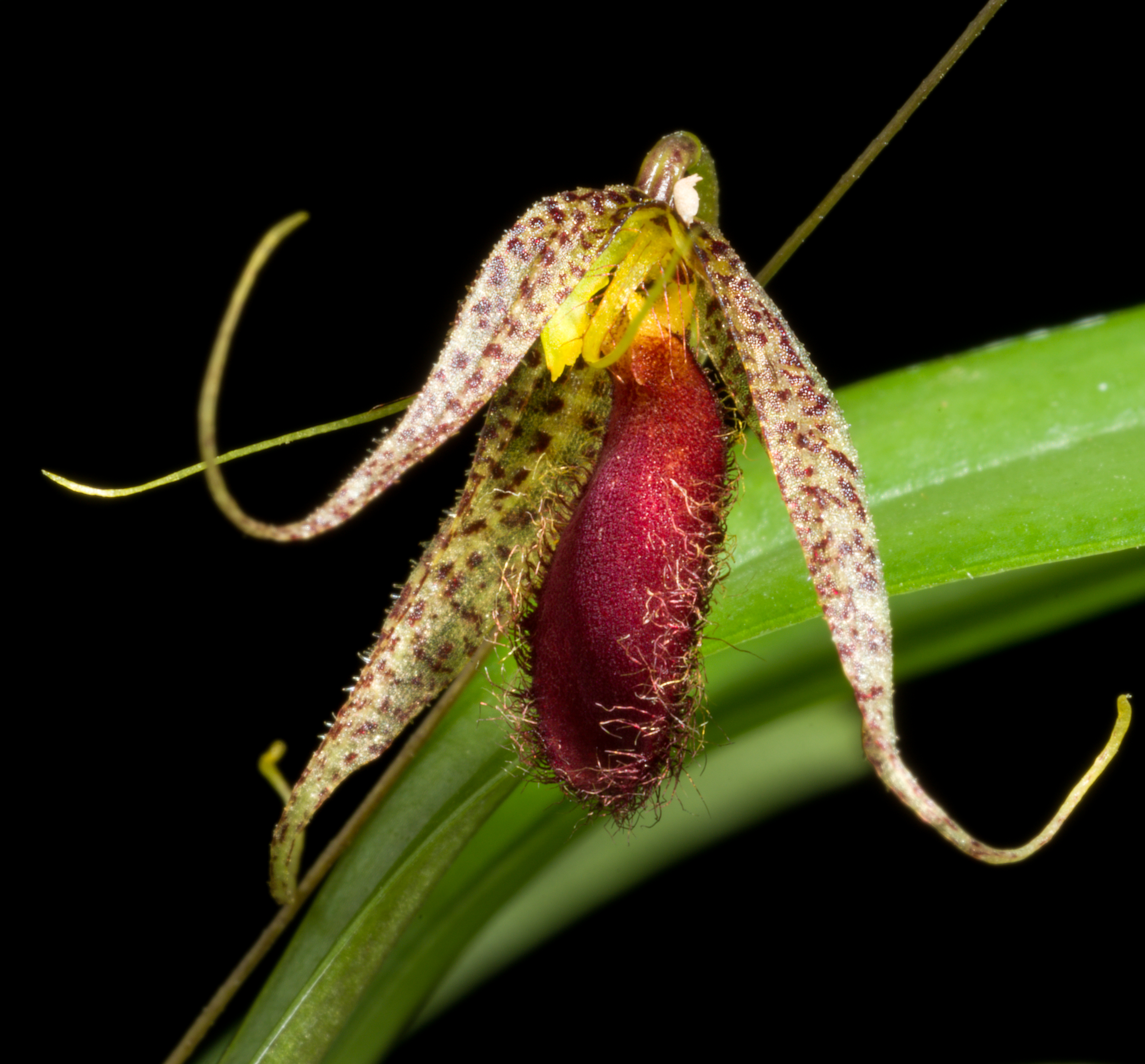
- Andreettaea megalops

Scientific classification
- Kingdom: Plantae
- Clade: Tracheophytes
- Clade: Angiosperms
- Clade: Monocots
- Order: Asparagales
- Family: Orchidaceae
- Subfamily: Epidendroideae
- Tribe: Epidendreae
- Subtribe: Pleurothallidinae
- Genus: Andreettaea; Luer

Species
- See text.

Synonyms
- Muscarella Luer; Vaginaella Vierling; Verapazia Archila, nom. superfl.

= Andreettaea =

Genus of orchids

Andreettaea is a genus of flowering plant in the family Orchidaceae, native to southern Mexico, Central America, the West Indies, and tropical South America. The genus was established in 1978. Some sources treat the genus as a synonym of Pleurothallis.

== Species ==
As of August 2025, Plants of the World Online accepted the following species:

- Andreettaea ancora (Luer & R.Vásquez) A.Doucette
- Andreettaea aristata (Hook.) A.Doucette
- Andreettaea barberiana (Rchb.f.) Karremans
- Andreettaea bota-caucanensis (Uribe Vélez & Sauleda) Karremans
- Andreettaea cabellensis (Rchb.f.) A.Doucette
- Andreettaea catoxys (Luer & Hirtz) A.Doucette
- Andreettaea cestrochila (Garay) A.Doucette
- Andreettaea claviculata (Luer & Hirtz) A.Doucette
- Andreettaea clavigera (Luer) A.Doucette
- Andreettaea coeloglossa (Luer & Hirtz) A.Doucette
- Andreettaea corynetes (Luer & R.Vásquez) A.Doucette
- Andreettaea cryptophyta (Barb.Rodr.) A.Doucette
- Andreettaea cynocephala (Luer) A.Doucette
- Andreettaea delicatula (Lindl.) A.Doucette
- Andreettaea divexa (Ames) A.Doucette
- Andreettaea echinodes (Luer & R.Escobar) A.Doucette
- Andreettaea exesilabia (A.H.Heller & A.D.Hawkes) A.Doucette
- Andreettaea fimbriata (Ames & C.Schweinf.) Pupulin
- Andreettaea fuchsii (Luer) A.Doucette
- Andreettaea furcatipetala (Luer & Hirtz) A.Doucette
- Andreettaea gongylodes (Luer) A.Doucette
- Andreettaea hastata (Ames) A.Doucette
- Andreettaea helenae (Fawc. & Rendle) A.Doucette
- Andreettaea herpestes (Luer) A.Doucette
- Andreettaea ichthyonekys (Luer) A.Doucette
- Andreettaea infinita (Luer) A.Doucette
- Andreettaea intonsa (Luer & R.Escobar) A.Doucette
- Andreettaea kennedyi (Luer) A.Doucette
- Andreettaea latilabris (Foldats) A.Doucette
- Andreettaea lipothrix (Luer) A.Doucette
- Andreettaea llamachoi (Luer) A.Doucette
- Andreettaea longilabris (Lindl.) A.Doucette
- Andreettaea macroblepharis (Rchb.f.) A.Doucette
- Andreettaea marginata (Rich.) A.Doucette
- Andreettaea megalops (Luer) A.Doucette
- Andreettaea mucronata (Lindl. ex Cogn.) A.Doucette
- Andreettaea obliquipetala (Acuña & C.Schweinf.) A.Doucette
- Andreettaea oblonga (Luer & Hirtz) A.Doucette
- Andreettaea ocellus Luer
- Andreettaea perangusta (Luer) A.Doucette
- Andreettaea quinqueseta (Ames) A.Doucette
- Andreettaea rojohnii (Luer) A.Doucette
- Andreettaea samacensis (Ames) A.Doucette
- Andreettaea schudelii (Luer & Hirtz) A.Doucette
- Andreettaea segregatifolia (Ames & C.Schweinf.) A.Doucette
- Andreettaea semperflorens (Lindl.) A.Doucette
- Andreettaea sibatensis (F.Lehm. & Kraenzl.) A.Doucette
- Andreettaea strumosa (Ames) A.Doucette
- Andreettaea stumpflei (Luer) A.Doucette
- Andreettaea tamboensis (Luer & R.Escobar) A.Doucette
- Andreettaea tapantiensis (Mel.Fernández & Bogarín) A.Doucette
- Andreettaea tempestalis (Luer) A.Doucette
- Andreettaea trullifera (Luer & Hirtz) A.Doucette
- Andreettaea tsubotae (Luer & R.Escobar) A.Doucette
- Andreettaea villosilabia (Luer & Hirtz) A.Doucette
- Andreettaea werneri (Luer) A.Doucette
- Andreettaea xanthella (Luer) A.Doucette
- Andreettaea xyloura (Luer & Hirtz) A.Doucette
- Andreettaea zephyrina (Rchb.f.) A.Doucette
