= Andreettaea tsubotae =

Scientific classification
- Kingdom: Plantae
- Clade: Tracheophytes
- Clade: Angiosperms
- Clade: Monocots
- Order: Asparagales
- Family: Orchidaceae
- Subfamily: Epidendroideae
- Tribe: Epidendreae
- Subtribe: Pleurothallidinae
- Genus: Andreettaea
- Species: A. tsubotae

Binomial name
- Andreettaea tsubotae (Luer & R.Escobar) A.Doucette

Synonyms
- Muscarella tsubotae (Luer & R.Escobar) Luer; Pleurothallis tsubotae Luer & R.Escobar (1996) (basionym); Specklinia tsubotae (Luer & R.Escobar) Luer

Species of orchid

Andreettaea tsubotae is a species of flowering plant in the orchid family. It is an epiphyte known from Risaralda Department of Colombia, where it grows in humid Andean forest at 1400 meters elevation.
