= Andreettaea cestrochila =

Scientific classification
- Kingdom: Plantae
- Clade: Tracheophytes
- Clade: Angiosperms
- Clade: Monocots
- Order: Asparagales
- Family: Orchidaceae
- Subfamily: Epidendroideae
- Tribe: Epidendreae
- Subtribe: Pleurothallidinae
- Genus: Andreettaea
- Species: A. cestrochila

Binomial name
- Andreettaea cestrochila (Garay) A.Doucette

Synonyms
- Muscarella cestrochila (Garay) Luer; Pleurothallis cestrochila Garay (1973) (basionym); Specklinia cestrochila (Garay) Pridgeon & M.W.Chase

Species of plant

Andreettaea cestrochila is a species of flowering plant in the orchid family. It is an epiphyte native to Colombia and Ecuador.
