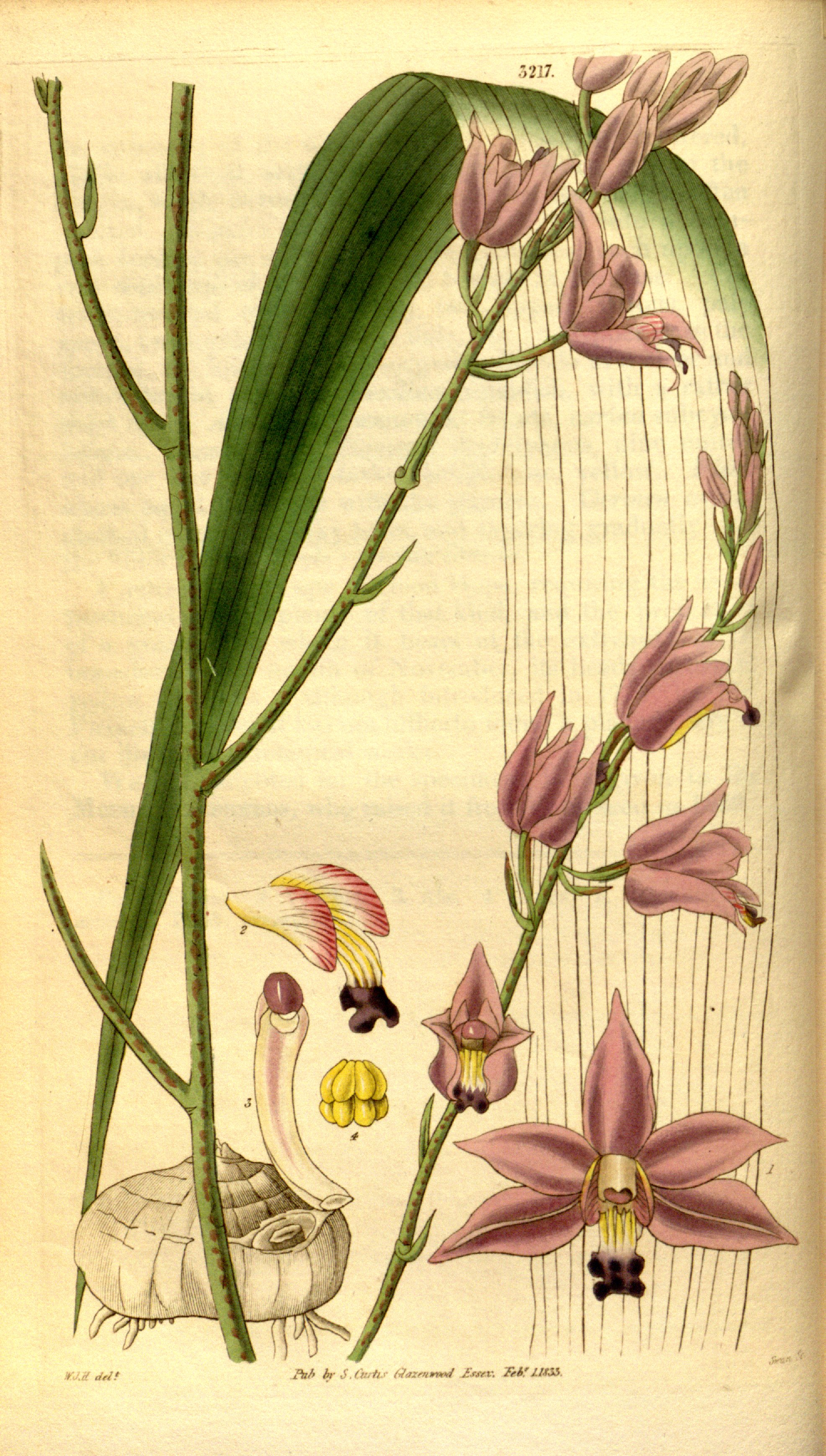
- 1833 illustration Curtis's Botanical Magazine

Scientific classification
- Kingdom: Plantae
- Clade: Tracheophytes
- Clade: Angiosperms
- Clade: Monocots
- Order: Asparagales
- Family: Orchidaceae
- Subfamily: Epidendroideae
- Genus: Bletia
- Species: B. purpurea

Binomial name
- Bletia purpurea (Lam.) DC.

Synonyms
- Bletia acutipetala Hook.; Bletia alta (L.) Hitchc.; Bletia expansa Ten.; Bletia florida R. Br.; Bletia havanensis Lindl.; Bletia pallida Lodd.; Bletia pottsii S. Watson; Bletia pulchella auct.; Bletia purpurea var. alba Ariza-Julia & J.Jiménez Alm.; Bletia purpurea var. pittieri Schltr.; Bletia tuberosa (L.) Ames; Bletia verecunda (Salisb.) R. Br.; Cymbidium altum Willd.; Cymbidium floridum Salisb.; Cymbidium trifidum (Michx.) Sw.; Cymbidium verecundum (Salisb.) Sw.; Epidendrum altum (Willd.) Poir.; Gyas verecunda (Salisb.) Salisb.; Helleborine americana Steud.; Limodorum floridum Salisb.; Limodorum purpureum Lam.; Limodorum trifidum Michx.; Limodorum tuberosum Jacq.; Limodorum tuberosum L.; Limodorum verecundum Salisb.; Serapias purpurea (Lam.) Poir.; Thiebautia nervosa Colla

= Bletia purpurea =

Species of orchid

Bletia purpurea, common name pine-pink or sharp-petaled bletia, is a species of orchid widespread across much of Latin America and the West Indies, and also found in Florida. They are terrestrial in swamps or sometimes found growing on logs or stumps above the high tide mark.

Bletia purpurea can reach a length of 180 cm (5 feet). It has ovoid (egg-shaped) pseudobulbs up to 4 cm (1.6 inches) in diameter. Leaves are linear or narrowly elliptic, up to 100 cm (40 inches) long. Flowers are pink, purple, or occasionally white, in racemes or panicles sometimes with as many as 80 flowers. Sepals are smaller than those of B. patula, usually less than 30 mm (1.2 in) long.
