= Basiphyllaea =

Scientific classification
- Kingdom: Plantae
- Clade: Tracheophytes
- Clade: Angiosperms
- Clade: Monocots
- Order: Asparagales
- Family: Orchidaceae
- Subfamily: Epidendroideae
- Tribe: Epidendreae
- Subtribe: Bletiinae
- Genus: Basiphyllaea; Schltr.

Type species
- Basiphyllaea sarcophylla (Rchb.f.) Schltr.

Synonyms
- Carteria Small, Torreya 10: 187 (1910), illegitimate, not Diesing 1866.

Genus of orchids

Basiphyllaea is a genus of orchids (family Orchidaceae), known as Carter's orchid or crab orchids. They are native to Florida and the West Indies. At the present time (May 2014), 7 species are recognized:

- Basiphyllaea carabiaiana (L.O.Williams) Sosa & M.A.Díaz - Cuba
- Basiphyllaea corallicola (Small) Ames - Florida, Bahamas, Cuba, Hispaniola, Puerto Rico
- Basiphyllaea hamiltoniana Ackerman & Whitten - Jamaica
- Basiphyllaea hoffmannii M.A.Díaz & Llamacho - Cuba
- Basiphyllaea sarcophylla (Rchb.f.) Schltr. - Cuba
- Basiphyllaea volubilis (M.A.Díaz) Sosa & M.A.Díaz - Cuba
- Basiphyllaea wrightii (Acuña) Nir - Cuba
