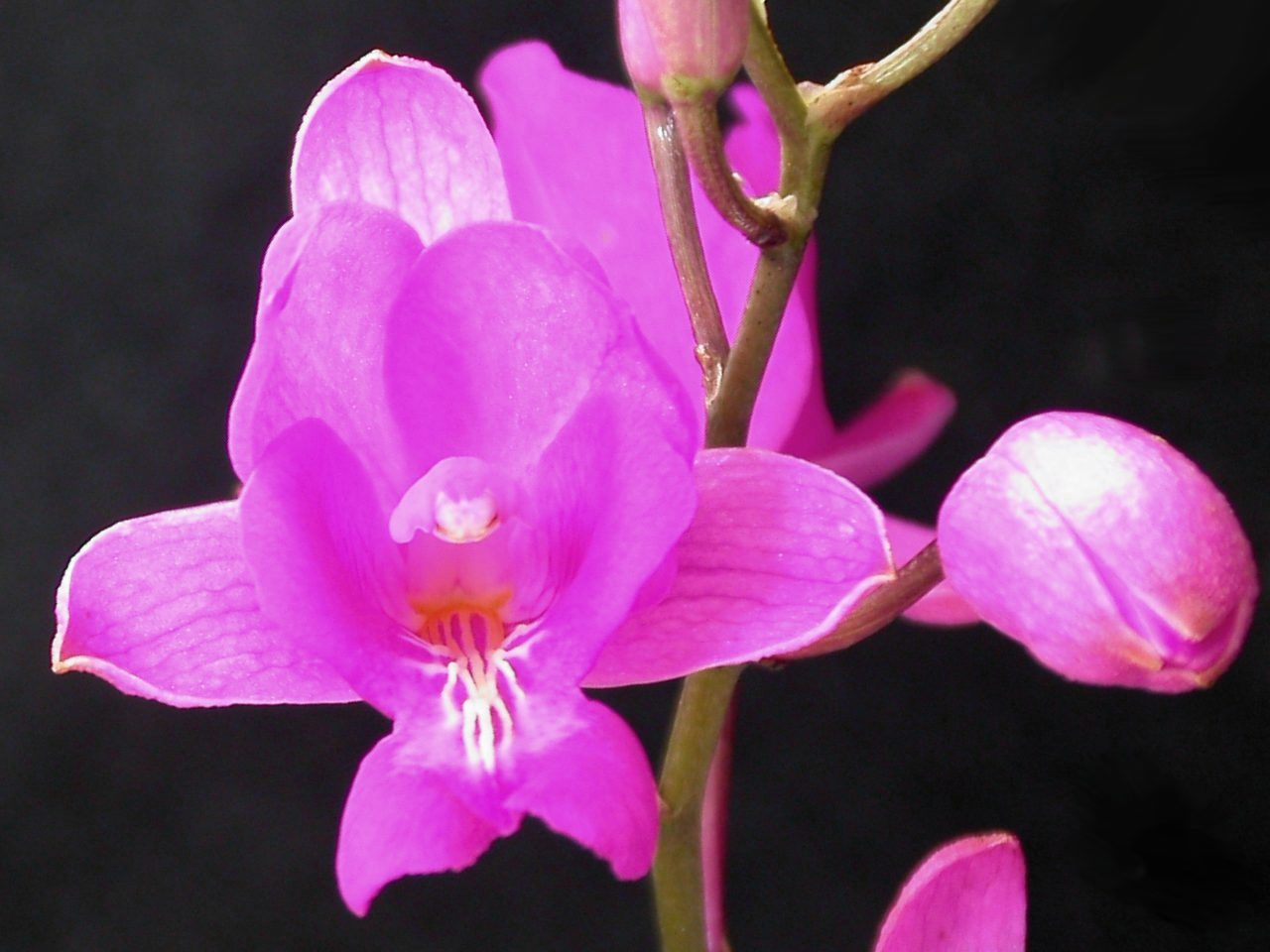
- Bletia catenulata flower

Scientific classification
- Kingdom: Plantae
- Clade: Tracheophytes
- Clade: Angiosperms
- Clade: Monocots
- Order: Asparagales
- Family: Orchidaceae
- Subfamily: Epidendroideae
- Tribe: Epidendreae
- Subtribe: Bletiinae; Benth.

Genera
- Basiphyllaea; Bletia; Chysis; Hexalectris

= Bletiinae =

Subtribe of orchids

Bletiinae is a small-sized subtribe of orchids in the tribe Epidendreae of the subfamily Epidendroideae.

The tribe was initially categorized by John Lindley in 1840. Bletiinae has been recognized as a subtribe to Arethuseae. However, most of its genera were removed in 2005, and the subtribe moved to Epidendreae.
