= Andreettaea quinqueseta =

Scientific classification
- Kingdom: Plantae
- Clade: Tracheophytes
- Clade: Angiosperms
- Clade: Monocots
- Order: Asparagales
- Family: Orchidaceae
- Subfamily: Epidendroideae
- Tribe: Epidendreae
- Subtribe: Pleurothallidinae
- Genus: Andreettaea
- Species: A. quinqueseta

Binomial name
- Andreettaea quinqueseta (Ames) A.Doucette

Synonyms
- Muscarella quinqueseta (Ames) Luer; Pleurothallis quinqueseta Ames (1925) (basionym); Specklinia quinqueseta (Ames) Luer

Species of orchid

Andreettaea quinqueseta is a species of flowering plant in the orchid family. It is an epiphyte native to Costa Rica and Panama.
