= Andreettaea zephyrina =

Scientific classification
- Kingdom: Plantae
- Clade: Tracheophytes
- Clade: Angiosperms
- Clade: Monocots
- Order: Asparagales
- Family: Orchidaceae
- Subfamily: Epidendroideae
- Tribe: Epidendreae
- Subtribe: Pleurothallidinae
- Genus: Andreettaea
- Species: A. zephyrina

Binomial name
- Andreettaea zephyrina (Rchb.f.) A.Doucette

Synonyms
- Synonymy: Humboltia arachnantha (Rchb.f.) Kuntze; Humboltia setigera (Lindl.) Kuntze; Humboltia zephyrina (Rchb.f.) Kuntze; Muscarella zephyrina (Rchb.f.) Luer; Pleurothallis arachnantha Rchb.f.; Pleurothallis bulbophylloides Schltr.; Pleurothallis fimbripetala Schltr.; Pleurothallis lauta Schltr.; Pleurothallis schistopetala Schltr.; Pleurothallis setigera Lindl.; Pleurothallis zephyrina Rchb.f. (1855) (basionym); Specklinia bulbophylloides (Schltr.) Luer; Specklinia setigera (Lindl.) Pridgeon & M.W.Chase; Specklinia zephyrina (Rchb.f.) Luer; Trichosalpinx zephyrina (Rchb.f.) Luer

Species of orchid

Andreettaea zephyrina is a species of flowering plant in the orchid family. It is an epiphyte native to humid tropical montane forests in Bolivia, Colombia, Ecuador, Peru, and northwestern Venezuela. In Colombia it is native to the Andes and Sierra Nevada de Santa Marta from 1500 to 2800 meters elevation in the departments of Antioquia, Bogotá, Cauca, Cundinamarca, Magdalena, and Santander.
