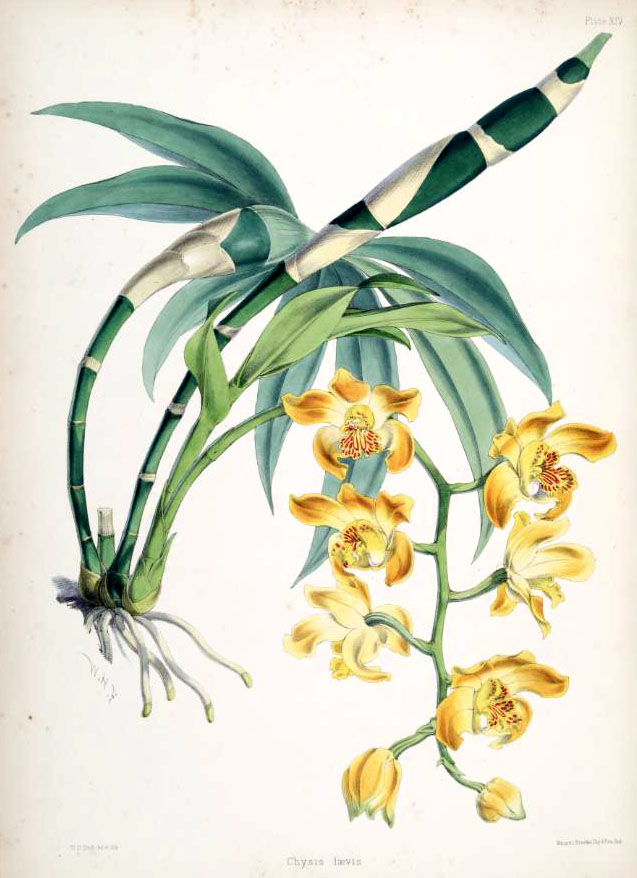
- Chysis laevis, illustration

Scientific classification
- Kingdom: Plantae
- Clade: Tracheophytes
- Clade: Angiosperms
- Clade: Monocots
- Order: Asparagales
- Family: Orchidaceae
- Subfamily: Epidendroideae
- Tribe: Epidendreae
- Subtribe: Bletiinae
- Genus: Chysis; Lindl.

Type species
- Chysis aurea

Synonyms
- Thorvaldsenia Liebm.

= Chysis =

Genus of orchids

Chysis is a genus of orchids (family Orchidaceae), consisting of 10 currently accepted species (as of May 2014) which originate in the region from Mexico to Peru. Only two or three of these are commonly found in cultivation. The genus is abbreviated Chy in trade journals.

== Description ==
The genus is typified by elongate, spindle-shaped, usually pendulous pseudobulbs of several internodes, which may be fat or slender, depending on the species. The leaves tend to be quite soft and papery, strongly ribbed and long. The leaves can take a good deal more light than is apparent from their thickness. This genus also tends to be partially deciduous, though leaves are often retained for two years.

The inflorescences are multi-flowered and arise from the base of the pseudobulb with the new growth. Flower colour tends to range from white (as in Chysis bractescens) to orange-yellow (as in Chysis aurea and Chysis laevis), and the pollinia often tend to be fused (hence the genus name Chysis which is Greek for "melting").

Chysis are epiphytic and grow under shady and damp conditions up to 1000 meters elevation. The plants should be grown under intermediate conditions, generally mounted due to their pendulous habit, though some species adapt well to pot culture. The plants should be watered and fed heavily while they are in active growth, with less water given once the season's growth is completed. They should never be allowed to completely dry out, however, even during the rest period, and the pseudobulbs should never be allowed to shrivel.

== List of species ==
Species accepted as of May 2014:

| Image | Name | Distribution | Elevation (m) |
|---|---|---|---|
| | Chysis addita Dressler 2000 | Chiapas, Guatemala | 1,250 metres (4,100 ft) |
| | Chysis archilae Chiron 2010 | Guatemala | 400 metres (1,300 ft) |
| | Chysis aurea Lindl. 1837 | Panama, Colombia, Venezuela | 700–1,700 metres (2,300–5,600 ft) |
| | Chysis bractescens Lindl. 1840 | Oaxaca, Tabasco, Guatemala, Belize, El Salvador, Honduras, Nicaragua | 800–1,500 metres (2,600–4,900 ft) |
| | Chysis bruennowiana Rchb.f. & Warsz. 1857 | Costa Rica, Nicaragua, Colombia, Ecuador, Peru | 600–1,200 metres (2,000–3,900 ft) |
| | Chysis chironii Archila 2010 | Guatemala | 1,500–1,700 metres (4,900–5,600 ft) |
| | Chysis laevis Lindl. 1840 | Chiapas, Oaxaca, Guatemala, El Salvador, Honduras, Nicaragua | 1,800 metres (5,900 ft) |
| | Chysis limminghei Linden & Rchb.f. 1858 | Guatemala, Tabasco | 0 metres (0 ft) |
| | Chysis tricostata Schltr. 1922 | Costa Rica, Nicaragua, Honduras | 1,360 metres (4,460 ft) |
| | Chysis violacea Dressler 2003 | Panama | 500–1,000 metres (1,600–3,300 ft) |
