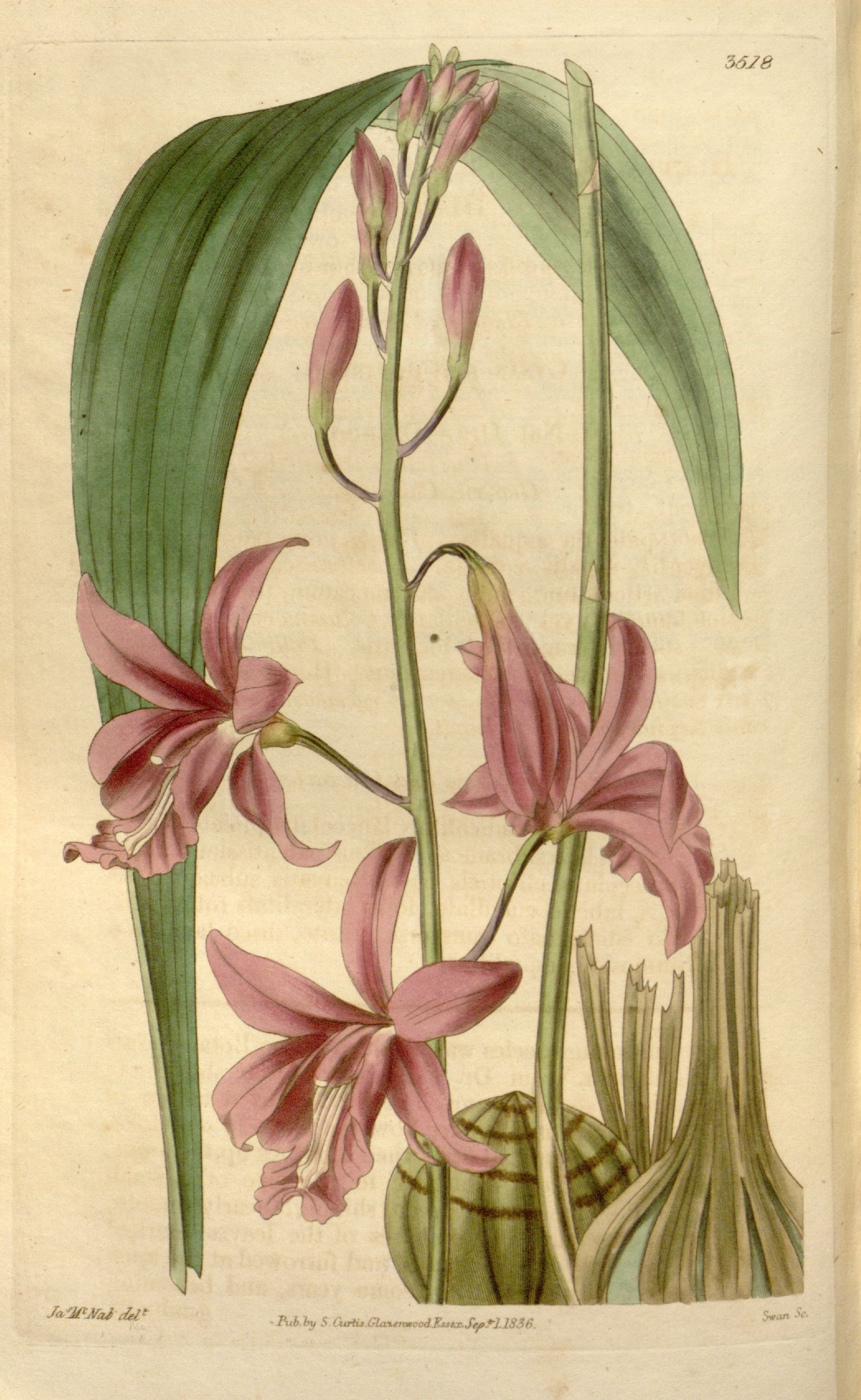
- 1836 illustration Curtis's botanical magazine

Scientific classification
- Kingdom: Plantae
- Clade: Tracheophytes
- Clade: Angiosperms
- Clade: Monocots
- Order: Asparagales
- Family: Orchidaceae
- Subfamily: Epidendroideae
- Tribe: Epidendreae
- Subtribe: Bletiinae
- Genus: Bletia; Ruiz & Pav.

Type species
- Bletia catenulata Ruiz & Pav.

Synonyms
- Gyas Salisb.; Bletiana Raf.; Thiebautia Colla; Crybe Lindl.; Anthogyas Raf.; Regnellia Barb.Rodr.

= Bletia =

Genus of orchids

Bletia is a genus of about 56 species of orchids (family Orchidaceae), almost all of which are terrestrial; some are occasionally lithophytic or epiphytic. It is named after Spanish botanist and pharmacist Don Luis Blet. The genus is widespread across Florida, Mexico, Central America, the West Indies, and South America as far south as Argentina.

== List of species ==
Accepted species include:

- Bletia adenocarpa Rchb.f.
- Bletia altilamellata Garay
- Bletia amabilis C.Schweinf.
- Bletia antillana M.A.Diaz & Sosa
- Bletia arizonica (S.Watson) Sosa & M.W.Chase
- Bletia brevicaulis (L.O.Williams) Sosa & M.W.Chase
- Bletia campanulata Lex.
- Bletia candida Kraenzl.
- Bletia carabiaiana L.O.Williams
- Bletia catenulata Ruiz & Pav.
- Bletia coccinea Lex.
- Bletia colemanii (Catling) Sosa & M.W.Chase
- Bletia concolor Dressler
- Bletia corallicola (Small) Sosa & M.W.Chase
- Bletia × ekmanii Serguera & Sánchez Los.
- Bletia ensifolia L.O.Williams
- Bletia fallax (M.I.Rodr. & R.González) Sosa & M.W.Chase
- Bletia florida (Salisb.) R.Br.
- Bletia gracilis Lodd.
- Bletia greenmaniana L.O.Williams
- Bletia greenwoodiana Sosa
- Bletia hamiltoniana (Ackerman & Whitten) Sosa & M.W.Chase
- Bletia hoffmannii (M.A.Díaz & Llamacho) Sosa & M.W.Chase
- Bletia lilacina A.Rich. & Galeotti
- Bletia macristhmochila Greenm.
- Bletia meridana (Rchb.f.)Garay & Dunst.
- Bletia mexicana (Greenm.)Sosa & M.W.Chase
- Bletia mixtecana Salazar & C.Chávez
- Bletia neglecta Sosa
- Bletia nelsonii Ames
- Bletia netzeri Senghas
- Bletia nitida (L.O.Williams) Sosa & M.W.Chase
- Bletia parkinsonii Hook.
- Bletia parva Sosa & M.W.Chase
- Bletia patula Hook.
- Bletia punctata Lex.
- Bletia purpurata A.Rich. & Galeotti
- Bletia purpurea (Lam.) DC.
- Bletia reflexa Lindl.
- Bletia revoluta (Correll) Sosa & M.W.Chase
- Bletia riparia Sosa & Palestina
- Bletia roezlii Rchb.f.
- Bletia santosii H.Ávila, J.G.González & Art.Castro
- Bletia sarcophylla Rchb.f.
- Bletia × similis Dressler
- Bletia spicata (Walter)Sosa & M.W.Chase
- Bletia stenophylla Schltr.
- Bletia × tamayoana S.Rosillo ex Soltero
- Bletia tenuifolia Ames & C.Schweinf.
- Bletia urbana Dressler
- Bletia villae Soto Arenas
- Bletia volubilis M.A.Díaz
- Bletia wageneri Rchb.f.
- Bletia warfordiana Sosa
- Bletia warnockii (Ames & Correll) Sosa & M.W.Chase
- Bletia wrightii Acuña
