= Andreettaea samacensis =

Scientific classification
- Kingdom: Plantae
- Clade: Tracheophytes
- Clade: Angiosperms
- Clade: Monocots
- Order: Asparagales
- Family: Orchidaceae
- Subfamily: Epidendroideae
- Tribe: Epidendreae
- Subtribe: Pleurothallidinae
- Genus: Andreettaea
- Species: A. samacensis

Binomial name
- Andreettaea samacensis (Ames) A.Doucette

Synonyms
- Muscarella samacensis (Ames) Luer; Pleurothallis samacensis Ames (1923) (basionym); Specklinia samacensis (Ames) Pridgeon & M.W.Chase

Species of orchid

Andreettaea samacensis is a species of flowering plant in the orchid family. It is an epiphyte native to the tropical Americas, ranging from eastern Ecuador to Colombia, Venezuela, and northern Brazil (Roraima), as well as Costa Rica and Guatemala. In Colombia it is found in humid montane forests in the Andes of Antioquia Department at 2500 meters elevation.
