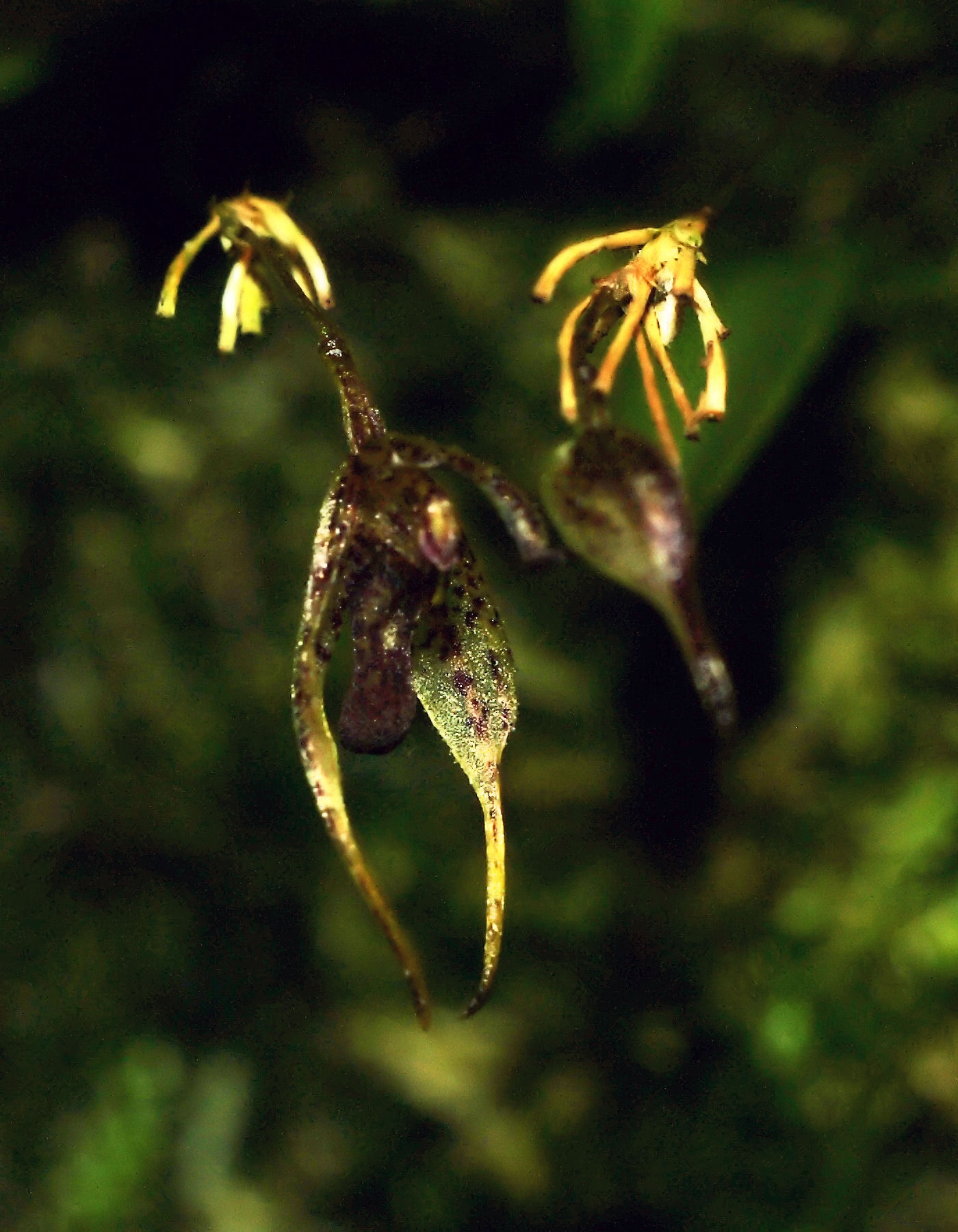

Scientific classification
- Kingdom: Plantae
- Clade: Tracheophytes
- Clade: Angiosperms
- Clade: Monocots
- Order: Asparagales
- Family: Orchidaceae
- Subfamily: Epidendroideae
- Tribe: Epidendreae
- Subtribe: Pleurothallidinae
- Genus: Andreettaea
- Species: A. aristata

Binomial name
- Andreettaea aristata (Hook.) A.Doucette

Synonyms
- Humboltia aristata (Hook.) Kuntze; Muscarella aristata (Hook.) Luer; Pleurothallis aristata Hook. (1839 publ. 1838) (basionym); Pleurothallis urbaniana Rchb.f.; Specklinia aristata (Hook.) Pridgeon & M.W.Chase)

= Andreettaea aristata =

Species of orchid

Andreettaea aristata is a species of orchid. It is an epiphyte native the tropical Americas, ranging from the Caribbean and Costa Rica to Bolivia, northern Brazil, and southeastern Brazil.
