= Andreettaea furcatipetala =

Scientific classification
- Kingdom: Plantae
- Clade: Tracheophytes
- Clade: Angiosperms
- Clade: Monocots
- Order: Asparagales
- Family: Orchidaceae
- Subfamily: Epidendroideae
- Tribe: Epidendreae
- Subtribe: Pleurothallidinae
- Genus: Andreettaea
- Species: A. furcatipetala

Binomial name
- Andreettaea furcatipetala (Luer & Hirtz) A.Doucette

Synonyms
- Muscarella furcatipetala (Luer & Hirtz) Luer; Pleurothallis furcatipetala Luer & Hirtz (2001) (basionym); Specklinia furcatipetala (Luer & Hirtz) Luer

Species of orchid

Andreettaea furcatipetala is a species of flowering plant in the orchid family. It is an epiphyte native to eastern Ecuador.
