= Andreettaea claviculata =

Scientific classification
- Kingdom: Plantae
- Clade: Tracheophytes
- Clade: Angiosperms
- Clade: Monocots
- Order: Asparagales
- Family: Orchidaceae
- Subfamily: Epidendroideae
- Tribe: Epidendreae
- Subtribe: Pleurothallidinae
- Genus: Andreettaea
- Species: A. claviculata

Binomial name
- Andreettaea claviculata (Luer & Hirtz) A.Doucette

Synonyms
- Muscarella claviculata (Luer & Hirtz) Luer; Pleurothallis claviculata Luer & Hirtz (1996) (basionym); Specklinia claviculata (Luer & Hirtz) Luer

Species of plant

Andreettaea claviculata is a species of flowering plant in the orchid family. It is an epiphyte endemic to Pastaza Province of eastern Ecuador.
