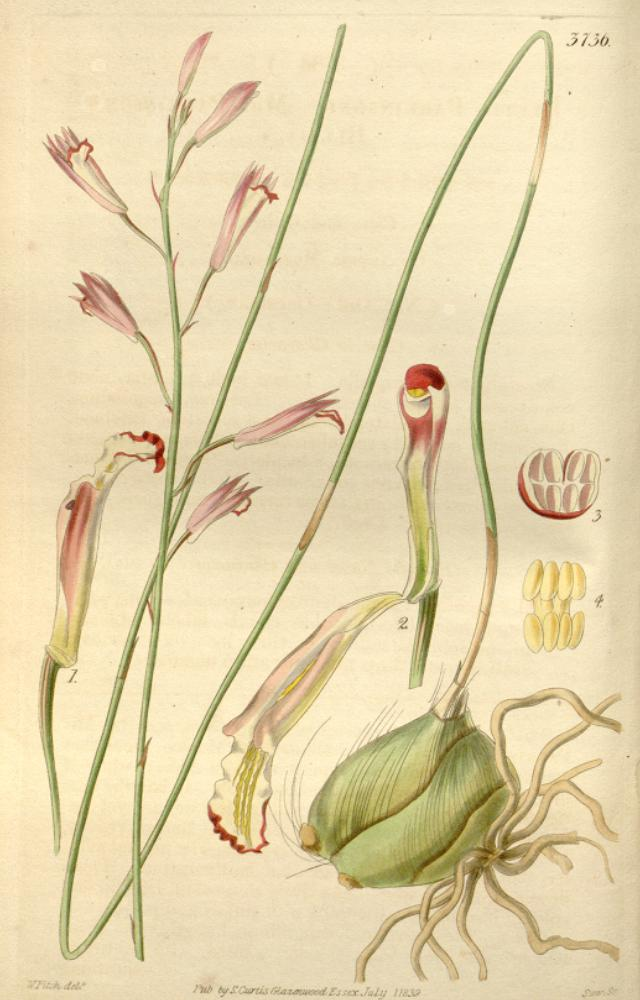
- 1840 illustration Curtis's botanical magazine

Scientific classification
- Kingdom: Plantae
- Clade: Tracheophytes
- Clade: Angiosperms
- Clade: Monocots
- Order: Asparagales
- Family: Orchidaceae
- Subfamily: Epidendroideae
- Genus: Bletia
- Species: B. parkinsonii

Binomial name
- Bletia parkinsonii Hook.

= Bletia parkinsonii =

Species of orchid

Bletia parkinsonii is a species of orchid found in Guatemala and much of Mexico (from Chiapas to Nuevo León).
