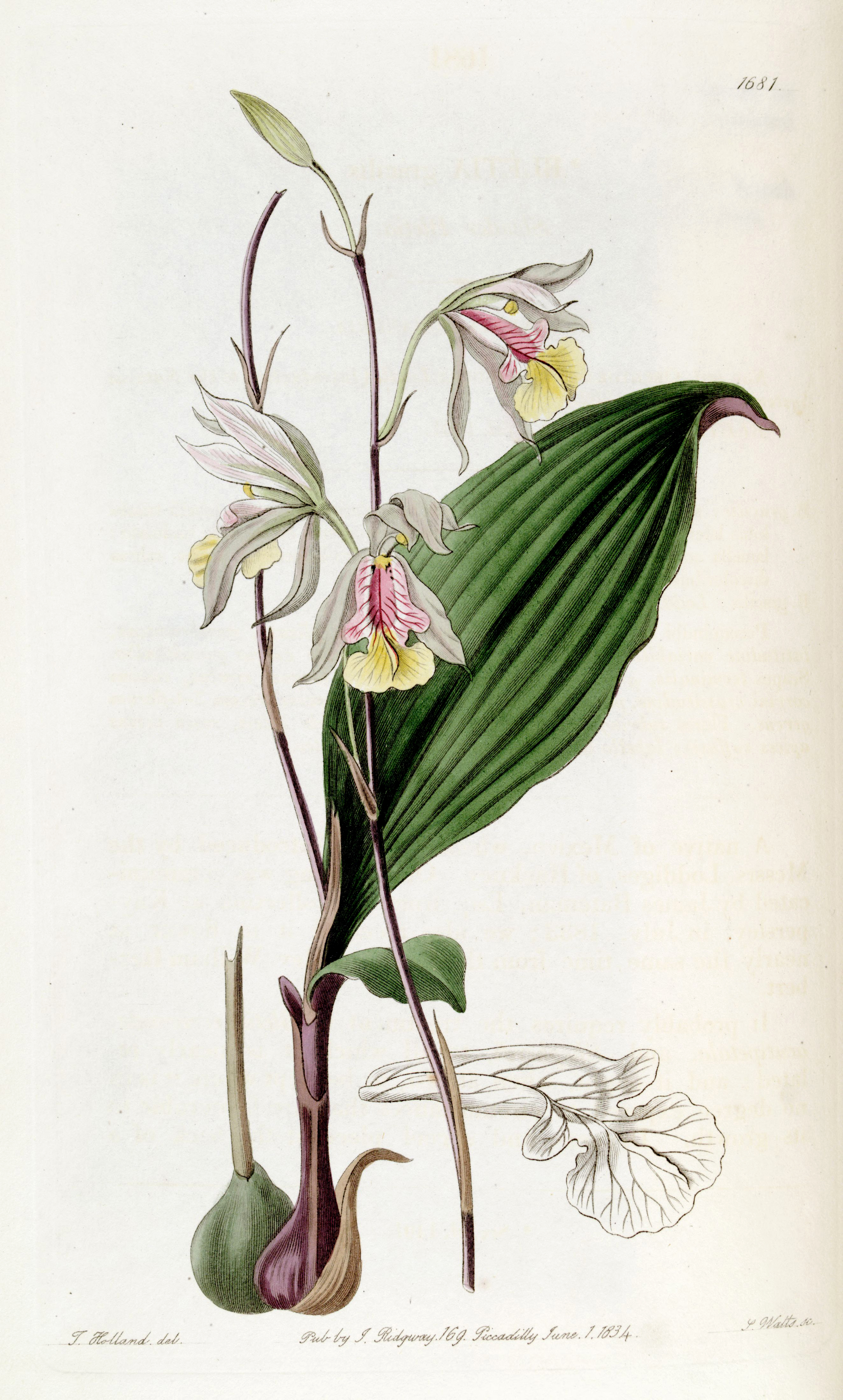
- 1835 illustration Edwards's Botanical Register

Scientific classification
- Kingdom: Plantae
- Clade: Tracheophytes
- Clade: Angiosperms
- Clade: Monocots
- Order: Asparagales
- Family: Orchidaceae
- Subfamily: Epidendroideae
- Genus: Bletia
- Species: B. gracilis

Binomial name
- Bletia gracilis Lodd.

= Bletia gracilis =

Species of orchid

Bletia gracilis is a species of orchid found in Guatemala, Honduras and Mexico.
