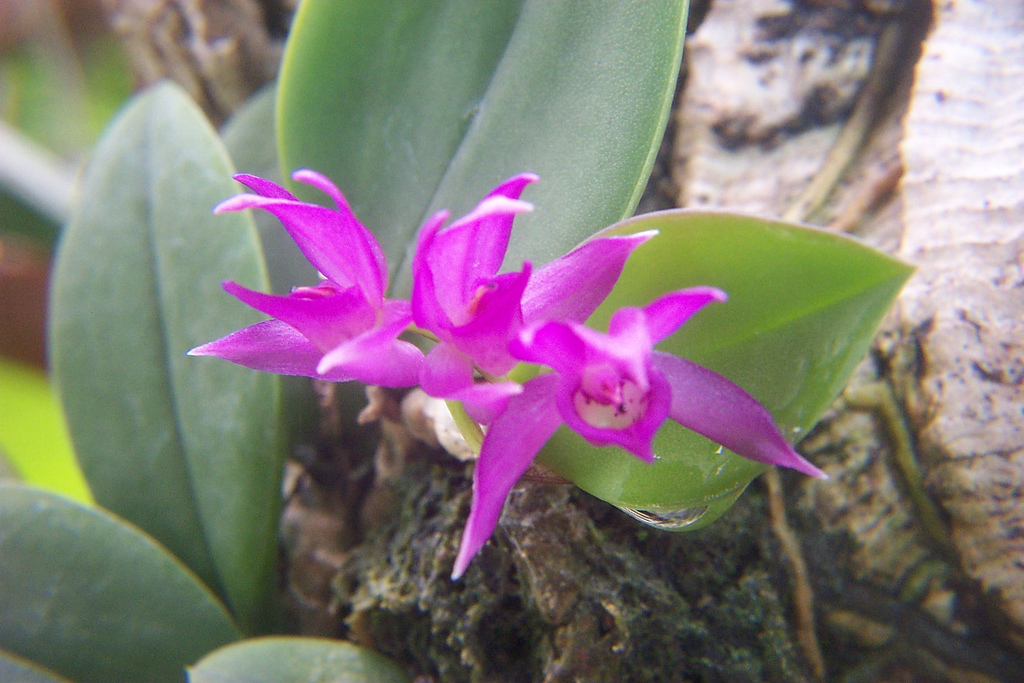

Scientific classification
- Kingdom: Plantae
- Clade: Tracheophytes
- Clade: Angiosperms
- Clade: Monocots
- Order: Asparagales
- Family: Orchidaceae
- Subfamily: Epidendroideae
- Genus: Meiracyllium
- Species: M. trinasutum

Binomial name
- Meiracyllium trinasutum Rchb.f. (1854)

Synonyms
- Meiracyllium wendlandii Rchb.f. (1866)

= Meiracyllium trinasutum =

Species of orchid

Meiracyllium trinasutum is a member of the family Orchidaceae. It is a miniature sized creeping epiphyte or lithophyte native to Mexico, Guatemala and El Salvador.
