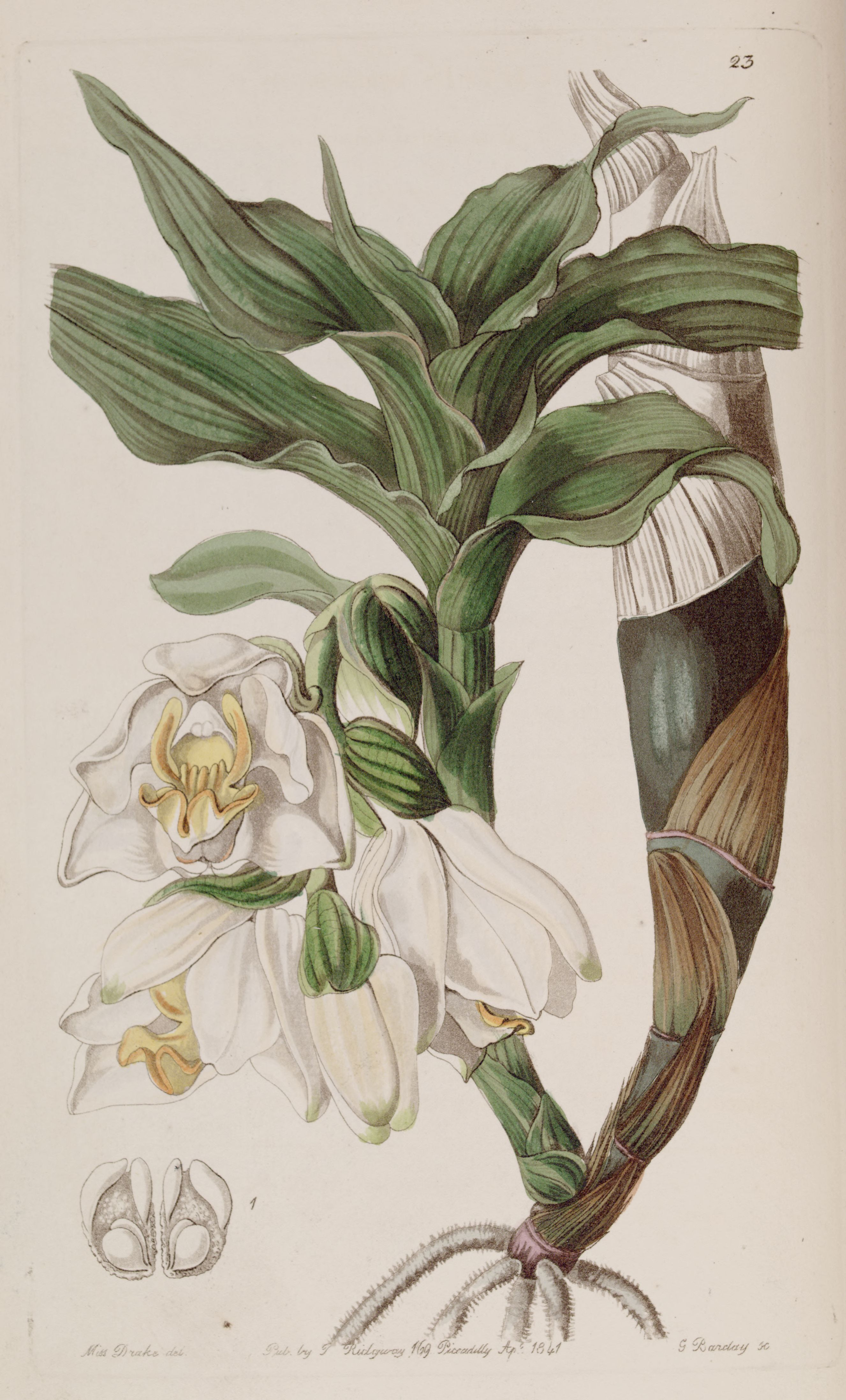
- 1841 illustration from Edwards's Botanical Register

Scientific classification
- Kingdom: Plantae
- Clade: Tracheophytes
- Clade: Angiosperms
- Clade: Monocots
- Order: Asparagales
- Family: Orchidaceae
- Subfamily: Epidendroideae
- Genus: Chysis
- Species: C. bractescens

Binomial name
- Chysis bractescens Lindl. (1840)

Synonyms
- Chysis aurea var. bractescens (Lindl.) P.H.Allen; Thorvaldsenia speciosa Liebm. (1844); Chysis makoyi Heynh. (1846)

= Chysis bractescens =

Species of orchid

Chysis bractescens is a species of orchid. It is native to Oaxaca, Tabasco, Guatemala, Belize, El Salvador, Honduras, and Nicaragua.
