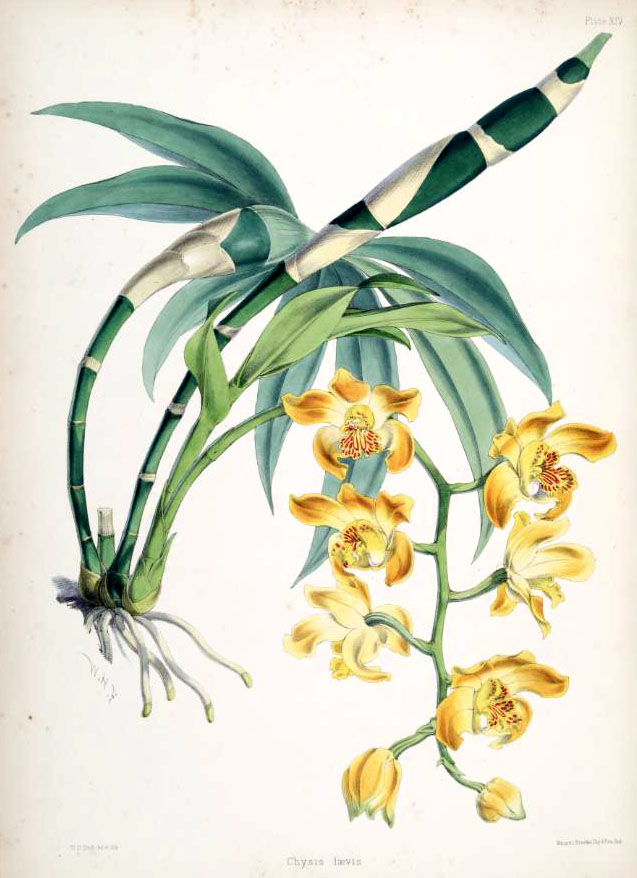
- Illustration c 1870 from "Select orchidaceous plants"

Scientific classification
- Kingdom: Plantae
- Clade: Tracheophytes
- Clade: Angiosperms
- Clade: Monocots
- Order: Asparagales
- Family: Orchidaceae
- Subfamily: Epidendroideae
- Genus: Chysis
- Species: C. laevis

Binomial name
- Chysis laevis Lindl. (1840)

Synonyms
- Chysis orichalcea Dressler (2000); Chysis nietana Gojon Sánchez (1930)

= Chysis laevis =

Species of orchid

Chysis laevis is a species of epiphytic orchid. Its distribution is across lower Mexico and Central America in places such as Chiapas, Oaxaca, Guatemala, El Salvador, Honduras, Nicaragua and Costa Rica.
