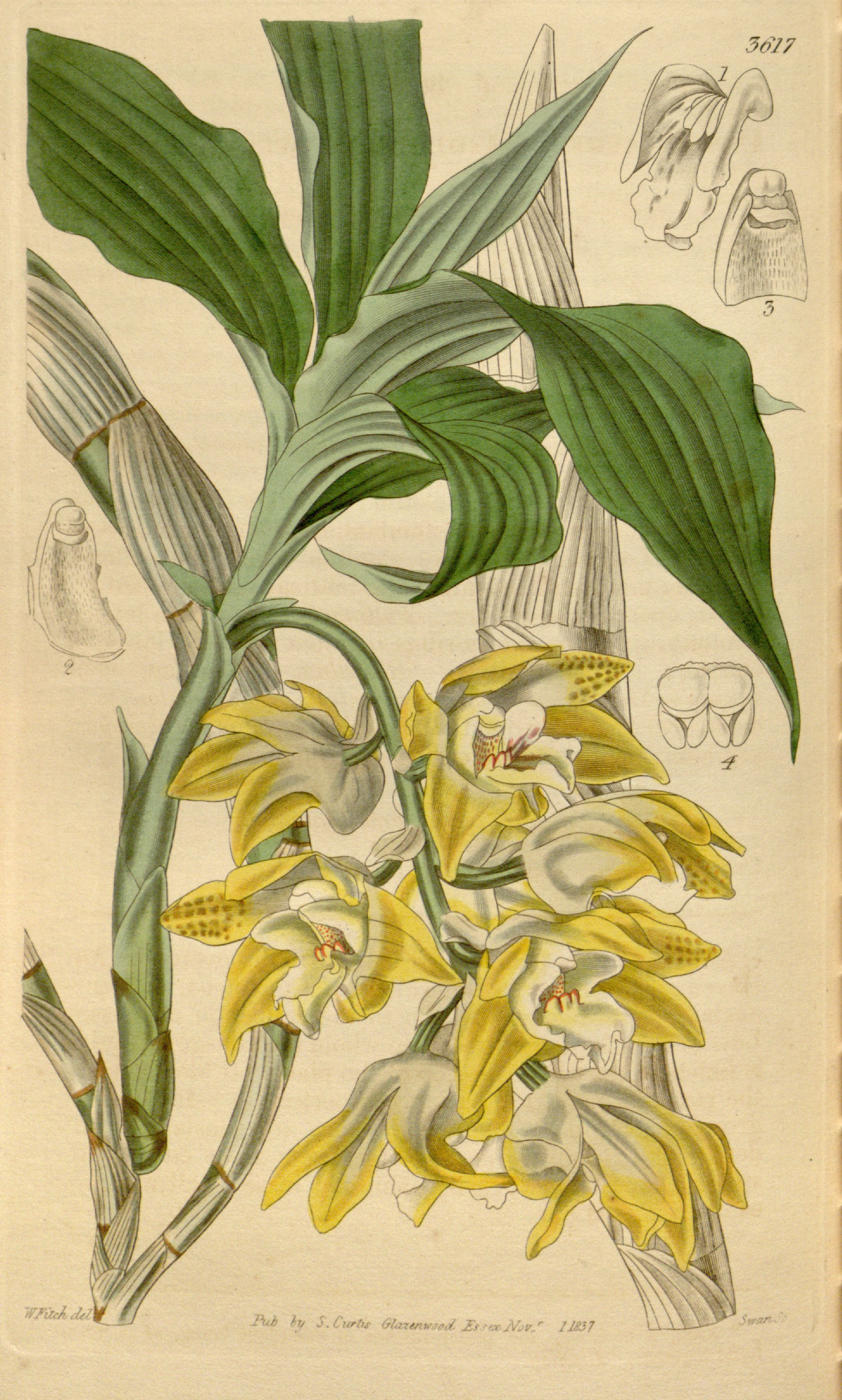
- 1837 illustration from Curtis's botanical magazine

Scientific classification
- Kingdom: Plantae
- Clade: Tracheophytes
- Clade: Angiosperms
- Clade: Monocots
- Order: Asparagales
- Family: Orchidaceae
- Subfamily: Epidendroideae
- Genus: Chysis
- Species: C. aurea

Binomial name
- Chysis aurea Lindl. (1837)

= Chysis aurea =

Golden-flowered chysis

Species of orchid

Chysis aurea, the golden-flowered chysis, is an epiphytic species of orchid. It is the type species of the genus Chysis. It is native to Panama, Colombia, and Venezuela.
