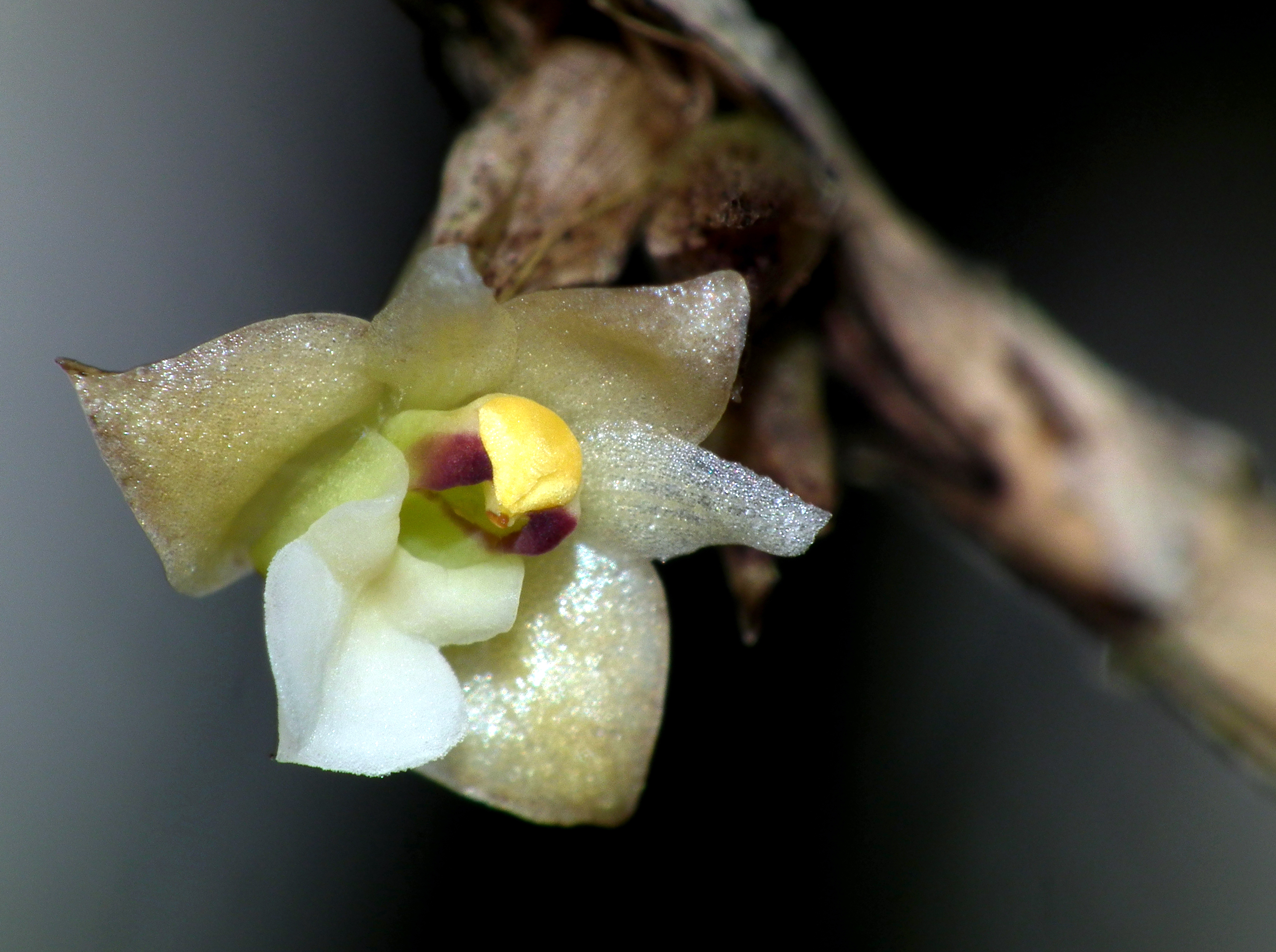

Scientific classification
- Kingdom: Plantae
- Clade: Tracheophytes
- Clade: Angiosperms
- Clade: Monocots
- Order: Asparagales
- Family: Orchidaceae
- Subfamily: Epidendroideae
- Genus: Agrostophyllum
- Species: A. elongatum

Binomial name
- Agrostophyllum elongatum (Ridl.) Schuit.

= Agrostophyllum elongatum =

Species of orchid

Agrostophyllum elongatum, the elongated Agrostophyllum, is a member of Orchidaceae, found in the Philippines, Borneo, Java, Malaysia, Maluku, Sumatra, New Guinea, the Solomons, Vanuatu and the Caroline Islands.
