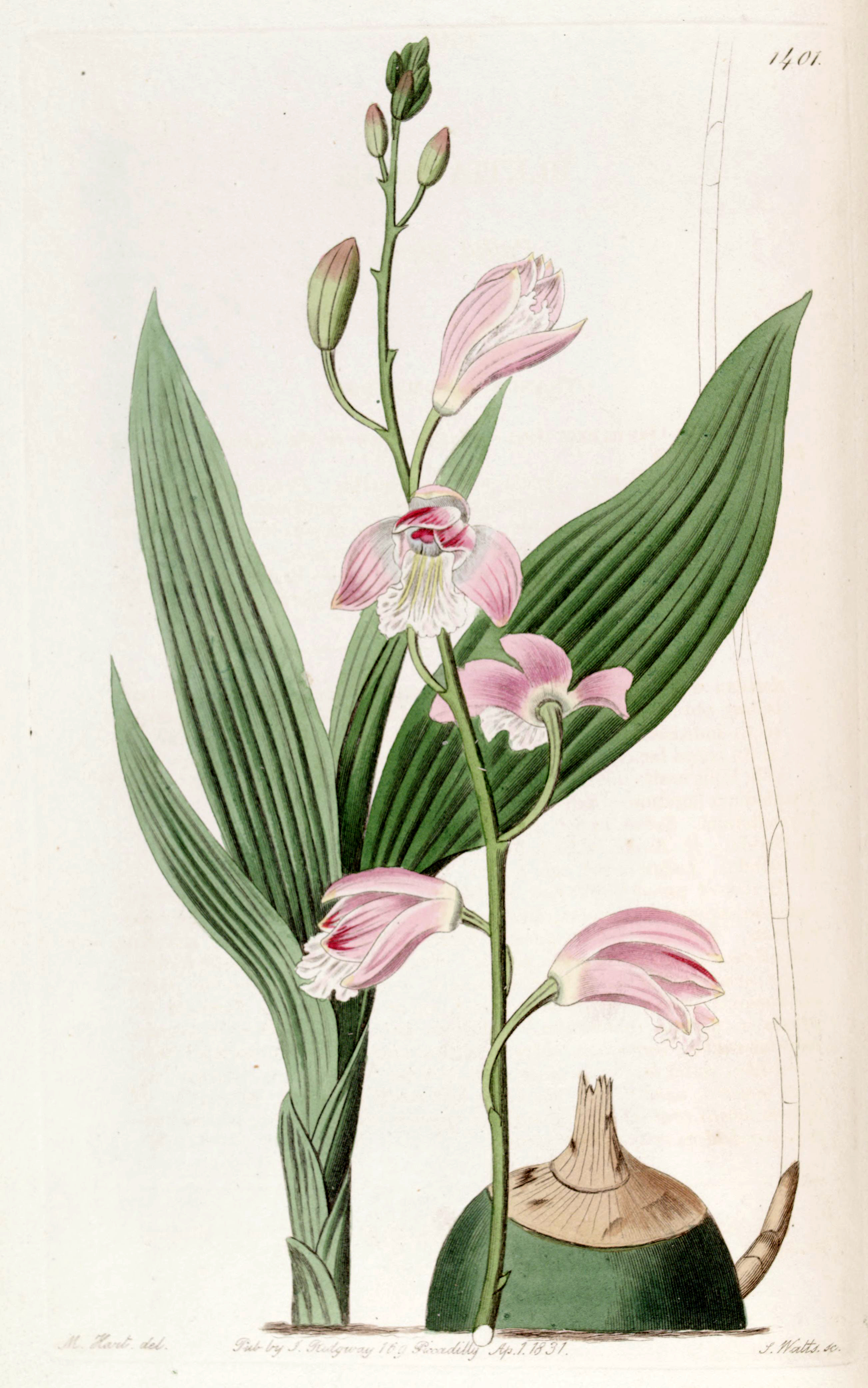
- 1831 illustration Edwards's Botanical Register

Scientific classification
- Kingdom: Plantae
- Clade: Tracheophytes
- Clade: Angiosperms
- Clade: Monocots
- Order: Asparagales
- Family: Orchidaceae
- Subfamily: Epidendroideae
- Genus: Bletia
- Species: B. florida

Binomial name
- Bletia florida (Salisb.) R.Br.

Synonyms
- Limodorum floridum Salisb.; Gyas florida (Salisb.) Salisb.; Bletia pallida Lodd.; Thiebautia nervosa Colla; Cymbidium floridum (Salisb.) Lindl.; Bletia shepherdii Hook.; Bletilla florida (Salisb.) Rchb.f.

= Bletia florida =

Species of orchid

Bletia florida is a species of orchid. It is native to Jamaica, Cuba and the Cayman Islands in the Caribbean. It is also reportedly naturalized in Trinidad and Tobago, as well as parts of Florida.
