= Basiphyllaea corallicola =

Conservation status
- Imperiled (NatureServe)

Scientific classification
- Kingdom: Plantae
- Clade: Tracheophytes
- Clade: Angiosperms
- Clade: Monocots
- Order: Asparagales
- Family: Orchidaceae
- Subfamily: Epidendroideae
- Genus: Basiphyllaea
- Species: B. corallicola

Binomial name
- Basiphyllaea corallicola (Small) Ames

Synonyms
- Carteria corallicola Small; Basiphyllaea angustifolia Schltr.

Species of orchid

Basiphyllaea corallicola is a species of orchid native to Florida, Bahamas, Cuba, Hispaniola, and Puerto Rico.

Basiphyllaea corallicola is a terrestrial herb up to 40 cm (16 in) tall, with underground tubers. Leaves are narrowly linear to elliptic, up to 25 cm (9.8 in) long. Flowers are borne in a scape of up to 10 nodding flowers, each yellow-green with a white lip.
