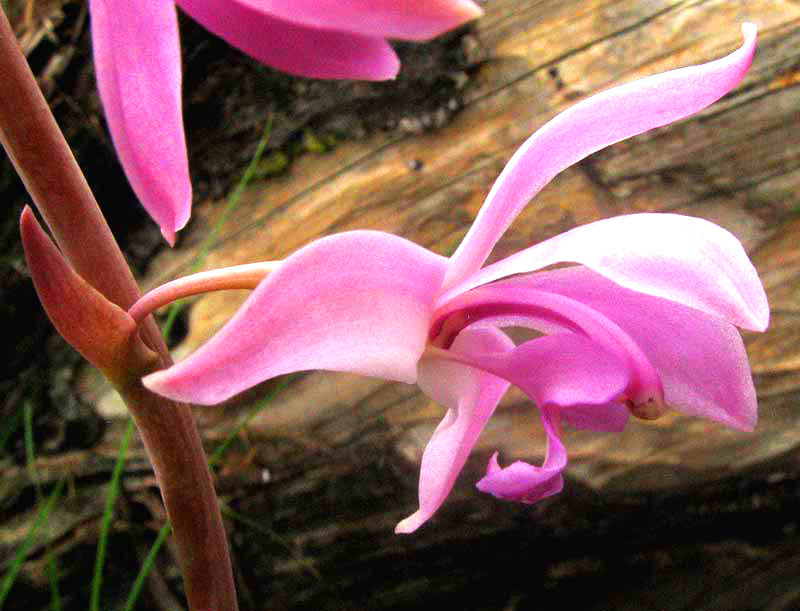
- Flower
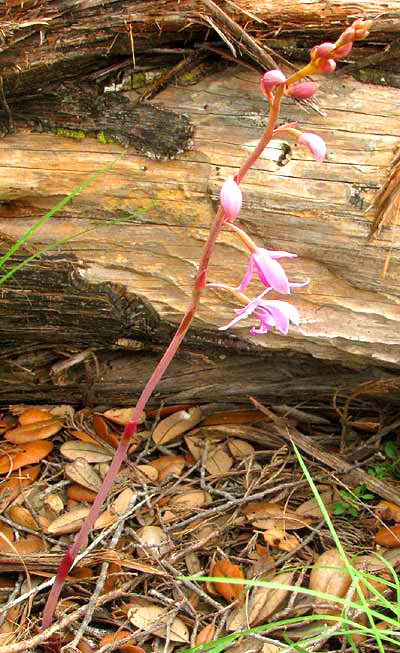
- Plant in habitat

Scientific classification
- Kingdom: Plantae
- Clade: Tracheophytes
- Clade: Angiosperms
- Clade: Monocots
- Order: Asparagales
- Family: Orchidaceae
- Subfamily: Epidendroideae
- Genus: Bletia
- Species: B. mexicana

Binomial name
- Bletia mexicana (Greenm.) Sosa & M.W.Chase

Synonyms
- Hexalectris mexicana Greenm. (1903); Corallorhiza grandiflora A.Rich. & Galeotti (1845); Hexalectris grandiflora (A.Rich. & Galeotti) L.O.Williams (1944); Hexalectris grandiflora f. luteoalba P.M.Br (2006); Neottia grandiflora (A.Rich. & Galeotti) Kuntze (1891)

= Bletia mexicana =

Genus of orchids

Bletia mexicana, the largeflower crested coralroot, is a species of flowering plant.

== Description ==
Bletia mexicana produces no leaves. The species is holomycotrophic, obtaining all its nutrition from organic substances provided by fungi. Hence the plant doesn't need chlorophyll-bearing leaves for photosynthesis.

The flower clusters, sometimes with more than a dozen per head, grow to 60cm tall (~2 feet). Blossoms are widely spaced and vividly pink. The margin of the 3-lobed labellum is edged in pink with a white patch and five ridges at the center.

== Range ==
Bletia mexicana occurs in Central & SW. Texas The main population appears to be in the Big Bend region of southwestern Texas. However, isolated observations have been made in Dallas County in northeastern Texas. The one illustrated in this page's taxonomy box were found between these two locations, in Uvalde County. This apparently disjunct distribution pattern raises the question of whether the species is expanding toward the north, or possibly in the past had an unbroken distribution in central and southern Texas.

The iNaturalist map showing research-grade observations of the species indicates that in Mexico the species occurs in the mountains of the northern part of the country, except for Baja California, all the way south in both the Eastern and Western Sierra Madres, into Oaxaca state.

== Habitat ==
Bletia mexicana mainly occurs within the biome of seasonally dry tropical and subtropical forests.

== Taxonomy ==
The genus name Bletia is named in honor of Luis Blet, a Catalonian apothecary of the eighteenth century who accompanied Ruiz and Pavón on their New World explorations.

The species name mexicana reflects that by far the greatest part of the species' distribution lies in Mexico.
