= Andreettaea perangusta =

Scientific classification
- Kingdom: Plantae
- Clade: Tracheophytes
- Clade: Angiosperms
- Clade: Monocots
- Order: Asparagales
- Family: Orchidaceae
- Subfamily: Epidendroideae
- Genus: Andreettaea
- Species: A. perangusta

Binomial name
- Andreettaea perangusta (Luer) A.Doucette

Synonyms
- Muscarella perangusta (Luer) Luer; Pleurothallis perangusta Luer (1976) (basionym); Specklinia perangusta (Luer) Pridgeon & M.W.Chase

Species of plant

Andreettaea perangusta is a species of flowering plant in the orchid family. It is an epiphyte native to Napo Province of Ecuador.
