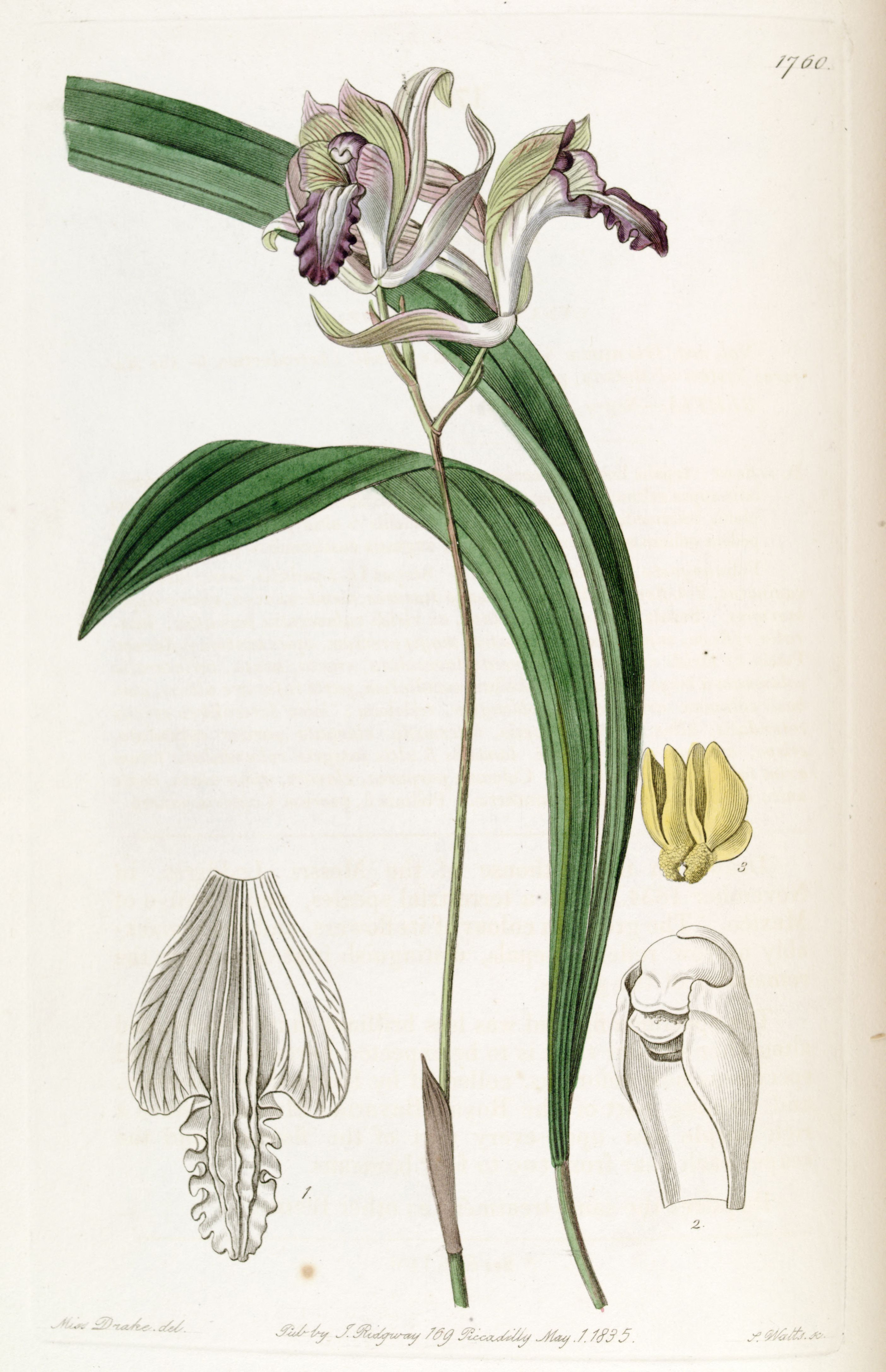
- 1836 illustration Edwards's Botanical Register

Scientific classification
- Kingdom: Plantae
- Clade: Tracheophytes
- Clade: Angiosperms
- Clade: Monocots
- Order: Asparagales
- Family: Orchidaceae
- Subfamily: Epidendroideae
- Genus: Bletia
- Species: B. reflexa

Binomial name
- Bletia reflexa Lindl.

Synonyms
- Bletia jucunda Linden & Rchb.f.

= Bletia reflexa =

Species of orchid

Bletia reflexa is a species of orchid native to Guatemala, Honduras, Chiapas, Oaxaca and Panama.
