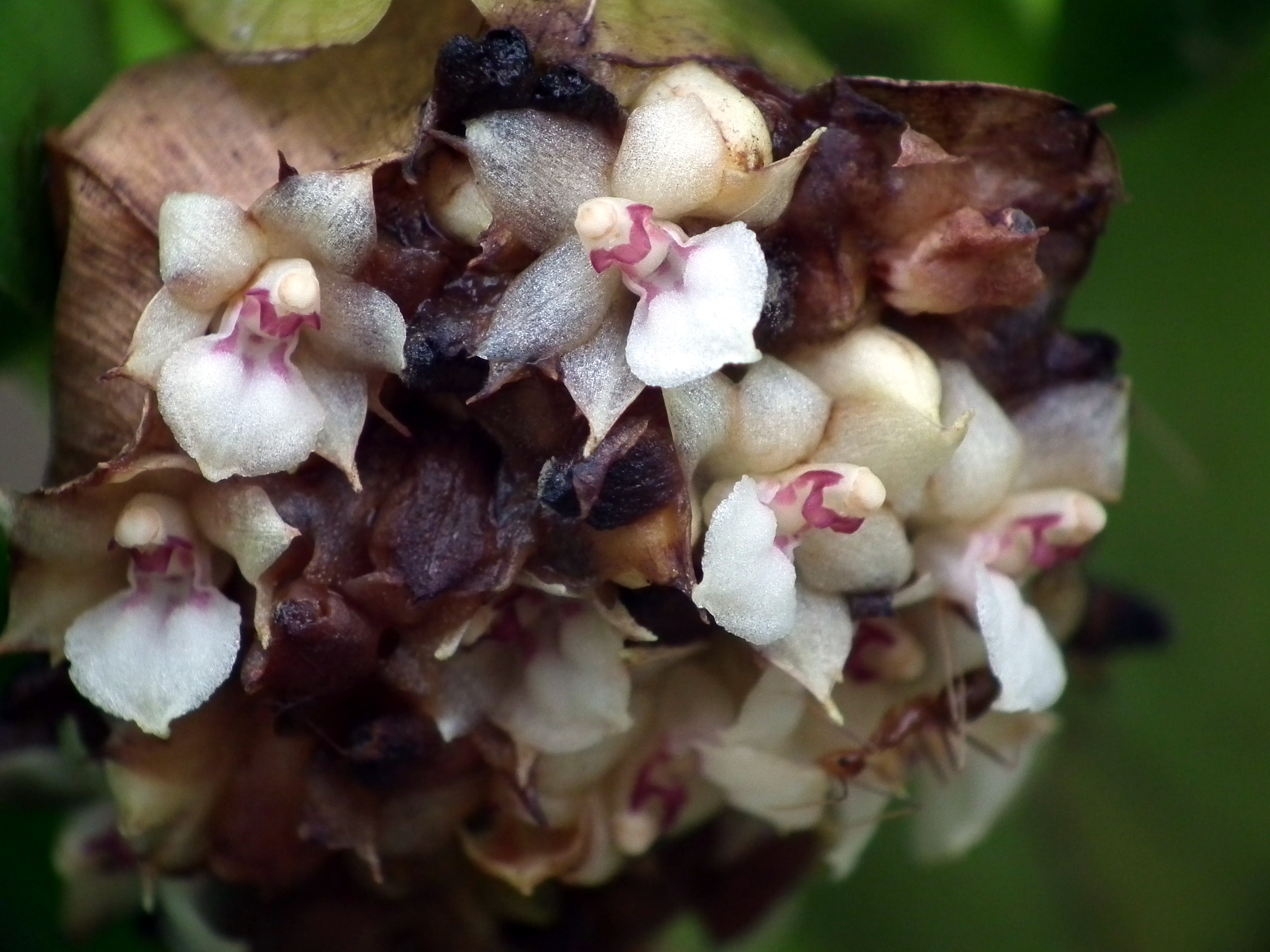

Scientific classification
- Kingdom: Plantae
- Clade: Tracheophytes
- Clade: Angiosperms
- Clade: Monocots
- Order: Asparagales
- Family: Orchidaceae
- Subfamily: Epidendroideae
- Genus: Agrostophyllum
- Species: A. philippinense

Binomial name
- Agrostophyllum philippinense Ames

= Agrostophyllum philippinense =

Species of orchid

Agrostophyllum philippinense is a species of orchid in the genus Agrostophyllum that was first described by Oakes Ames in 1910. It is endemic to the Philippines.
