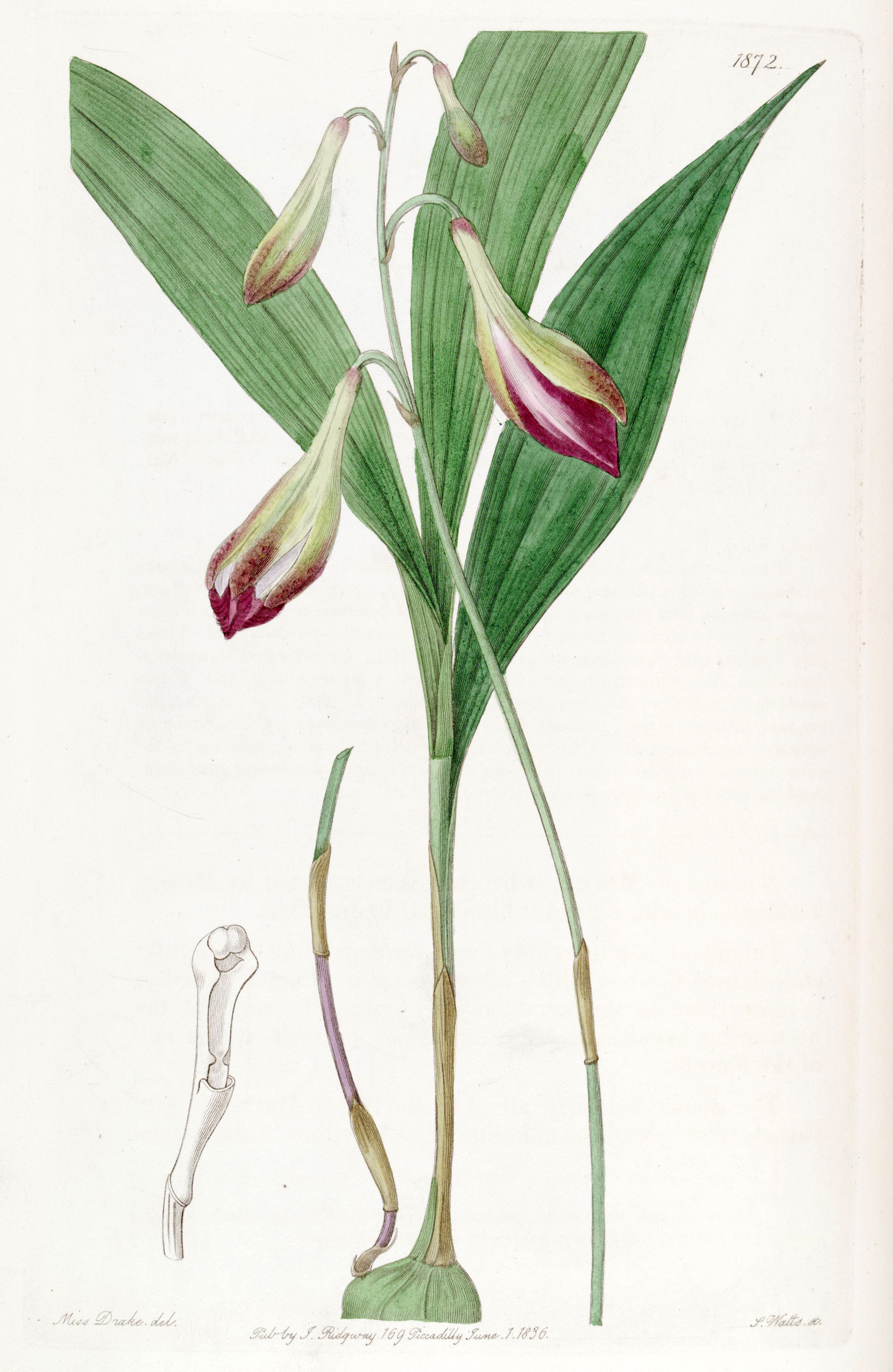
- 1836 illustration Edwards's Botanical Register

Scientific classification
- Kingdom: Plantae
- Clade: Tracheophytes
- Clade: Angiosperms
- Clade: Monocots
- Order: Asparagales
- Family: Orchidaceae
- Subfamily: Epidendroideae
- Genus: Bletia
- Species: B. purpurata

Binomial name
- Bletia purpurata Ruiz & Pav.

Synonyms
- Arethusa tigridiifolia Lex.; Crybe rosea Lindl.; Laelia purpurata var. praetexta Rchb.f.; Arethusa rosea (Lindl.) Benth. ex Hemsl.; Arethusa grandiflora S.Watson; Bletia rosea (Lindl.) Dressler

= Bletia purpurata =

Species of orchid

Bletia purpurata is a species of orchid widespread across much of Mexico and Central America, from Nicaragua to Tamaulipas, Sinaloa and Baja California Sur.
