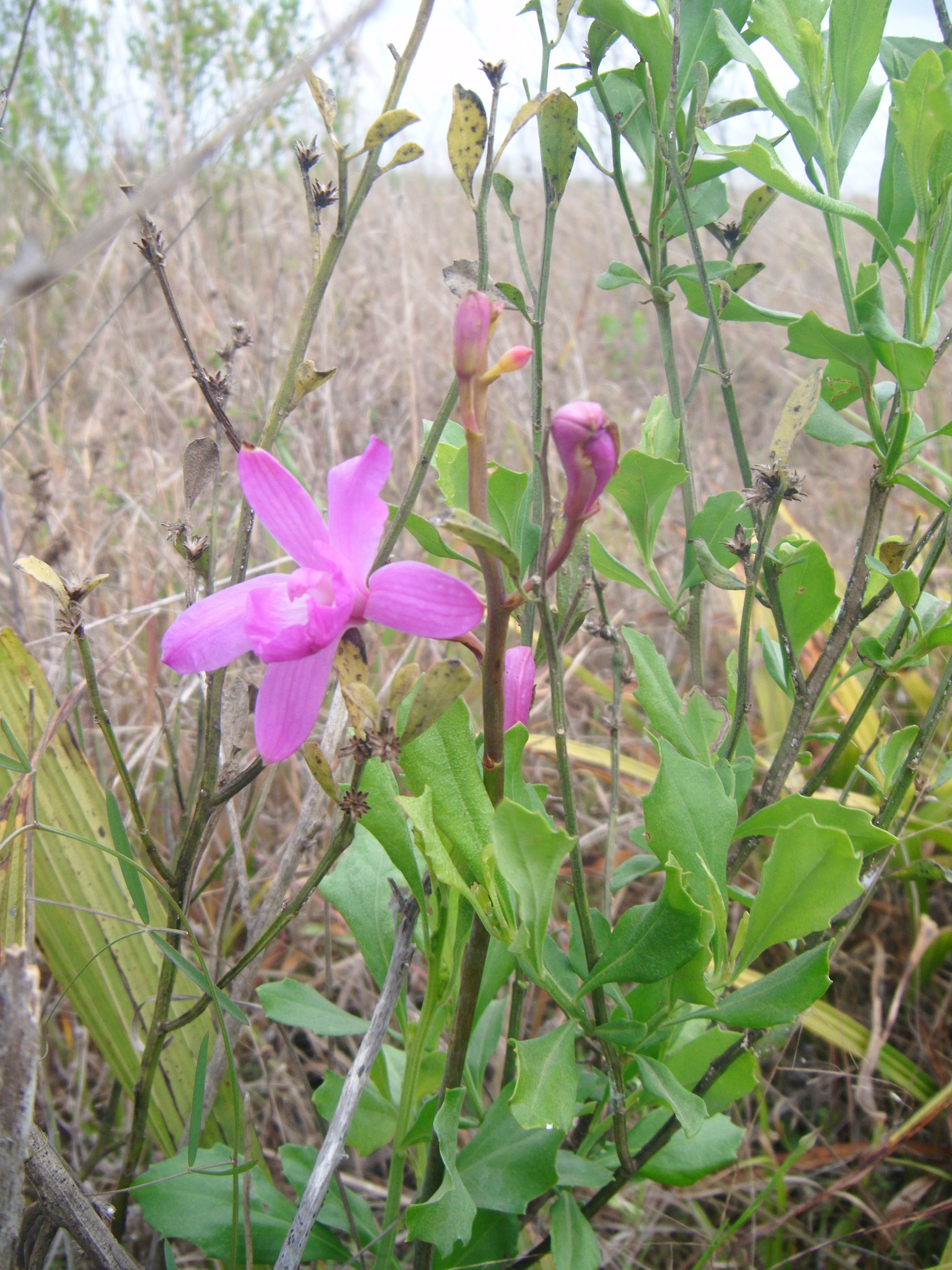
- In Everglades National Park

Scientific classification
- Kingdom: Plantae
- Clade: Embryophytes
- Clade: Tracheophytes
- Clade: Spermatophytes
- Clade: Angiosperms
- Clade: Monocots
- Order: Asparagales
- Family: Orchidaceae
- Subfamily: Epidendroideae
- Genus: Bletia
- Species: B. patula

Binomial name
- Bletia patula Hook.

Synonyms
- Bletia patula var. alba A.D. Hawkes (1950)

= Bletia patula =

Haitian pine-pink

Species of orchid

Bletia patula, common name Haitian pine-pink or flor de pasmo, is a species of orchid. It is native to Florida, Cuba, Hispaniola, Puerto Rico and the Lesser Antilles.
