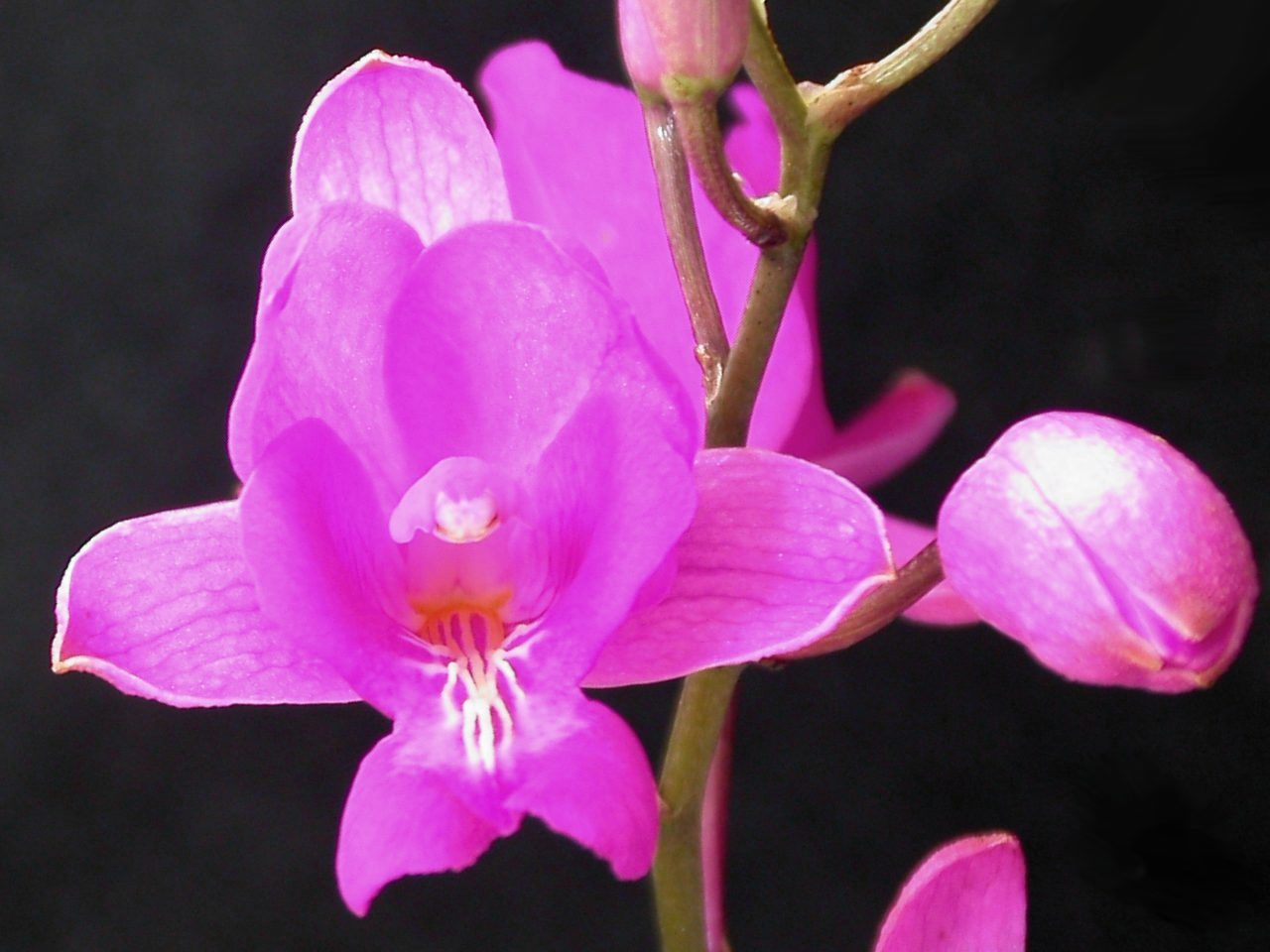

Scientific classification
- Kingdom: Plantae
- Clade: Tracheophytes
- Clade: Angiosperms
- Clade: Monocots
- Order: Asparagales
- Family: Orchidaceae
- Subfamily: Epidendroideae
- Genus: Bletia
- Species: B. catenulata

Binomial name
- Bletia catenulata Ruiz & Pav.

Synonyms
- Bletia catenulata f. alba (L.C.Menezes) Meneguzzo; Bletia catenulata var. alba L.C.Menezes; Bletia catenulata var. caerulea L.C.Menezes; Bletia catenulata f. caerulea (L.C.Menezes) F.Barros & J.A.N.Bat.; Bletia ecuadorensis Schltr.; Bletia repanda Ruiz & Pav.; Bletia rodriguesii Cogn.; Bletia sanguinea Poepp. & Endl.; Bletia sherrattiana Bateman ex Hook.f.; Epidendrum octandrum Vell.; Epistephium herzogianum Kraenzl.; Regnellia purpurea} Barb.Rodr.

= Bletia catenulata =

Species of plant

Bletia catenulata is a species of orchid in the family Orchidaceae. It is native to Ecuador, Peru, Brazil, Colombia, Bolivia and Paraguay.
