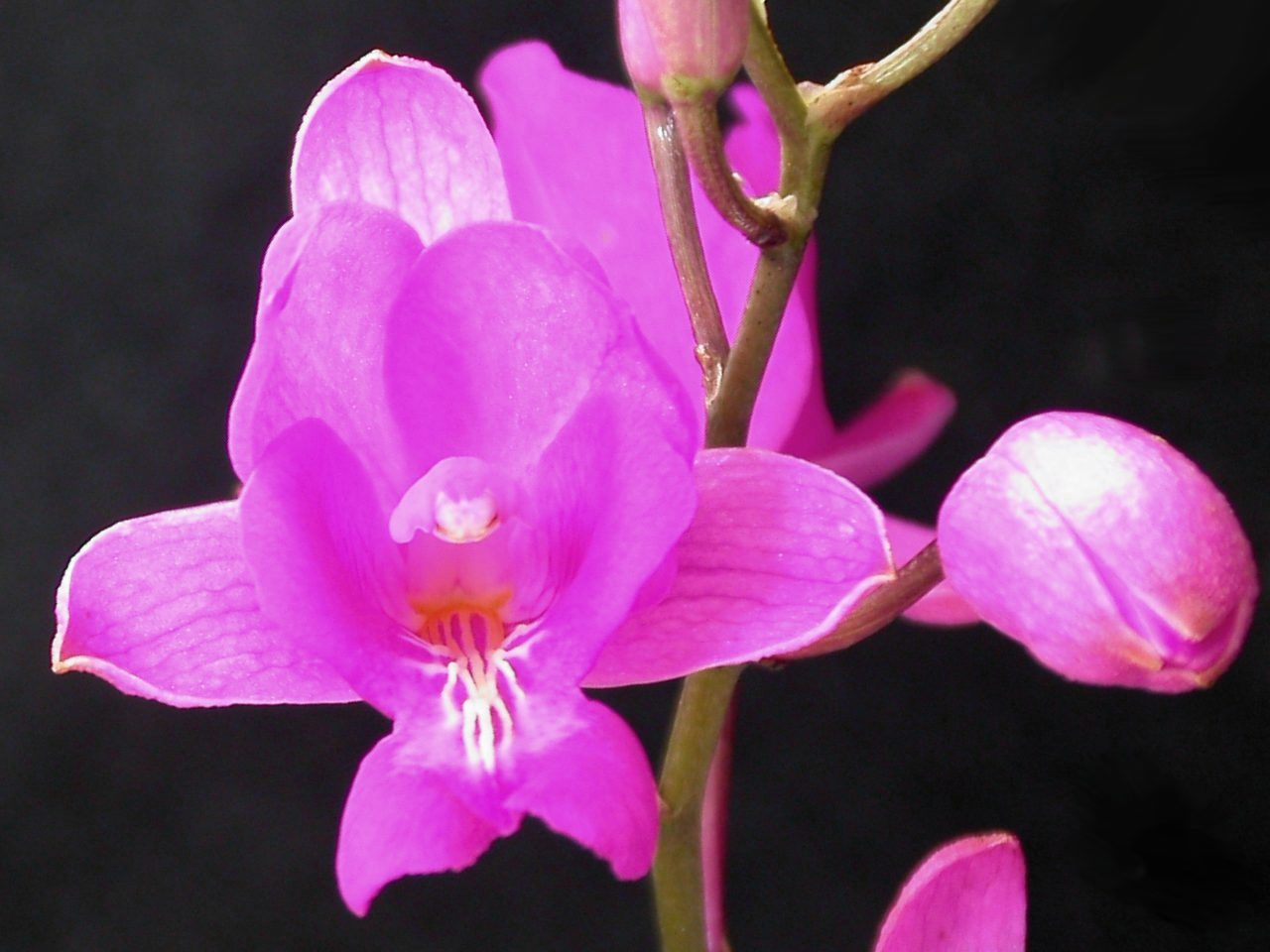
- Bletia catenulata flower

Scientific classification
- Kingdom: Plantae
- Clade: Tracheophytes
- Clade: Angiosperms
- Clade: Monocots
- Order: Asparagales
- Family: Orchidaceae
- Subfamily: Epidendroideae
- Tribe: Epidendreae; Lindl.

Subtribes
- See text
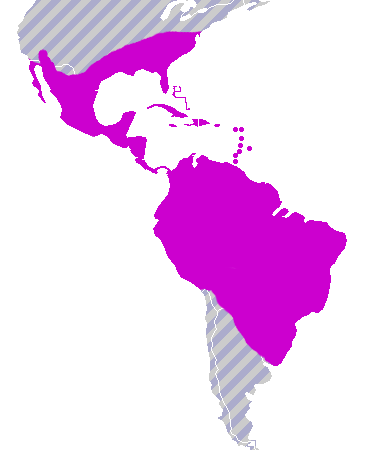
- Range of the Epidendreae

Synonyms
- Bletieae; Laelieae; Pleurothallideae

= Epidendreae =

Tribe of orchids

The tribe Epidendreae of the Orchidaceae, within the subfamily Epidendroideae, includes six subtribes, approximately 120 genera, and over 6,000 species. Popular among orchid collectors, it features well-known genera such as Laelia, Cattleya, and Encyclia, as well as smaller species like Dracula, Dryadella, Masdevallia, and Restrepia.

== Phylogeny ==
The phylogenetic relationships within Epidendroideae are complex, particularly between the Tribes Epidendreae and Arethuseae. Analyses using DNA sequencing models and parsimony methods reveal some consensus but lack conclusive results for certain relationships. Most orchid classifications based on morphology separate the Tribes Epidendreae and Arethuseae, following the taxonomy in Genera Orchidacearum, which recognizes Arethuseae as an independent tribe.

The tribe comprises six subtribes:

- Agrostophyllinae
- Bletiinae
- Calypsoinae
- Laeliinae
- Pleurothallidinae
- Ponerinae

Phylogenetic relationships of Epidendreae subtribes
- Epidendreae
  - - Agrostophyllinae Szlach.
  - - - Calypsoinae E.G.Camus
      - - Bletiinae Benth.
        - - Ponerinae Pfitzer
          - - Laeliinae Benth.
            - Pleurothallidinae Lindl. ex G.Don
