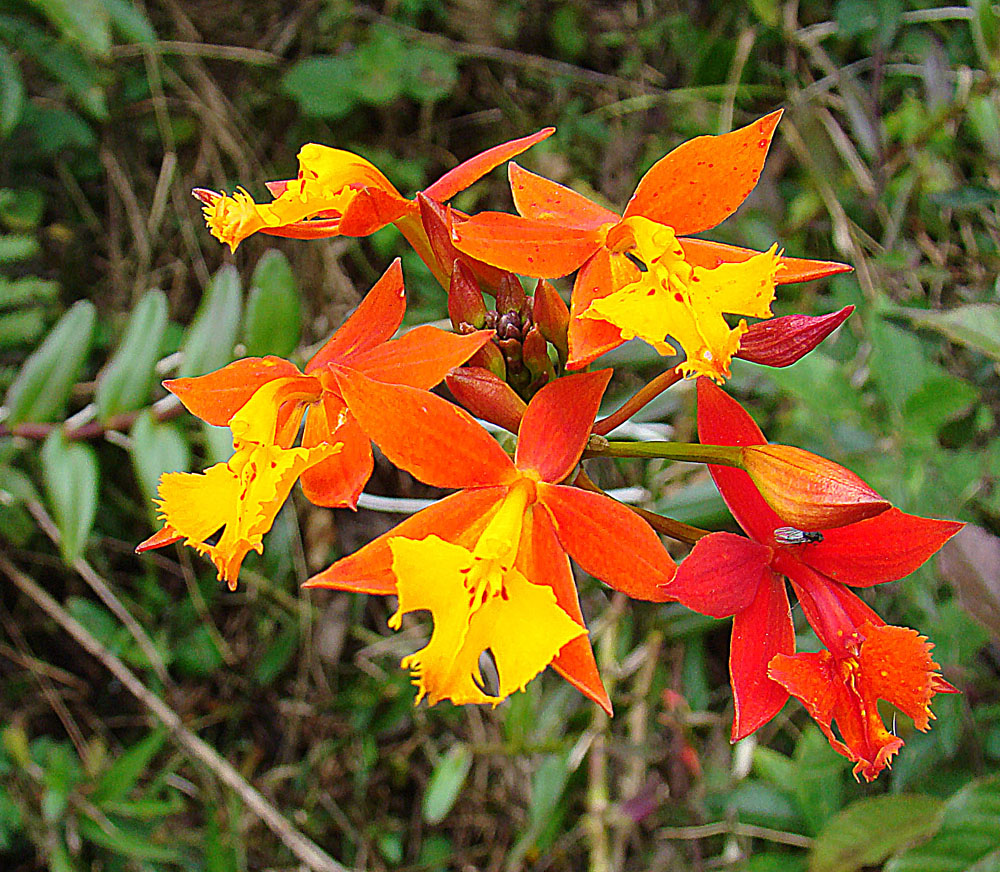

Scientific classification
- Kingdom: Plantae
- Clade: Tracheophytes
- Clade: Angiosperms
- Clade: Monocots
- Order: Asparagales
- Family: Orchidaceae
- Subfamily: Epidendroideae
- Genus: Epidendrum
- Subgenus: Epidendrum subg. Amphiglottium
- Section: Epidendrum sect. Schistochila
- Subsection: Epidendrum subsect. Carinata
- Species: E. radicans

Binomial name
- Epidendrum radicans Lindl.

= Epidendrum radicans =

Species of orchid

Epidendrum radicans is a species of orchid native to Central America and northern South America. Common names include ground-rooting epidendrum, fire-star orchid, crucifix orchid, rainbow orchid, and reed-stem epidendrum.

The diagnostic characteristic of E. radicans is its tendency to sprout roots all along the length of the stem; other crucifix orchids only produce roots near the base. It is a frequent roadside weed at middle elevations in Central America. Its common name 'crucifix orchid' refers to the tiny cross-shaped labellum in the centre of the flower.

== Description ==
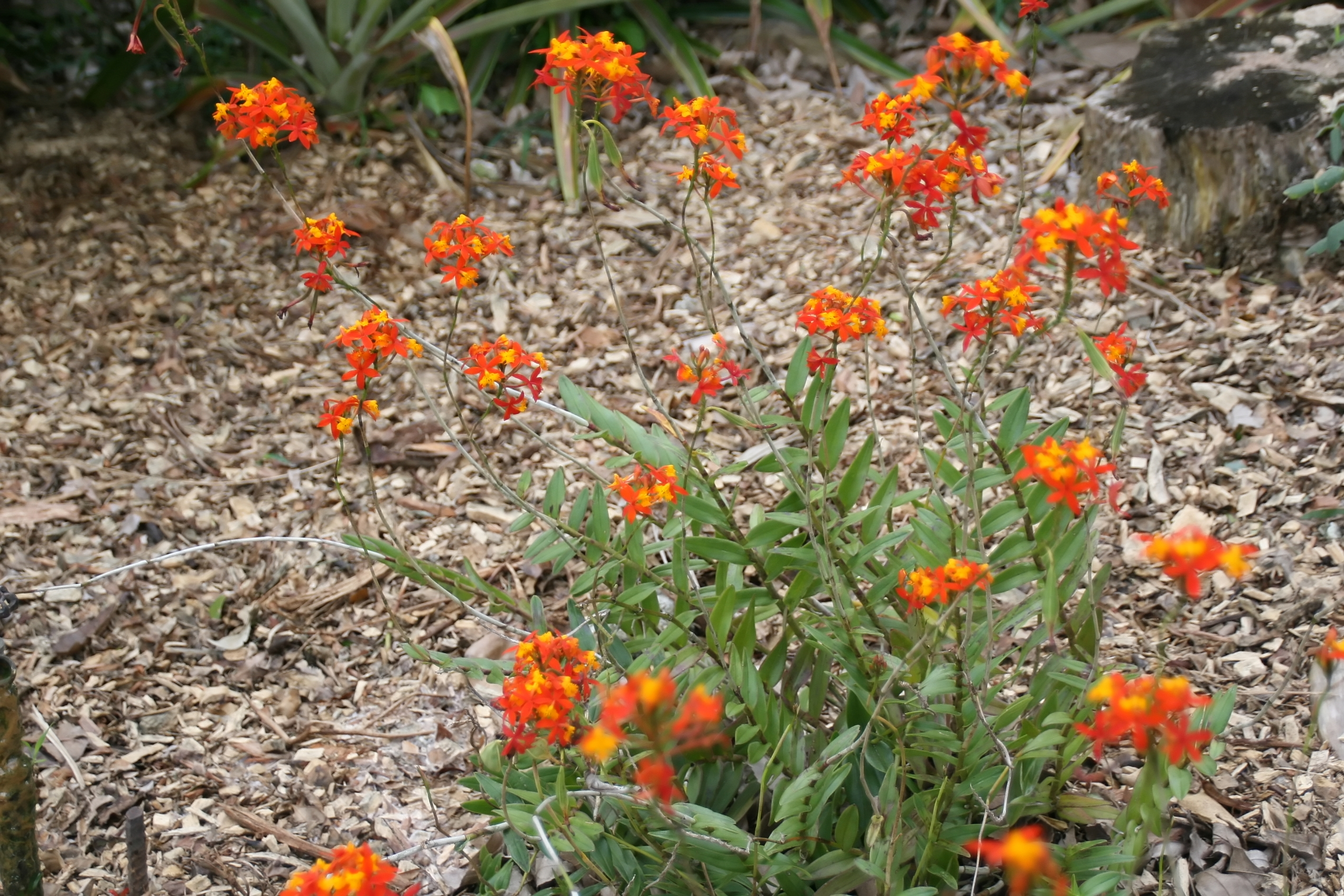
Habitus

It is a herbaceous plant with a terrestrial habit (it grows on the ground, not on trees), generally on rocks, being very variable, with long and fleshy aerial roots that come out of the stems. It reaches a size of up to 1.5 m long. It has a cylindrical, reed-like, straight stem, 19 to 125 cm long and 3.5 to 8 mm in diameter, the main ones lying on the surface, somewhat branched, the branches more or less erect, climbing or also lying down. The leaves are alternate, the blades ovate-elliptic, shortly mucronate at the apex (tip of leaf), 2 to 9 cm long and 1.2 to 2.5 cm long, thick, with a leathery consistency, with the base embracing the stem, sometimes somewhat purple.

Like other members of subgenus Amphiglottium, it is a sympodial orchid which grows stems which do not swell into pseudobulbs and are covered with imbricating sheaths, produces a terminal inflorescence covered at its base by close imbricating sheaths, and produces a lip adnate to the column to its apex. The lip of E. radicans is trilobate, as with the other members of section Schistochila, with the lacerate lobes which are typical of the subsections Carinata and Tuberculata. E. radicans differs from the other lacerate Schistochila by producing roots from most of the stem.

=== Inflorescences ===
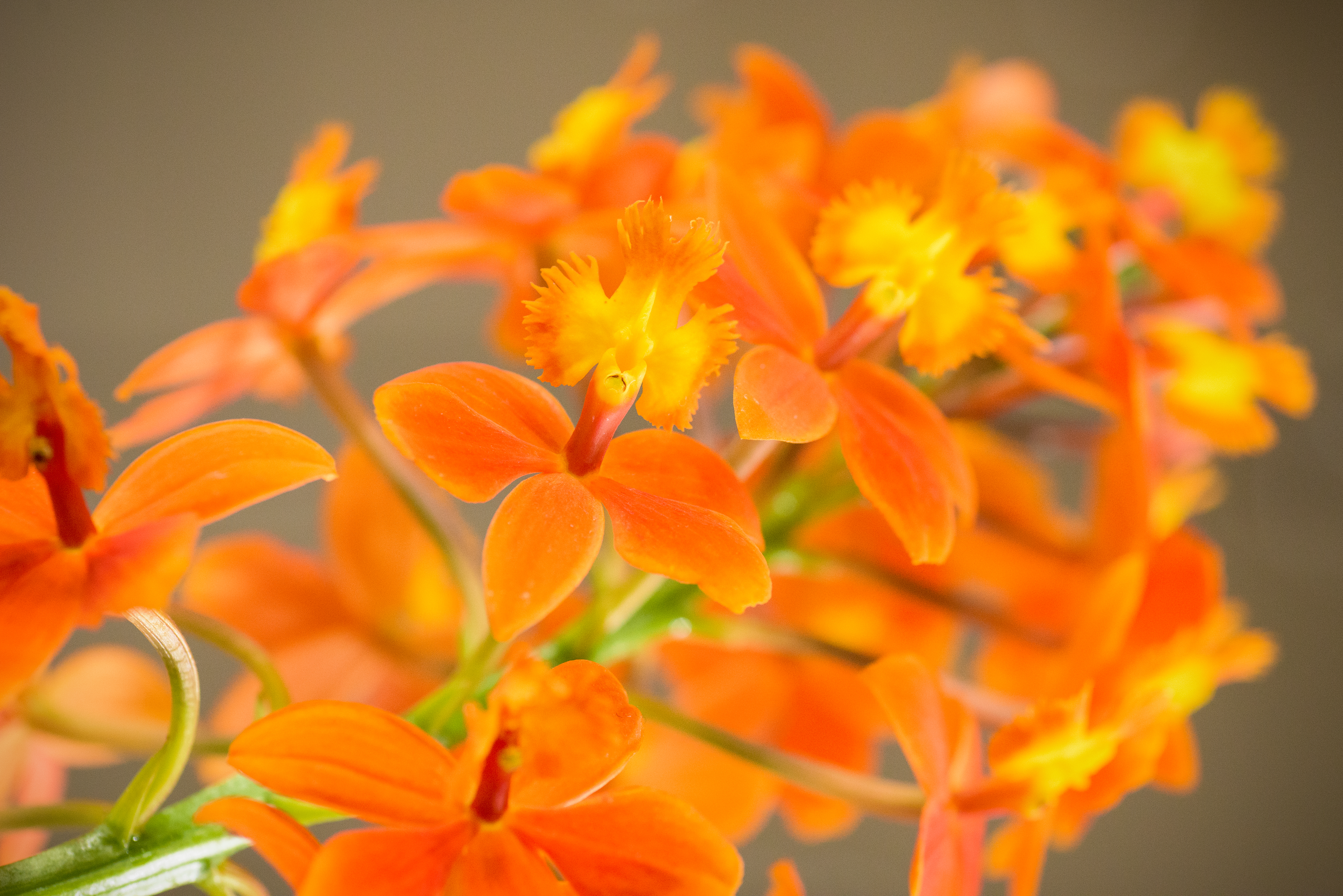
Flowers

The flowers, which appear throughout the year, are produced in the form of long-lived racemes up to 60 cm long, sometimes branched, on long peduncles. At the base of each flower there is a small, triangular bract, which dries up over time. The flowers are large and showy, red-orange in colour and with the tips of some of the petals somewhat yellowish. The three sepals and two of the three petals are very similar, the other petal (called labellum) is very modified, with its basal part narrow and joined to the column (which is a tube formed by the stamens joined to the botany); at the apex the petal widens abruptly and forms 3 lobes with the margin torn; the column (which as already indicated, are the stamens) somewhat curved and dilated towards the apex. Pedicel and ovary are 2–4 cm long. Its fruits are ellipsoid, ribbed capsules, 4.2 to 4.4 cm long and 15 to 21 mm in diameter.

Additionally, E. radicans flowers are resupinate, unlike the members of the Epidendrum secundum complex, E. fulgens, and many other crucifix orchids. E. radicans also differs from E. secundum by bearing no nectar in the flower. E. radicans seeds are quite small, at 320 seeds per milligram.

== Ecology ==
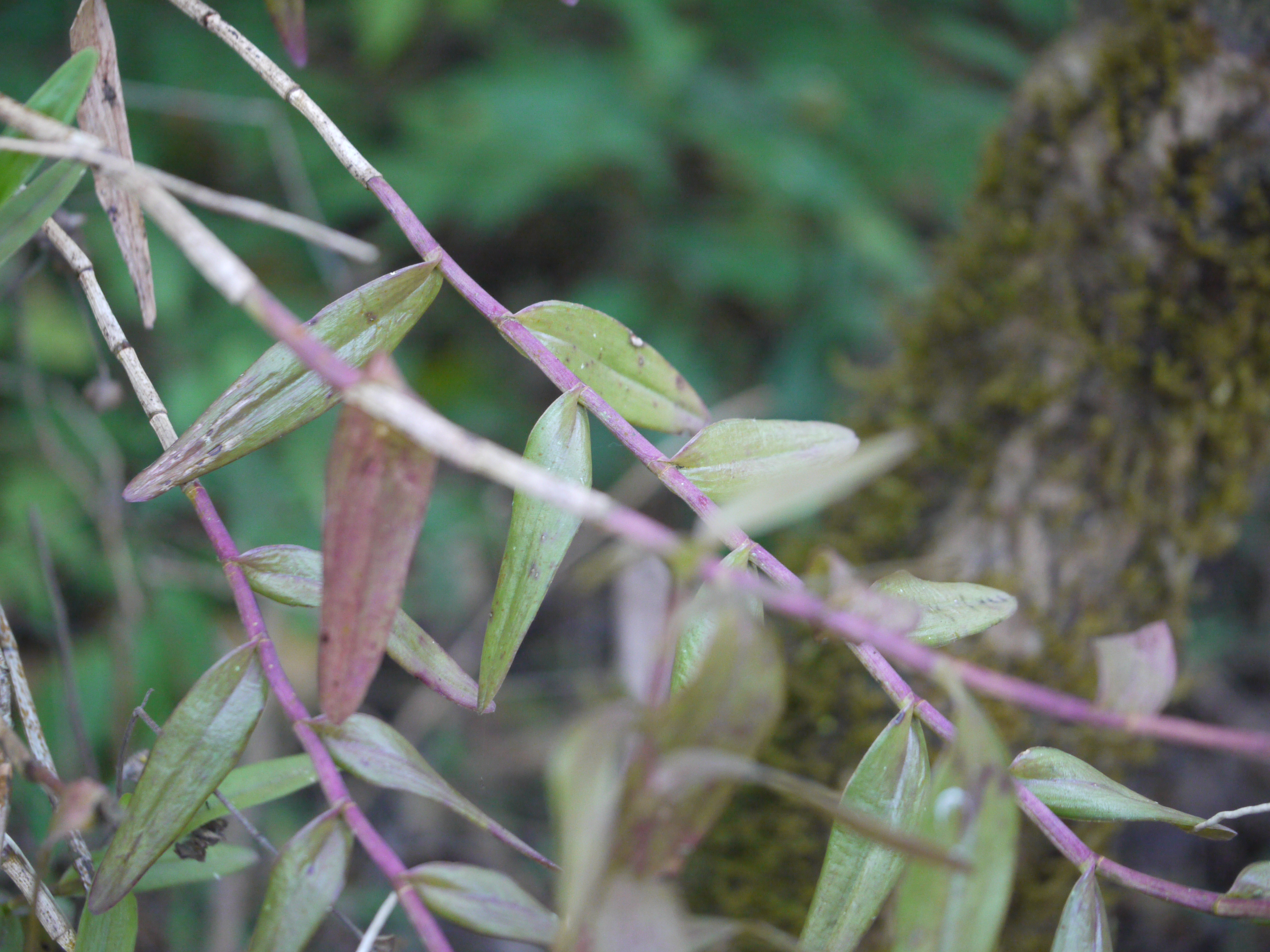
Stems and foliage

It is distributed throughout Mexico, Costa Rica, El Salvador, Guatemala, Honduras, Nicaragua, Panama, Venezuela and Colombia where it is common on rocks in full sun, in the cloud forest of the mountains at altitudes of 900-2500 metres above sea level, oak forest, semi-evergreen forest, riparian vegetation and evergreen scrub.

E. radicans is part of a complex of several orange-flowered, weedy species (including Asclepias spp.) that are unrelated but ecologically similar. Species within this group share pollinators as well as habitat, and are believed to exhibit what is known as convergent evolution, where unrelated species "converge" upon similar physical characteristics as a result of similar evolutionary pressures. Paulette Bierzychudek studied pollinator behavior in the apparent complex consisting of E. radicans, Asclepias curassavica, and Lantana camara, but could not find clear evidence that floral mimicry was affecting pollination rates for any of the three species.

== Cultivation ==
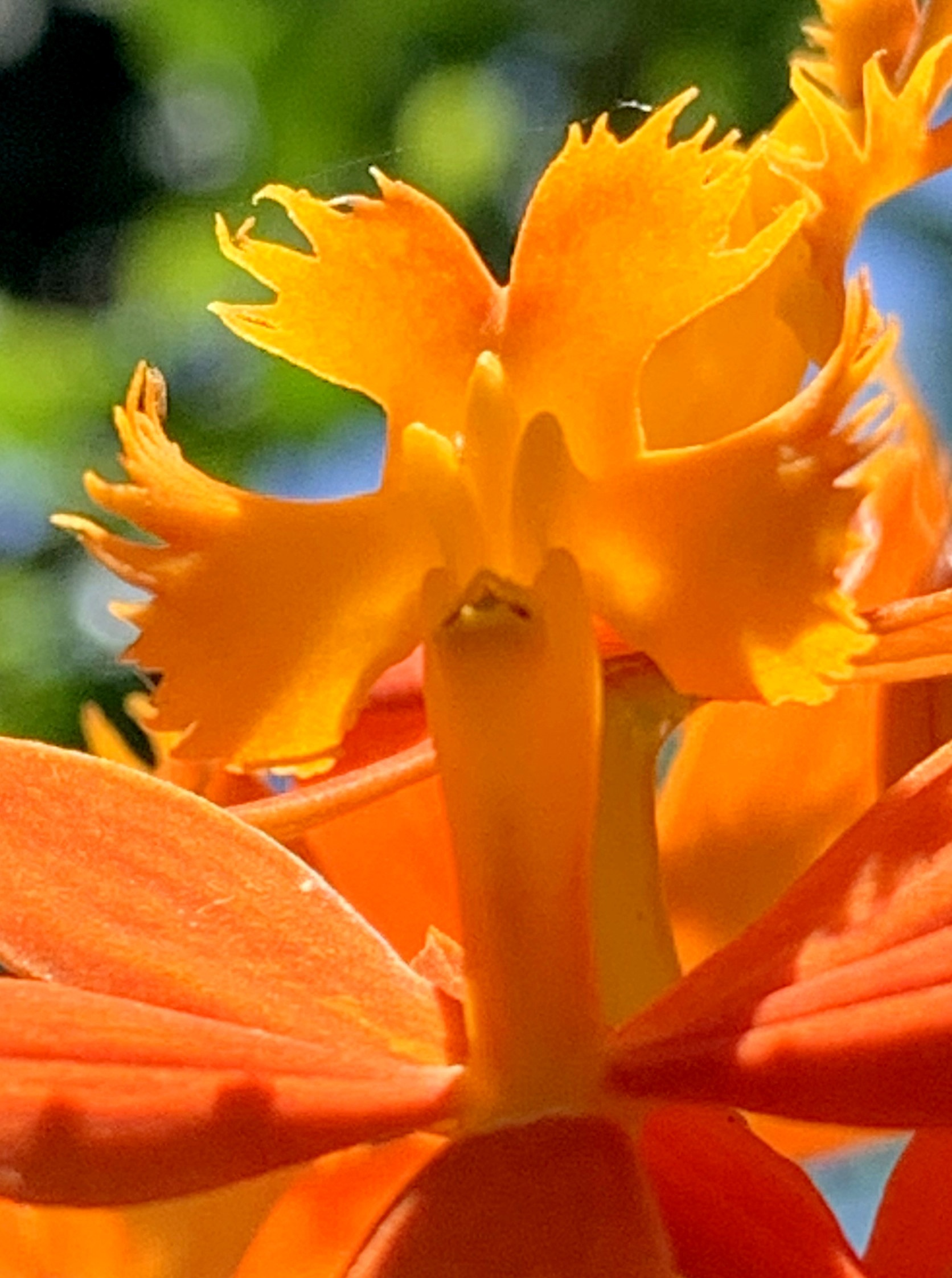
Cross-shaped labellum (flower)

The plant is easily propagated from tip cuttings and pups (keikis) produced on the stems. It thrives in temperatures between 10° and 27°C (50° and 80°F) and in USDA hardiness zone 10–12, under full sun or partial shade in loamy, sandy, well-drained soil. In summers, two hours of direct sunlight may scorch and dehydrate the plant, though the soil must not remain soggy or hold water. It can tolerate low nutrient areas and it does not require extensive maintenance. It can be potted in garden beds and should be potted in large containers (infrequent repotting will restrict its growth and potential blooms). Support may be necessary for a compact, upright growth, though the stems still grow and bloom even if they droop or ramble. A slow-release fertilizer may be necessary for vitality, in addition to mulch (to reduce competition from weeds and to maintain moisture).

Pests include mealybugs, spider mites, scale, thrips, whitefly and root mealybugs. Diseases in cultivation include root rot, leaf spot disease, rust, mosaic virus, black rot, botrytis petal blight, powdery mildew and southern blight. Though generally, the plant is rarely bothered by pests or diseases, as it can adapt to a wide range of conditions compared to other orchid species.

== Taxonomic placement ==
It is a crucifix orchid, often confused with many other members of the section Schistochila, including E. calanthe, E. cinnabarinum, E. denticulatum, E. erectum, E. fulgens, E. ibaguense, E. imatophyllum, E. incisum, E. schomburgkii, E. secundum, and E. xanthinum, among others.

A biochemical examination (Pinheiro & al., 2009) of the lacerate Schistochila subsections encompassing plastid nucleotide sequence data from the trnL—trnF regions, Amplified Fragment Length Polyorphism (AFLP) data, and somatic chromosome number for 30 individuals in three of the thirteen recognized species of E. subsect. Tuberculata and twenty individuals in eleven of the twelve recognized species of E. subsect. Carinata, including E. radicans, has suggested that perhaps E. subsect. Carinata should be replaced with three subsections: an "Atlantic" subsection, an "Andean" subsection, and a monotypic subsection for E. radicans.

The chromosome number of an individual collected in Ecuador has been determined as 2n = 60. Other reported chromosome numbers for E. radicans include 2n = 40, 2n = 57, 2n = 62, and 2n = 64
