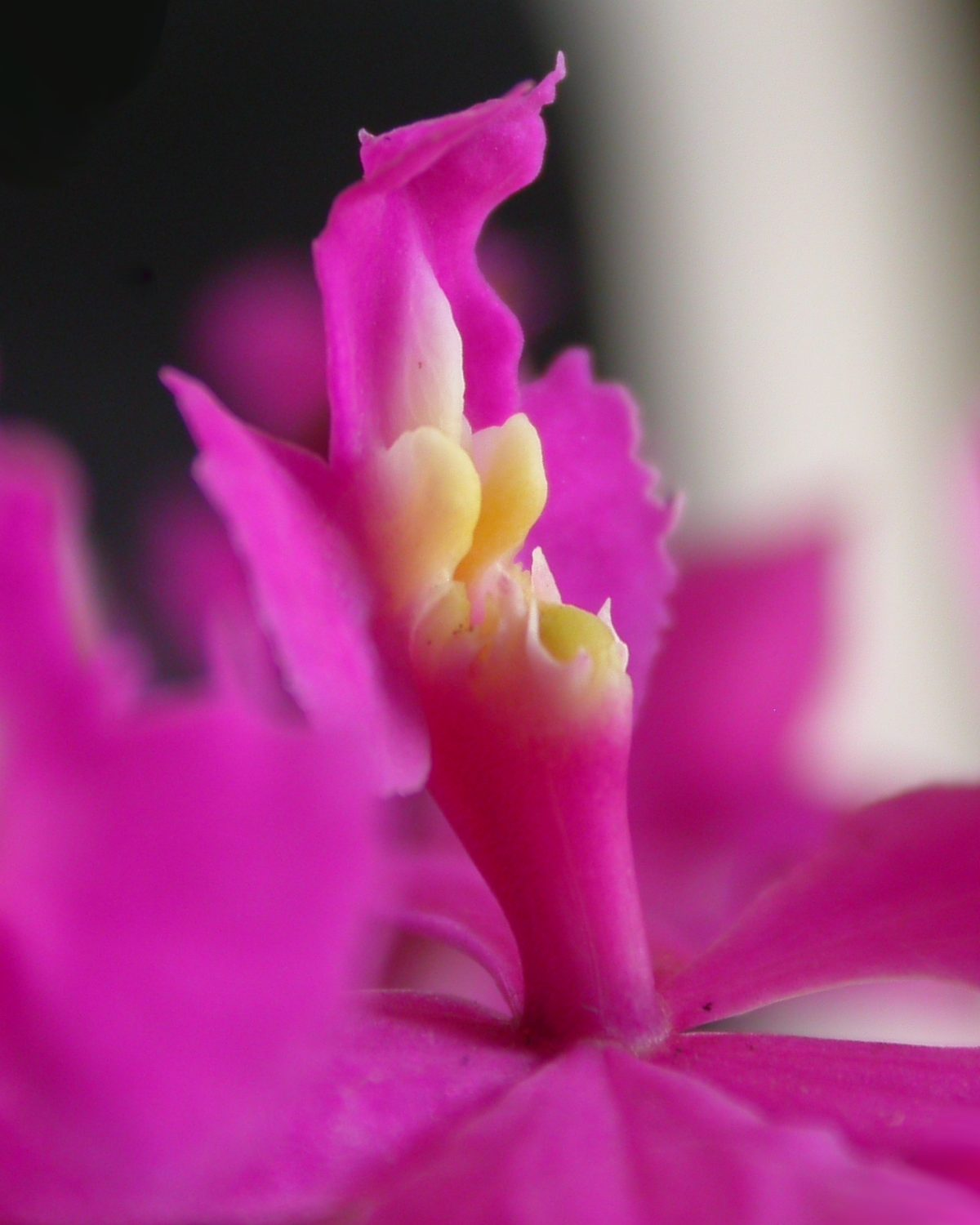
- E. denticulatum lip, showing keel, or carina

Scientific classification
- Kingdom: Plantae
- Clade: Tracheophytes
- Clade: Angiosperms
- Clade: Monocots
- Order: Asparagales
- Family: Orchidaceae
- Subfamily: Epidendroideae
- Genus: Epidendrum
- Subgenus: Epidendrum subg. Amphiglottium
- Section: Epidendrum sect. Schistochila
- Subsection: Epidendrum subsect. Carinata; Rchb.f.

= Epidendrum subsect. Carinata =

Group of orchids

Epidendrum subsect. Carinata Rchb.f. (1861) is a subsection of the section E. sect. Schistochila Rchb.f. (1861) of the subgenus E. subg. Amphiglottium Lindl. (1841) of the genus Epidendrum of the Orchidaceae (orchid family). This subsection differs from the subsection E. subsect. Integra in that the margins of the trilobate lip are dentate or lacerate. This subsection differs from the subsection E. subsect. Tuberculata by possessing a keel or carina on the midlobe of the lip. In 1861, Reichenbach listed nine species in this subsection.

- E. attenuatum Lindl. (1853) (p. 389)
- E. calanthum Rchb.f. & Warsz. (1854) as E. calanthum (p. 390) and E. paytense (p. 391)
- E. cinnabarinum Salzmann ex Lindl. (1831) (p. 389)
- E. imatophyllum Lindl. (1831) (p. 391) As of August 1, 2009, the World Checklist had no entry for this binomial, but accepted E. flexuosum G.Mey. (1818), which Reichenbach 1861 lists as a possible synonym. Kew listed E. imantophyllum with the same reference to Lindley, 1831. Lindley 1831 spells it E. imatophyllum.
- E. fulgens Brogn. (1834) as a synonym of E. schomburgkii var. conflens (p. 389-390)
- E. ibaguense Kunth (1816) as E. decipiens Lindl. (1853) (p. 391) and E. schomburgkii var. conflens (p. 389-390)
- E. macrocarpum A.Rich. (1792) as E. schomburgkii Lindl. (1838) (pp. 389–390)
- E. radicans Pav. ex Lindl.(1831) (p. 390)
- E. spicatum Hook.f. (1851) (p. 389)

E. puniceoluteum was placed in E. subsect. Carinata in its publication as a new species in 2007.

E. denticulatum was also acknowledged to be in E. subsect. Carinata in Pinheiro and Barros 2007.

== Cytology ==
The observed diploid chromosome numbers within Epidendrum subsect. Carinata are rather variable:

- 24 for E. flexuoxum and an individual of E. fulgens described as E. mosenii
- 28 for E. fulgens
- 30 for E. calanthum
- 40 for E. denticulatum and E. radicans
- 52 for E. puniceoluteum
- 60 for E. radicans
- 70 for E. ibaguense and E. radicans
- ~240 for E. cinnabarinum
