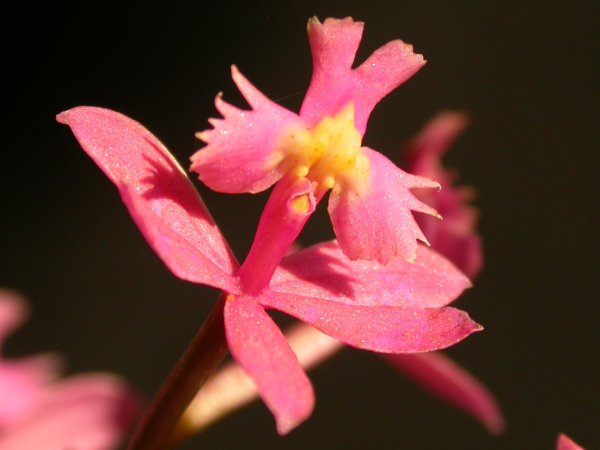
- Epidendrum secundum

Scientific classification
- Kingdom: Plantae
- Clade: Tracheophytes
- Clade: Angiosperms
- Clade: Monocots
- Order: Asparagales
- Family: Orchidaceae
- Subfamily: Epidendroideae
- Genus: Epidendrum
- Subgenus: Epidendrum subg. Amphiglottium
- Section: Epidendrum sect. Schistochila
- Subsection: Epidendrum subsect. Tuberculata

= Epidendrum subsect. Tuberculata =

Group of orchids

Epidendrum subsect. Tuberculata is a subsection of the section Schistochila of the subgenus Amphiglottium Lindl. of the genus Epidendrum of the Orchidaceae. This subsection differs from the subsection Integra in that the margins of the trilobate lip are dentate or lacerate. This subsection differs from the subsection Carinata by possessing a callus, or tubercule on the midlobe of the lip. In 1861, Reichenbach recognized 22 species in this subsection. Many, but not all, have since been brought into synonymy with Epidendrum secundum. (Page numbers refer to Reichenbach, 1861.)

- E. catillus Rchb.f. & Warsz.(1854) (p. 393-394)
- E. cochlidium Lindl. (1841) (p. 393)
- E. dichotomum Presl. (1827) (p. 392)
- E. ellipticum Graham (1826) (p. 395)
- E. ibaguense Kunth (1816) (p. 396)
- E. panchrysum Rchb.f. & Warsz. (1854) (p. 397)
- E. quitensium Rchb.f. (1862) (p. 392)
- E. secundum Jacq.(1760) is not mentioned by name in Reichenbach 1861; the following synonyms (according to Kew) are:
  - E. ansiferum Rchb.f. & Warsz. (1854) (pp. 394–395)
  - E. brachyphyllum Lindl. (1853) (p. 392)
  - E. elongatum Jacq. (1789) (p. 295)
  - E. fastigiatum Lindl. (1853) p. 392 as syn. of E. quitensium Rchb.f.
  - E. fimbria Rchb.f. (1854) (p. 394)
  - E. gracilicaule Rchb.f. & Warsz. (1854) (p. 392)
  - E. incisum Rchb.f. & Warsz. (1854) nom. illeg. (p. 394)
  - E. lacerum Lindl. (1838) (p. 395-396)
  - E. lindenii Lindl. (1845) nom. illeg. (p. 393)
  - E. novogranatense Rchb.f. & Warsz. (1854) (p. 396)
- E. socorrense Rchb.f. (p. 396-397)
- E. spinescens Lindl. (1853) (p. 392)
- E. tricrure Rchb.f. & Warsz. (1854) (p. 396)
- E. xanthinum Lindl. (1844) (p. 395)
- E. xytriophorum Rchb.f. & Warsz. (1854) (p. 394)
