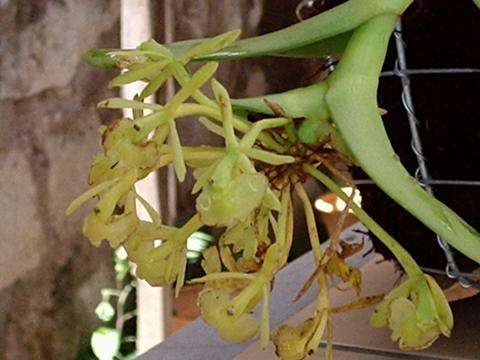
- Epidendrum apaganoides

Scientific classification
- Kingdom: Plantae
- Clade: Tracheophytes
- Clade: Angiosperms
- Clade: Monocots
- Order: Asparagales
- Family: Orchidaceae
- Subfamily: Epidendroideae
- Genus: Epidendrum
- Species: E. apaganoides

Binomial name
- Epidendrum apaganoides D.E.Benn. & Christenson

= Epidendrum apaganoides =

Species of orchid

Epidendrum apaganoides (resembles E. apaganum) is a species of orchid in the genus Epidendrum.
