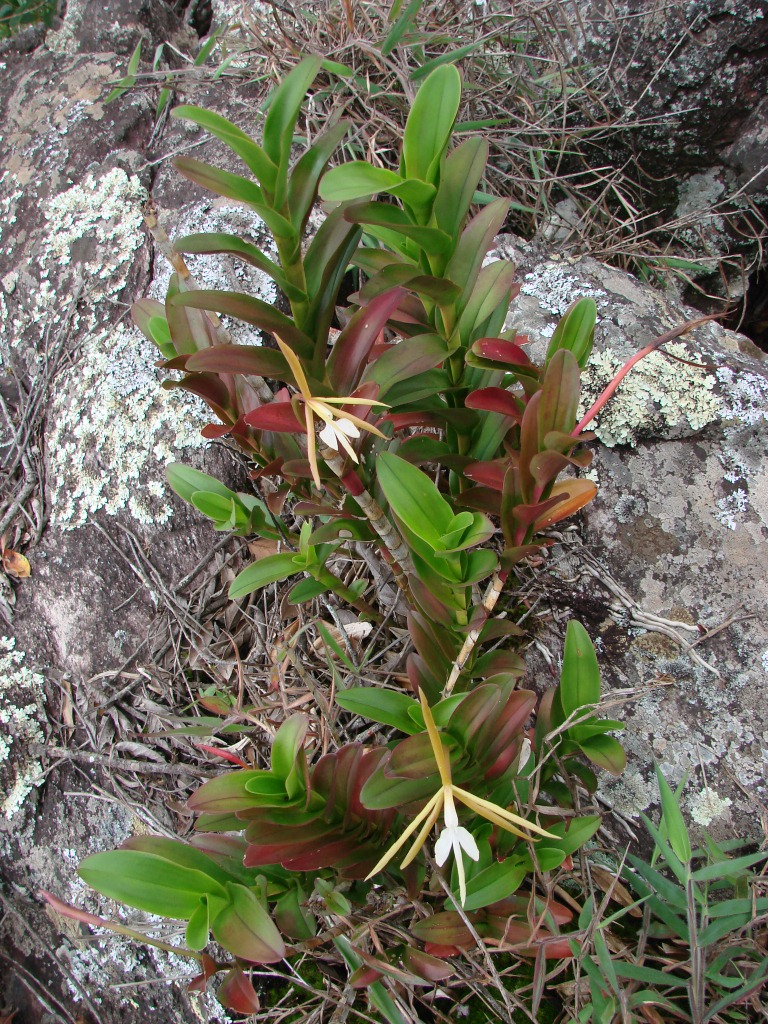

Scientific classification
- Kingdom: Plantae
- Clade: Tracheophytes
- Clade: Angiosperms
- Clade: Monocots
- Order: Asparagales
- Family: Orchidaceae
- Subfamily: Epidendroideae
- Genus: Epidendrum
- Subgenus: Epidendrum subg. Epidendrum
- Section: Epidendrum sect. Planifolia
- Subsection: Epidendrum subsect. Umbellata
- Species: E. nocturnum

Binomial name
- Epidendrum nocturnum Jacq.

Synonyms
- Nyctosma nocturna (Jacq.) Raf. (1837); Epidendrum carolinianum Lam. (1783); Epidendrum discolor A.Rich. & Galeotti (1845); Epidendrum bahiense Rchb.f. (1859); Epidendrum buenaventurae F. Lehm. & Kraenzl. (1899); Auliza nocturna (Jacq.) Small (1913); Epidendrum leucarachne Schltr. (1920); Epidendrum oliganthum Schltr. (1921); Epidendrum nocturnum var. panamense Schltr. (1922); Amphiglottis nocturna (Jacq.) Britton (1924); Epidendrum nocturnum var. minor Schltr. (1924); Epidendrum nocturnum var. angustifolium Stehlé (1939)

= Epidendrum nocturnum =

Species of orchid

Epidendrum nocturnum (the "nocturnal epidendrum") is the type species of the genus Epidendrum of the Orchidaceae (Orchid family). The species occurs in Florida, Bahamas, West Indies, Belize, Central America to northern Brazil and the Guyanas. Epidendrum nocturnum is common in South Florida.

It is usually autogamous (flowers self-pollinate) and sometimes cleistogamous (flowers self-pollinate before they open).

The haploid chromosome number of E. nocturnum has been determined as n = 20. The diploid chromosome number has been determined both as 2n = 40 and as 2n = 80.

In 1984, the variety E. nocturnum var. guadeloupense was determined to have a diploid chromosome number of 2n = 42—48. On November 7, 2010, Kew did not recognize the existence of this variety in its World Checklist of Selected Plant Families.
