= Monopodial =

Type of vascular plant growth

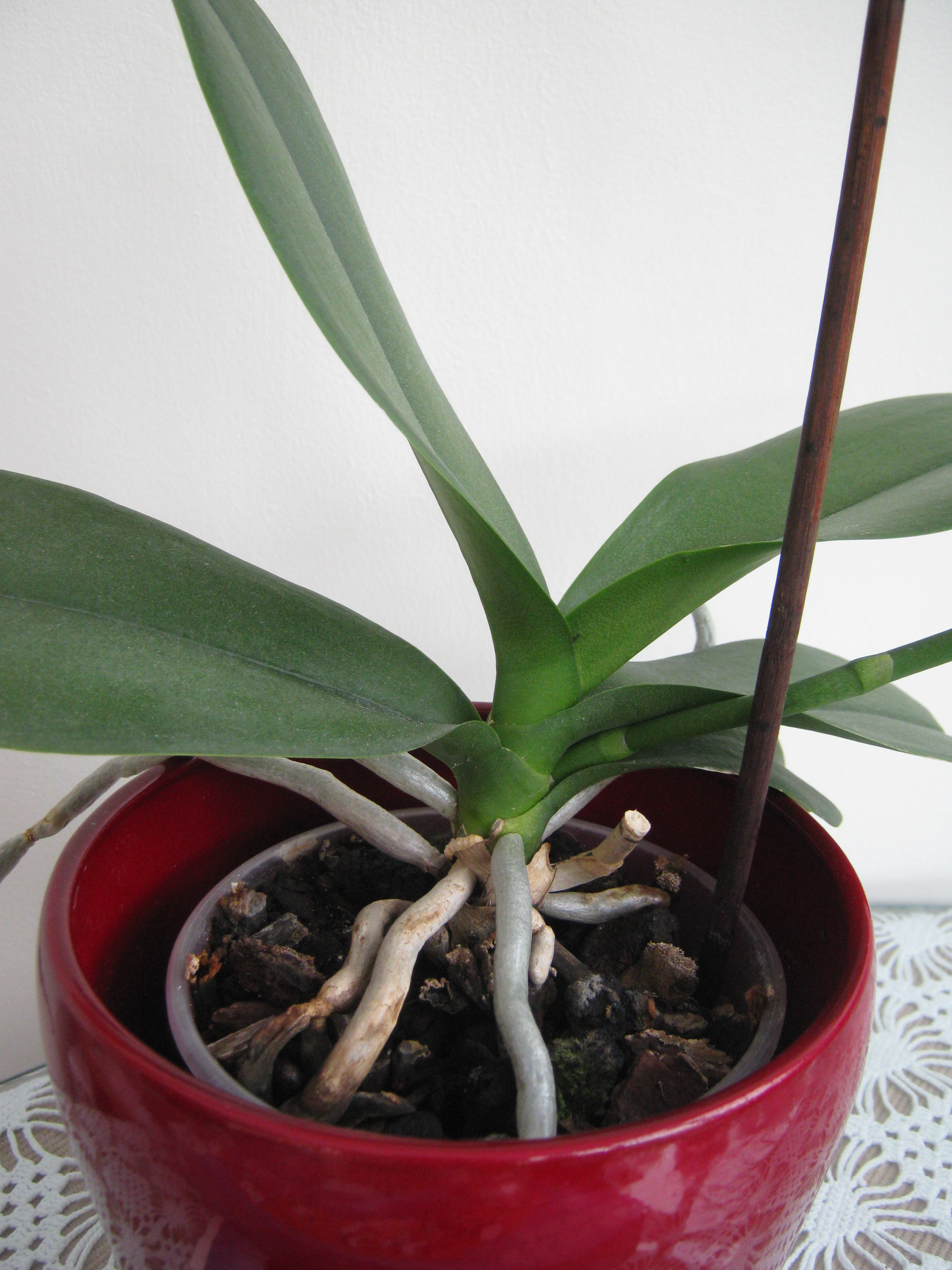
Phalaenopsis orchid showing monopodial form of growth

Vascular plants with monopodial growth habits grow upward from a single point. They add leaves to the apex each year and the stem grows longer accordingly. The word Monopodial is derived from Greek 'mono-', one and 'podial', "foot", in reference to the fact that monopodial plants have a single trunk or stem.

Orchids with monopodial growth often produce copious aerial roots that often hang down in long drapes and have green chlorophyll underneath the grey root coverings, which are used as additional photosynthetic organs. They do not have a rhizome or pseudobulbs so species adapted to dry periods have fleshy succulent leaves instead. Flowers generally come from the stem between the leaves. With some monopodial species, the stem (the rhizome) might fork into two, but for all monopodial orchids this is not necessary for continued growth, as opposed to orchids with sympodial growth.
