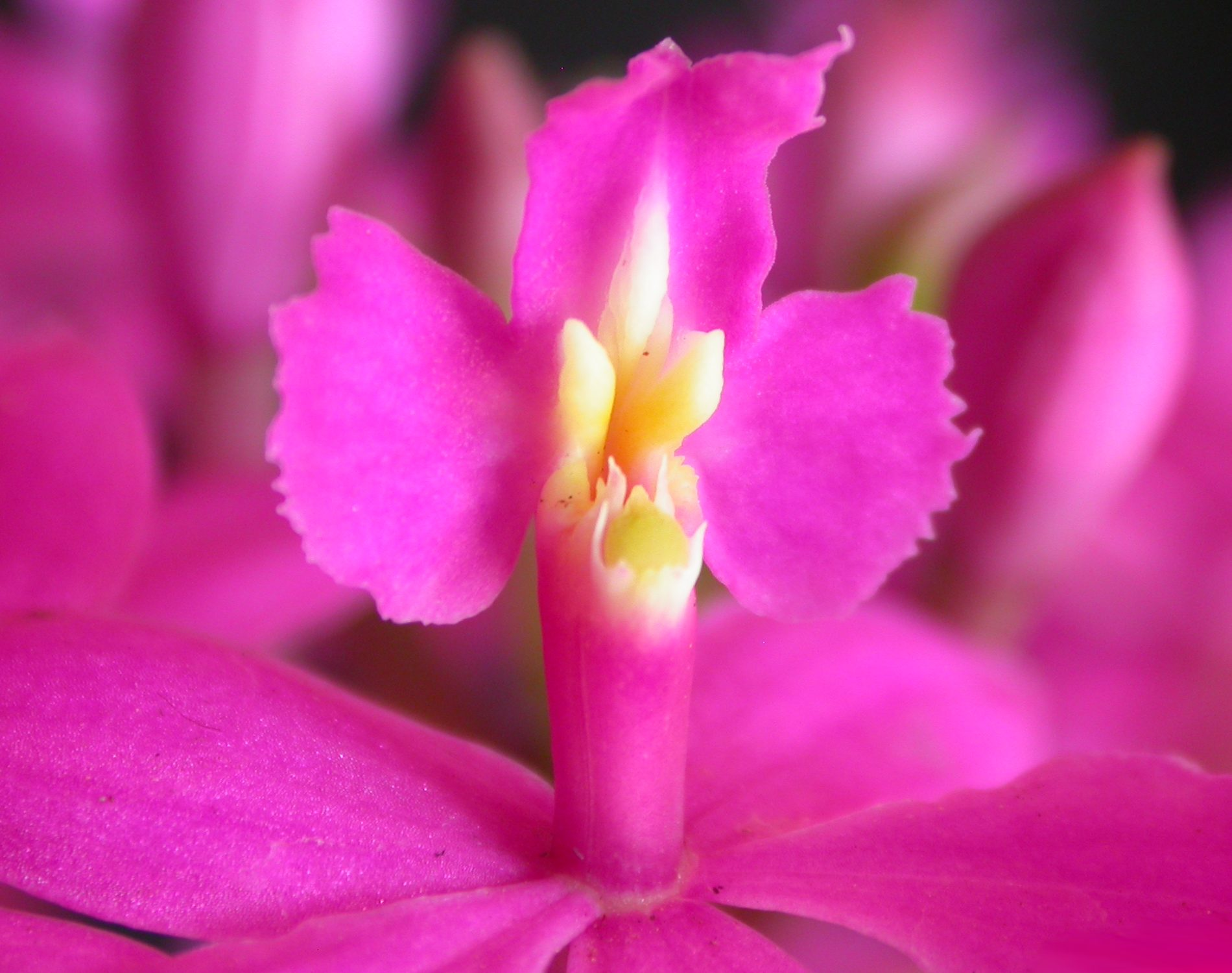
- the trilobate lip of Epidendrum denticulatum

Scientific classification
- Kingdom: Plantae
- Clade: Tracheophytes
- Clade: Angiosperms
- Clade: Monocots
- Order: Asparagales
- Family: Orchidaceae
- Subfamily: Epidendroideae
- Genus: Epidendrum
- Subgenus: Epidendrum subg. Amphiglottium
- Section: Epidendrum sect. Schistochila; Rchb.f.

= Epidendrum sect. Schistochila =

Group of orchids

Epidendrum sect. Schistochila Rchb.f. (1861) is a section of the subgenus E. subg. Amphiglottium Lindl. (1841) of the Genus Epidendrum of the Orchidaceae. E. sect. Schistochila differs from the section E. sect. Holochila in that the species in E. sect. Holochila have undivided lips; the species in E. sect. Schistochila have lobate lips. The species in both E. sect. Schistochila and E. sect. Holochila have racemose inflorescences, unlike those in E. sect. Polycladia (the other section of E. subg. Amphiglottium), which have truly paniculate inflorescences. Like the other sections of E. subg. Amphiglottium, the members of E. sect. Schistochila are sympodial orchids bearing thin stems with alternate leaves (not pseudobulbs), a long peduncle covered with thin, imbricating sheathes, and a lip adnate to the very end of the column.

== Subsections ==
Reichenbach, 1861, described three subsections of Epidendrum sect. Schistochila:

- E. subsect. Integra ("laciniis omnibus integris . . . . . . . C. Schistochila integra.") lip margins without any crenulation, fimbriation, denticulation, or laceration.
- E. subsect. Carinata ("laciniis laceria, lobo medio lamellato . . . . . . D. Schistochila carinata.") lacerate lip margins, medial lobe of lip with a keel (carina).
- E. subsect. Tuberculata ("laciniis laceria lobo medio nuso basi bicalloso . . E. Schistochila tuberculata") lacerate lip margins, medial lobe of the lip with a large tubercule at the base.

A biochemical examination of the lacerate subsections encompassing plastid nucleotide sequence data from the trnL—trnF regions, Amplified Fragment Length Polyorphism (AFLP) data, and somatic chromosome number for 30 individuals in three of the thirteen recognized species of E. subsect. Tuberculata and twenty individuals in eleven of the twelve recognized species of E. subsect. Carinata suggested the following conclusions:

- The section E. sect. Schistochila is monophyletic;
- The subsection E. subsect. Tuberculata is monophyletic;
- The subsection E. subsect. Carinata is polyphyletic and resolvable into an "Atlantic" and an "Andean" clade;
- The species E. radicans is a sister to the remaining subsections of E. sect. Schistochila.
- The three species of E. subsect. Tuberculata (E. cochlidium, E. secundum, and E. xanthinum) might not be monophyletic.
