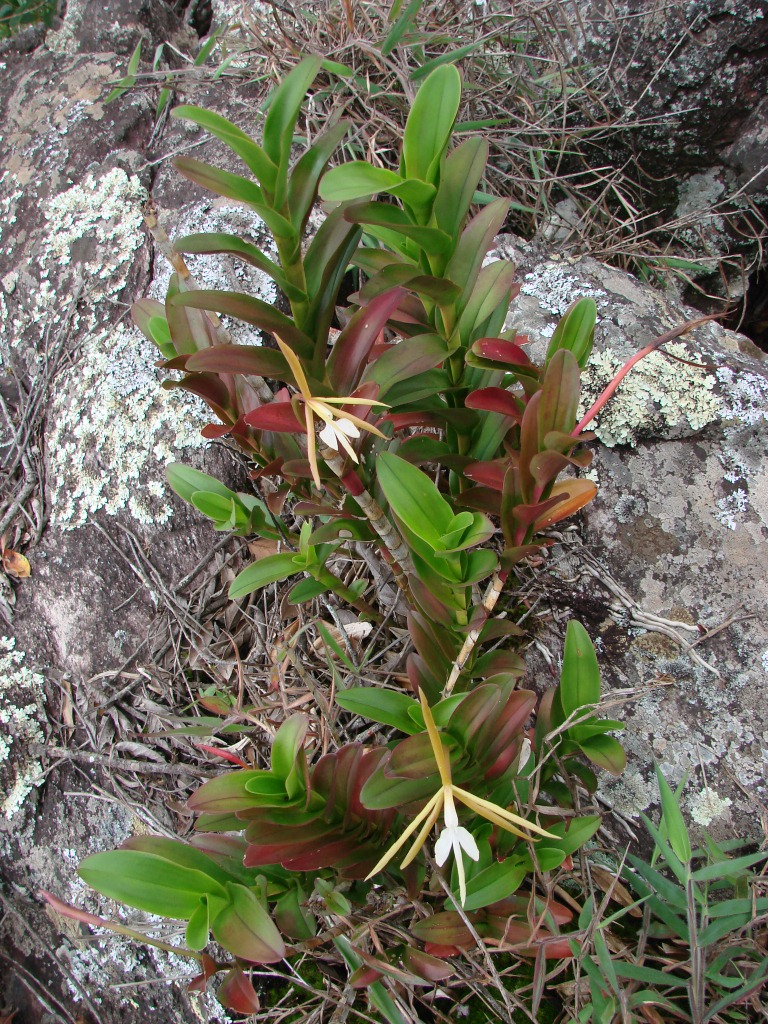
- E. nocturnum

Scientific classification
- Kingdom: Plantae
- Clade: Tracheophytes
- Clade: Angiosperms
- Clade: Monocots
- Order: Asparagales
- Family: Orchidaceae
- Subfamily: Epidendroideae
- Tribe: Epidendreae
- Subtribe: Laeliinae
- Genus: Epidendrum; L., 1763

Type species
- Epidendrum nocturnum Jacq., 1760

Species
- About 1,878 species — see List of Epidendrum species

Synonyms
- Synonymy: Amblostoma Scheidw.; Amphiglottis Salisb.; Anocheile Hoffmanns. ex Rchb.; Auliza Salisb.; Coilostylis Raf.; Didothion Raf.; Diothonea Lindl.; Epidanthus L.O.Williams; Epidendropsis Garay & Dunst.; Exophya Raf.; Gastropodium Lindl.; Hemiscleria Lindl.; Kalopternix Garay & Dunst.; Lanium (Lindl.) Benth.; Larnandra Raf.; Minicolumna Brieger; Nanodes Lindl.; Neolehmannia Kraenzl.; Neowilliamsia Garay; Nyctosma Raf.; Oerstedella Rchb.f.; Phadrosanthus Neck.; Physinga Lindl.; Pleuranthium (Rchb.f.) Benth.; Pseudepidendrum Rchb.f.; Seraphyta Fisch. & C.A.Mey.; Spathiger Small; Spathium Stein; Stenoglossum Kunth; Takulumena Szlach.; Tritelandra Raf.

= Epidendrum =

Genus of orchids

Epidendrum /ˌɛpɪˈdɛndrəm/, abbreviated Epi in the horticultural trade, is a large neotropical genus of the orchid family. With more than 1,500 species, some authors describe it as a mega-genus. The genus name (from Greek επί, epi and δένδρον, dendron, "upon trees") refers to its epiphytic growth habit.

When Carl Linnaeus named this genus in 1763, he included in this genus all the epiphytic orchids known to him. Although few of these orchids are still included in the genus Epidendrum, some species of Epidendrum are nevertheless not epiphytic.

== Distribution and ecology ==
They are native to the tropics and subtropical regions of the American continents, from North Carolina to Argentina. Their habitat can be epiphytic, terrestrial (such as E. fulgens), or even lithophytic (growing on bare rock, such as E. calanthum and E. saxatile). Many are grown in the Andes, at elevations between 1,000 and 3,000 m. Their habitats include humid jungles, dry tropical forests, sunny grassy slopes, cool cloud forests, and sandy barrier islands.

Members of this genus can be very aggressive colonisers of disturbed habitat, and many species which were once rare in this genus have become more common as the result of human activities. For example, some of these plants can be found in greater abundance growing terrestrially along road cuts throughout their native ranges as the result of road construction.

Many of these species are relatively easy to grow in rich humus compost with some sand. The plants resemble Dendrobiums in form and habit typically, although they tend to be terrestrial rather than lithophytic and epiphytic, and do better in a humus rich, well aerated substrate.

Most of the high elevation members of this genus from cloud forests defy cultivation outside their habitat, and it is reported that even moving a plant from one location to another on the same host tree in habitat will result in the death of the plant, possibly due to dependency on a specific mycorrhizal fungal symbiont.

== Characteristics ==
They are quite varied in flower size and appearance. They grow in tufts, in racemose inflorescences, sometimes in corymbs or panicles. The apical, lateral or basal flowers are mostly small to medium in size and frequently are not marked by a conspicuous display. The inflorescences are frequently dense. Many species are fragrant. The flowers may be produced only once, or during several years from the same or new inflorescences. The ellipsoid fruits are 3-ribbed capsules.

This genus has the following characteristics:

- a slit rostellum (small extension or little beak to the median stigma lobe), producing a transparent or white thick and adhesive liquid.
- the sometimes fringed lip is adnate to ( = united with) the column (forming a nectary tube (but rarely producing nectar), continuing through the pedicel). The genus Prosthechea was split off because the lip is not completely adnate to the apex of the column.
- the pollinarium contains four pollinia, sometimes two and rarely eight pollinia, and then four very reduced.
- the erect, pendent, or creeping stems are reed-like, simple or branching, or may be pseudobulbs or thickened stems. (The genus Coilostylis, recently split off from Epidendrum, has pseudobulbs, is an artificial genus and does not stand up to molecular analysis.)

== Synonymy ==
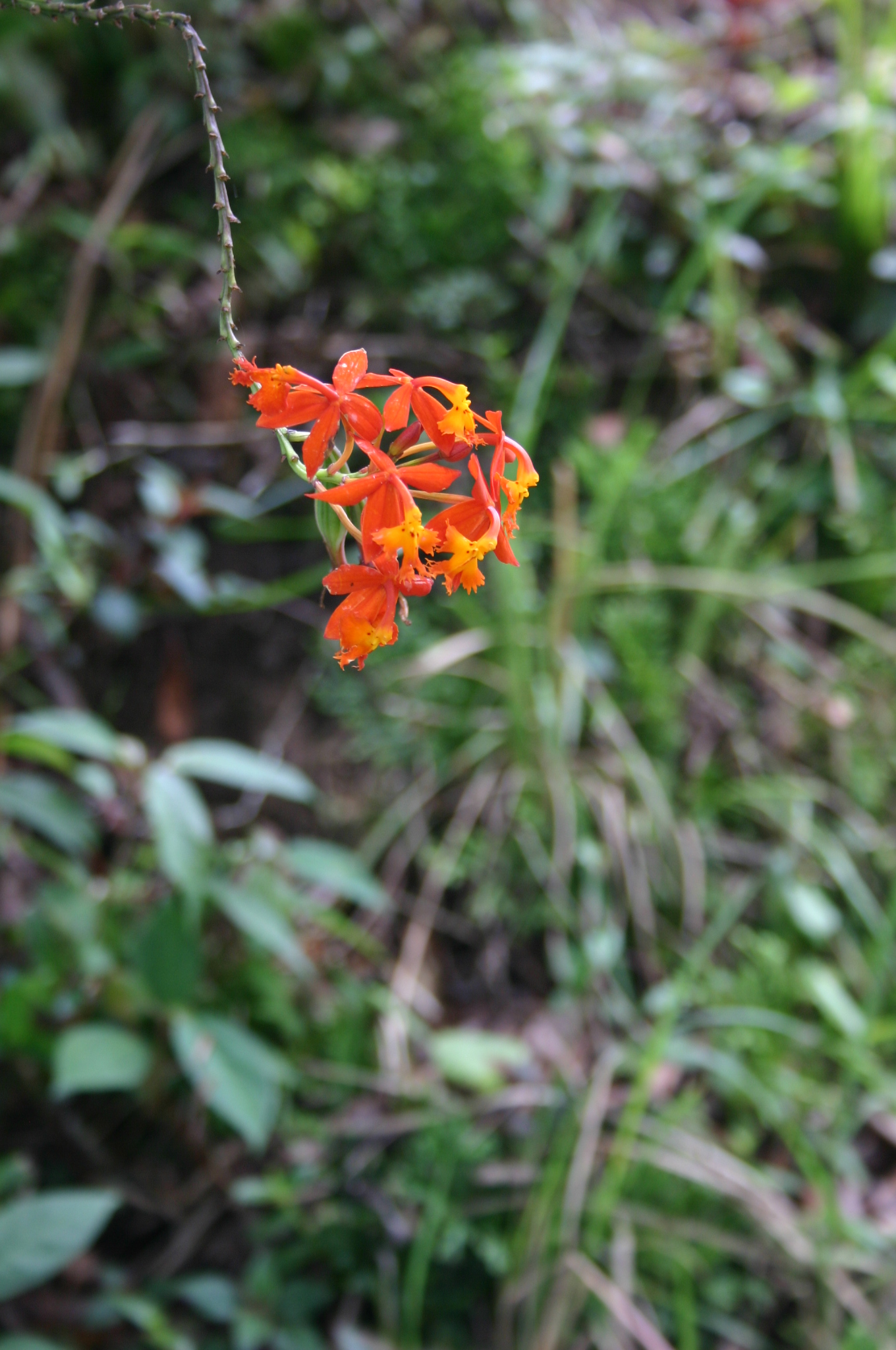
Epidendrum radicans in the wild.

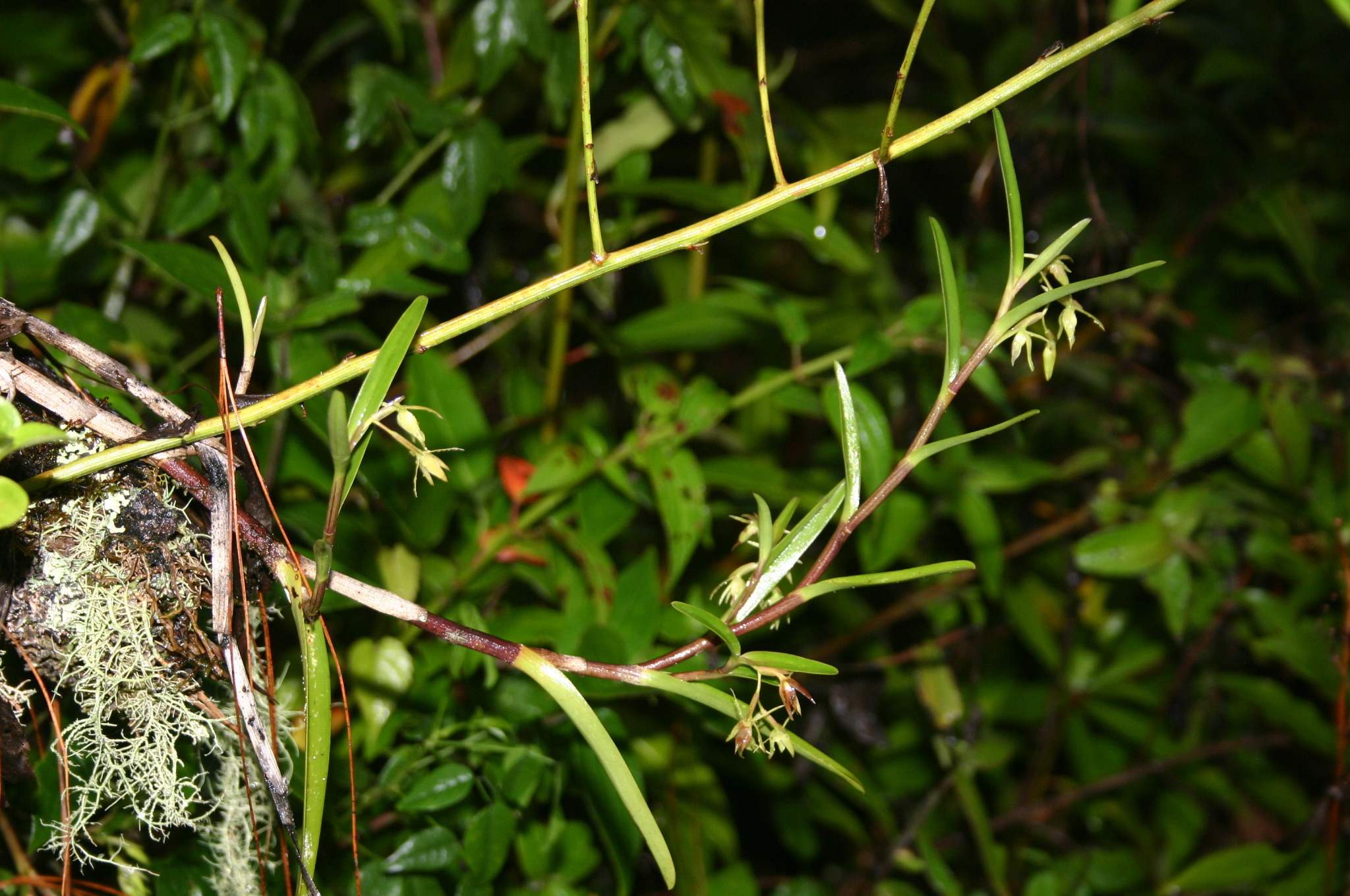
Epidendrum sp. in the wild.

Initially, European taxonomists applied the generic epithet Epidendrum to all newly discovered epiphytic orchids. Gradually, many of these "Epidendrums" were recognized as being quite diverse and deserving of different generic epithets—many belong to different tribes or subtribes (e.g. Vanda). To add to the confusion, however, many descriptions of closely related species were published with different generic epithets.

As if the confusion caused by these publications were not great enough, many closely related genera (or perhaps subgenera, sections, or subsections) have been recognized and published. According to the modern rules of taxonomy, each new proposed genus that is split off from Epidendrum must bear the name of the oldest generic epithet published for a member of the new genus. Hence, many genera which have been brought into synonymy with Epidendrum have later been segregated out again. Because most of these decisions rest on the informed opinions of authorities, the segregated taxa are often then re-published as synonyms. Hence, some of the following information may seem a bit contradictory, especially if the assertion that two names are "synonyms" is misconstrued as an assertion that the two names mean exactly the same thing.

The following genera have been brought into synonymy with Epidendrum:

- Amblostoma Scheidw.
- Amphiglottis Salisb.
- Anocheile Hoffmanns. ex Rchb.
- Auliza Small
- Coilostylis Raf.
- Didothion Raf.
- Diothonea Lindl.
- Epidanthus L.O.Williams
- Epidendropsis Garay & Dunst.
- Exophya Raf.
- Gastropodium Lindl.
- Hemiscleria Lindl.
- Kalopternix Garay & Dunst.
- Lanium (Lindl.) Benth.
- Larnandra Raf.
- Minicolumna Brieger (nom. inval.)
- Nanodes Lindl.
- Neolehmannia Kraenzl.
- Neowilliamsia Garay
- Nyctosma Raf.
- Oerstedella Rchb.f.
- Phadrosanthus Neck. ex Raf.
- Physinga Lindl.
- Pleuranthium Benth.
- Pseudepidendrum Rchb.f.
- Seraphyta Fisch. & C.A.Mey.
- Spathiger Small
- Stenoglossum Kunth
- Takulumena Szlach.
- Tritelandra Raf..

Genera which have been erected (or resurrected) from Epidendrum include the following examples:

- Barkeria Knowles & Westc.
- Dimerandra Schltr.
- Caularthron Raf.
- Encyclia Hook. – This is another "mega-genus" differing from Epidendrum in that the plants are mostly pseudobulbous, and in that the lip "encircles" the column, rather than being adnate. Like Epidendrum, genera have been and are likely to continue to be split off from this genus.
- Microepidendrum Brieger ex W.E.Higgins (2002)
- Oestlundia W.E.Higgins (2002)
- Prosthechea Knowles & Westc. – This debatable genus contains the "cockleshell orchids", with lips which are adnate to the column only about halfway to the apex, and which "encircle" the end of the column. Most of the species of this genus were long classified in Encyclia.
- Psychilis Raf.

== Subgenera ==
- Epidendrum subg. Amphiglottium
- Epidendrum subg. Aulizeum
- Epidendrum subg. Epidendrum
- Epidendrum subg. Hormidium
- Epidendrum subg. Pleuranthium
- Epidendrum subg. Spathium

== Species ==
See List of Epidendrum species for a full list

Epidendrum sensu lato is a huge genus, embracing more than 2,000 binomials (about 1,878 accepted names and the rest have become synonyms of other species). More than 1,000 have been split off into new or resurrected genera. However, it is estimated that there are more than 2,000 Epidendrum orchids, many of which still have to be discovered. More than 400 new species have lately been described by Eric Hágsater and colleagues (see: Reference).

Several botanists have been honored with an Epidendrum orchid named after them, including the following:

- E. carnevalii Hágsater & L.Sánchez, (1999). (named after Carnevali)
- E. dunstervilleorum Foldats, (1967). (named after G.C.K. and E. Dunsterville, husband and wife)
- E. foldatsii Hágsater & Carnevali, (1993). (named after Foldats)
- E. garayi Løjtnant, (1977). (named after Garay)
- E. garciae Pabst, (1976). (named after Garcia-Cruz)
- E. hagsateri Christenson, (1995). (named after Hágsater)
- E. lueri Dodson & Hágsater, (1989). (was named after Dr. Luer of the Missouri Botanical Gardens, author of the series of monographs about the Pleurothallidinae orchids, the Icones Pleurothallidinarum)
- E. schlechterianum Ames, (1924). (named after Rudolf Schlechter)
- E. schweinfurthianum Correll, (1947). (named after Schweinfurth)

== Hybrids ==
Only a few natural hybrids within the genus have been named as species, such as Epidendrum × doroteae, Epidendrum × gransabanense and Epidendrum × purpureum.

Epidendrum orchids hybridize readily with members of other related genera, such as Cattleya (× Epicattleya is the accepted nothogenus for such a hybrid) Brassavola (producing a × Brassoepidendrum). There are also multi-generic hybrids, for example, × Vaughnara is the nothogenus for hybrids containing ancestor species from each of the genera Brassavola, Cattleya, and Epidendrum, but no others.

Hybridization is thought to have a strong influence in diversification of this genus sometimes compromising the genetic integrity of the parental species.

== Culture ==
The flowers of many Epidendrum species are small, but some such as E. ibaguense are showy, and many are widely cultivated, such as E. cinnabarinum, E. ibaguense, E. nocturnum, E. radicans, E. secundum, and a multitude of hybrids of these species.

Most Epidendrum species require cool or intermediate to warm conditions for culture, and the commonly cultivated species, such as E. radicans grow in typically cool conditions. Some, such as E. conopseum (syn. E. magnoliae) can even tolerate extended freezing conditions. In Auckland and other sub-tropical regions of New Zealand, the cool growing plants will flower all year round. While they are normally grown in pots, it is also possible to grow them in a bark garden or on a tree, although the plants prefer a humus rich well-aerated media.

== Gallery ==
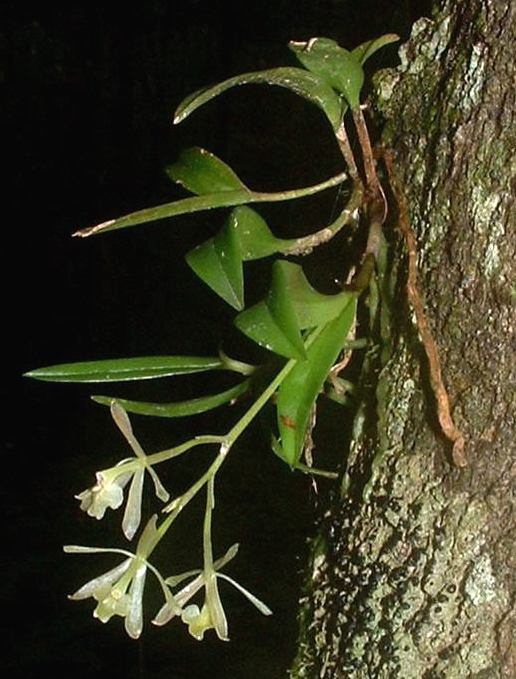
Wild E. conopseum (syn. E. magnoliae), Gadsden Co. FL.

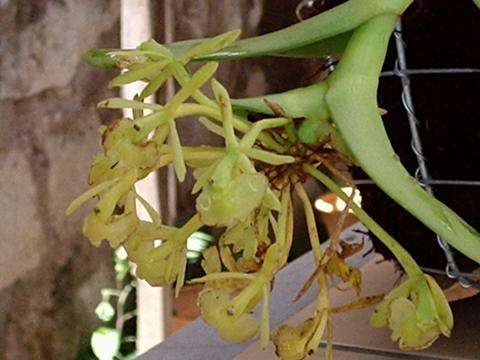
E. apaganoides

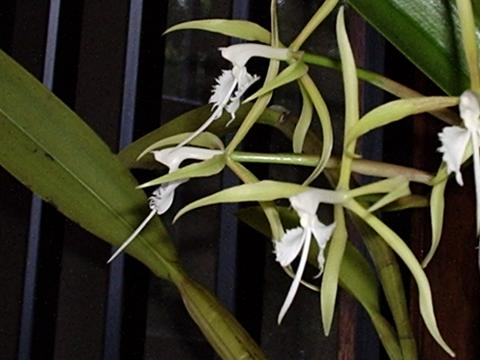
Epidendrum ciliare

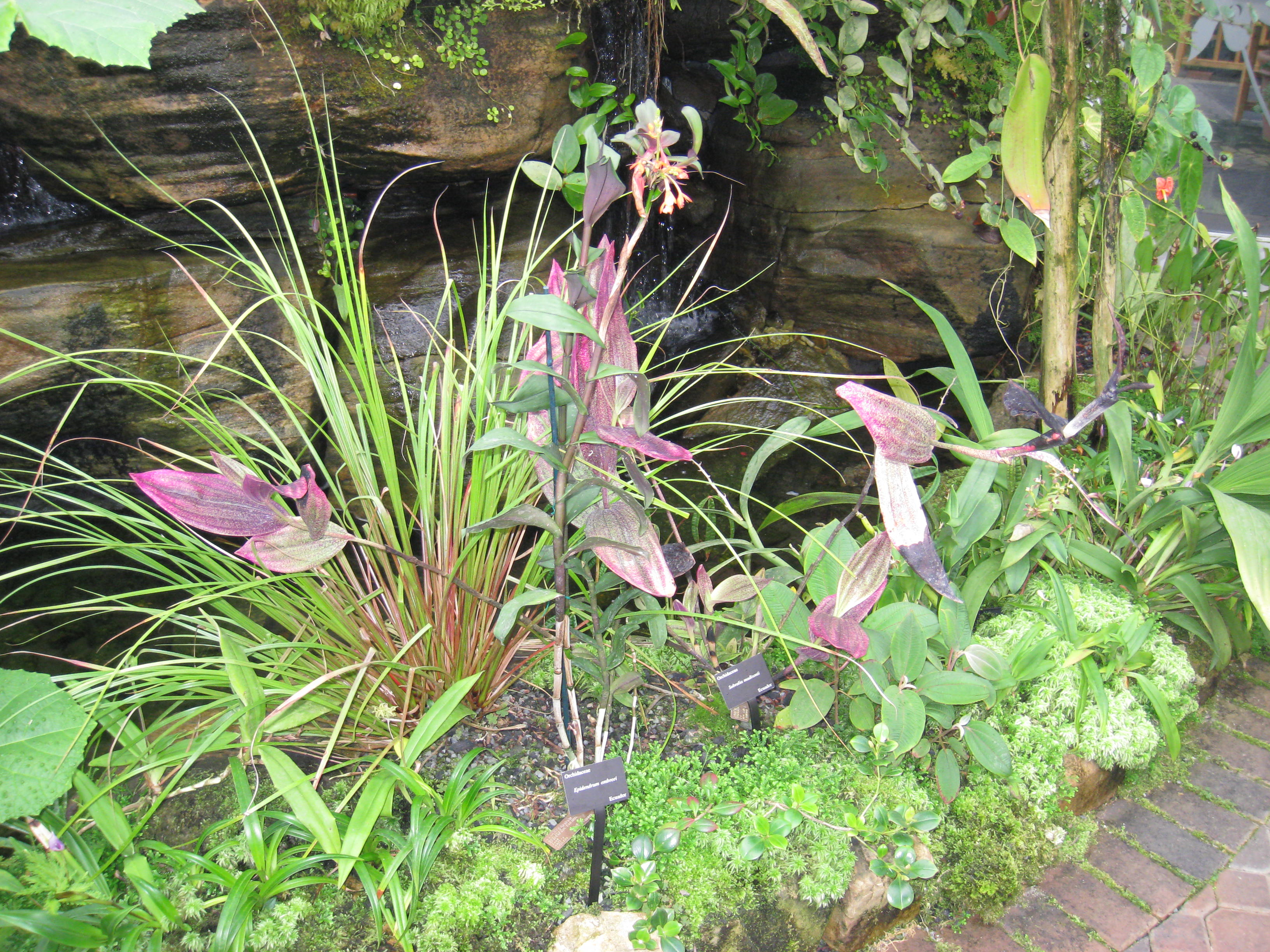
Both orchids found in Ecuador, E. embreci and Sobralia madisonii

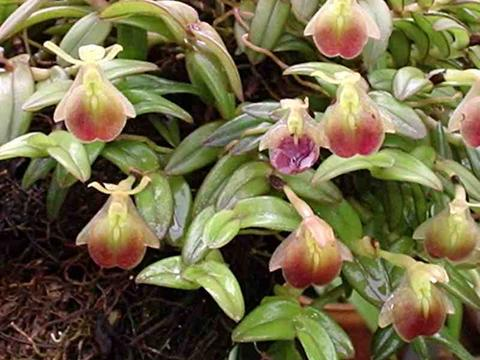
Nanodes (E.) porpax

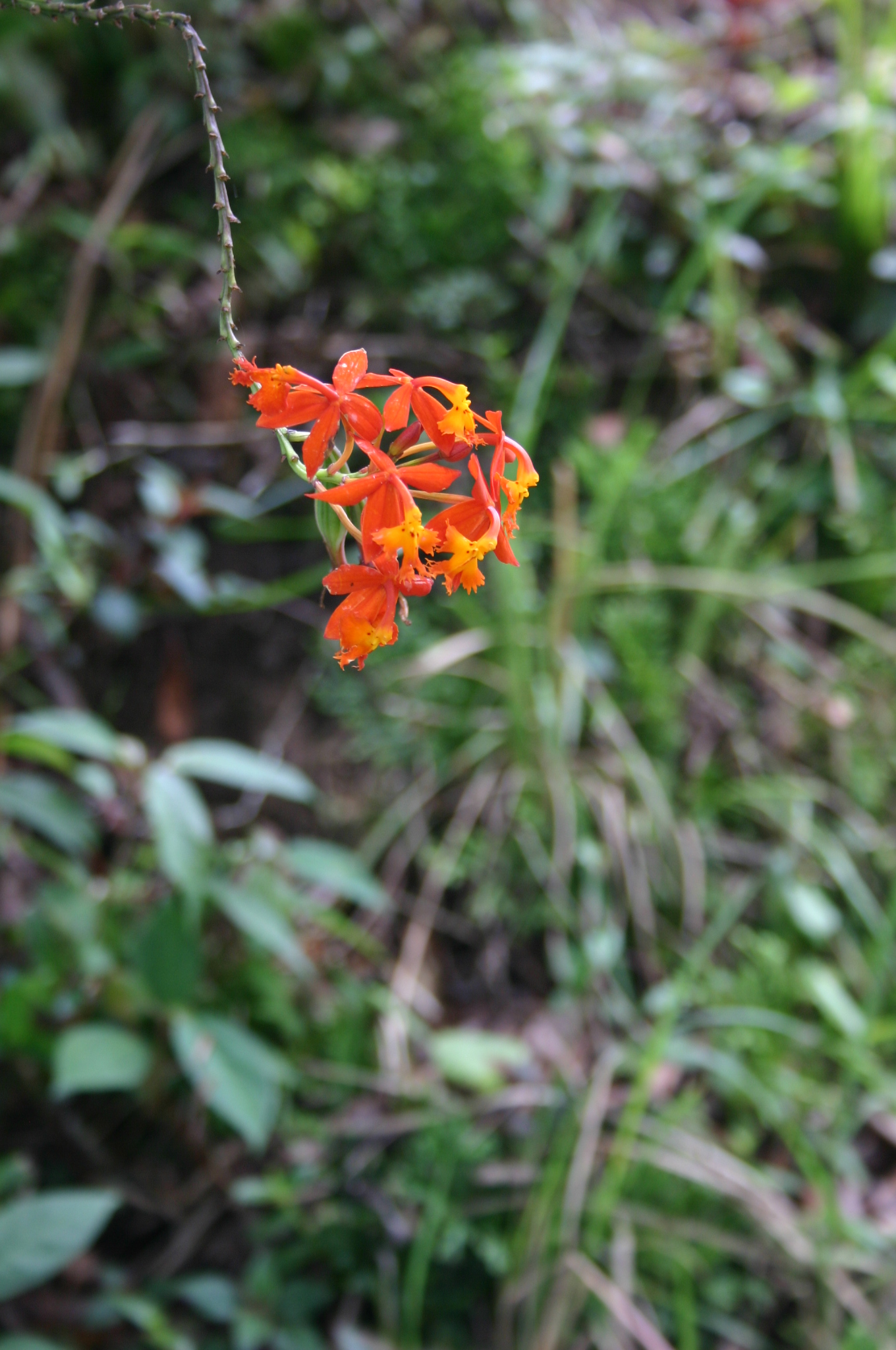
E. radicans in the wild; Tziscao, Chiapas, Mexico.

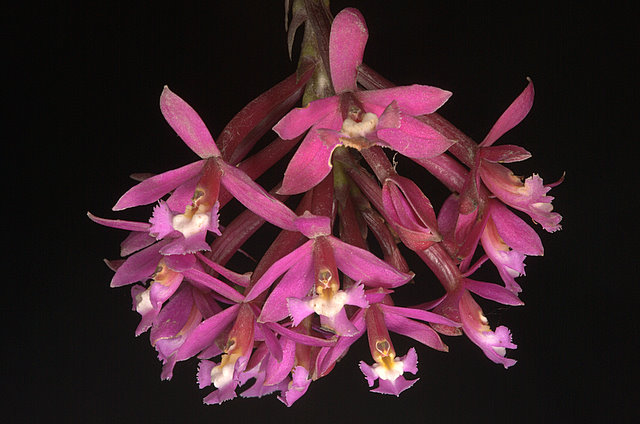
E. secundum in the montane forest of Cusco, southeastern Peru.
