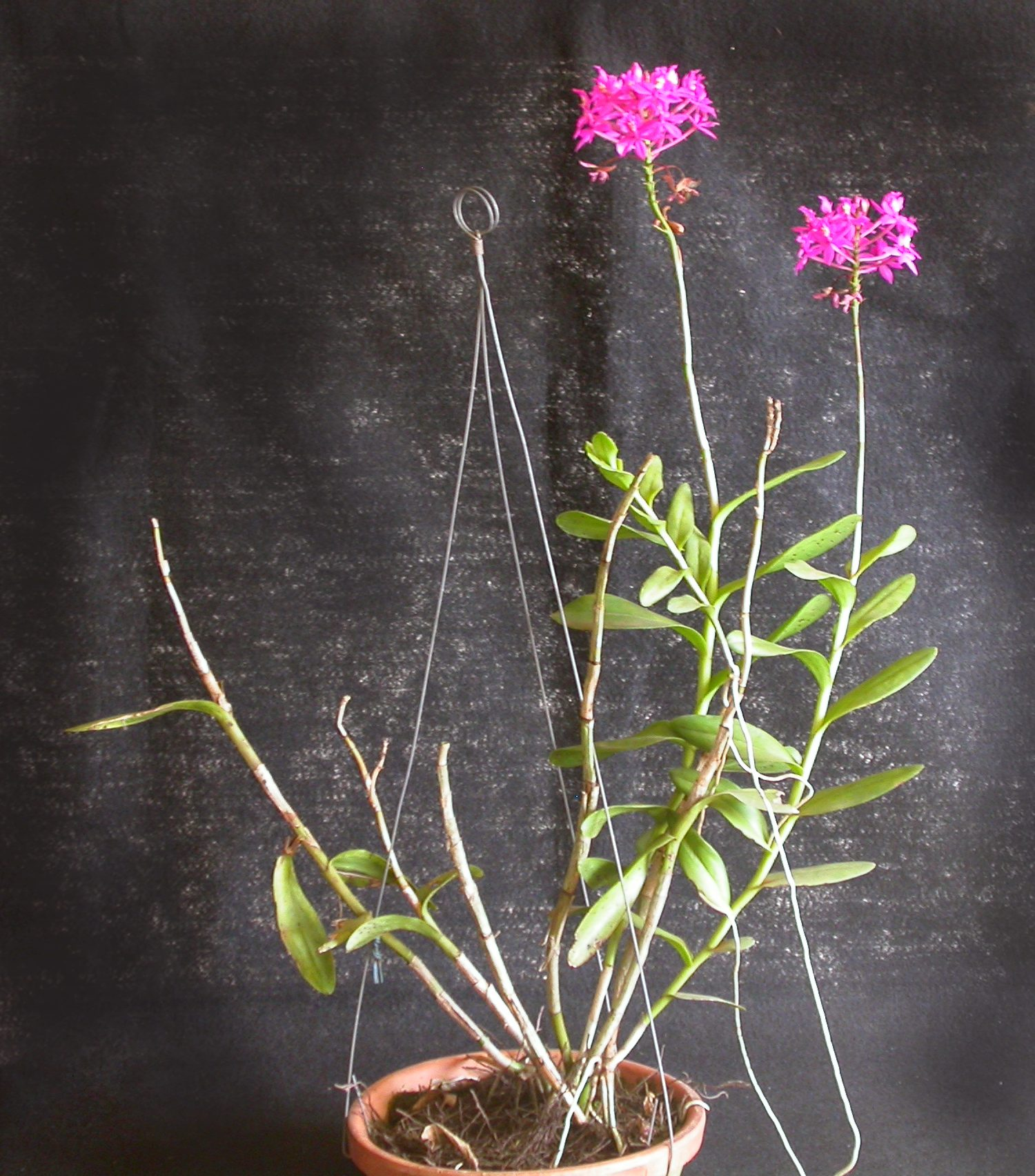
- An Epidendrum denticulatum plant, showing habit of Epidendrum subg. Amphiglottium

Scientific classification
- Kingdom: Plantae
- Clade: Tracheophytes
- Clade: Angiosperms
- Clade: Monocots
- Order: Asparagales
- Family: Orchidaceae
- Subfamily: Epidendroideae
- Genus: Epidendrum
- Subgenus: Epidendrum subg. Amphiglottium (Salisb.) Lindl.

= Epidendrum subg. Amphiglottium =

Subgenus of orchids

Epidendrum subg. Amphiglottium (Salisb.) Lindl. 1841 is a subgenus of reed-stemmed Epidendrums, distinguished by an apical inflorescence with the peduncle covered from its base with close imbricating sheaths and by a lip that is adnate to the column to its apex.

Reichenbach published three sections in this subgenus:

- E. sect. Polycladia with truly paniculate inflorescences
- E. sect. Holochila with racemose inflorescences and an undivided lip
- E. sect. Schistochila with racemose inflorescences and a lobate lip
