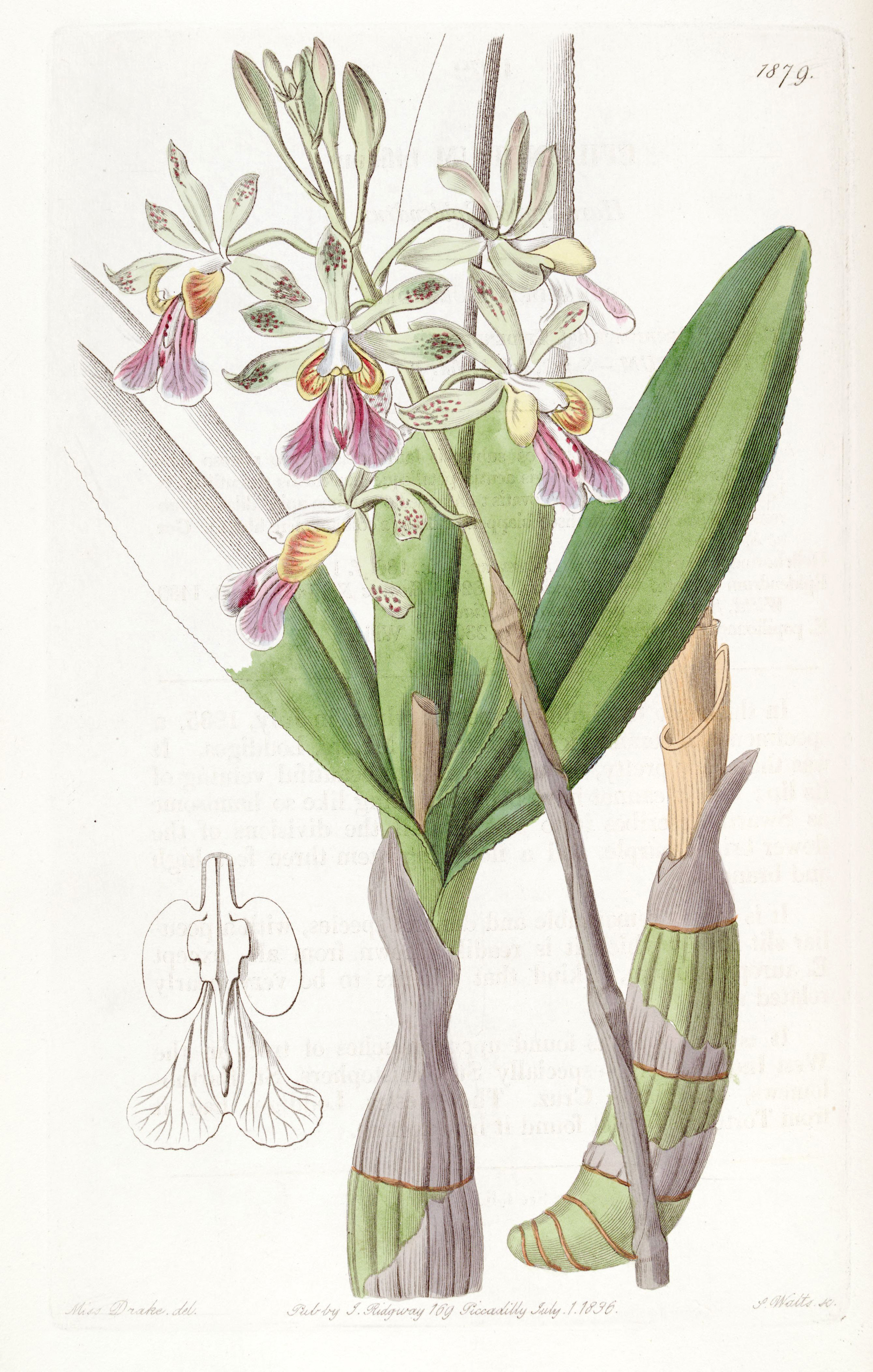
- Psychilis bifida 1836 illustration

Scientific classification
- Kingdom: Plantae
- Clade: Tracheophytes
- Clade: Angiosperms
- Clade: Monocots
- Order: Asparagales
- Family: Orchidaceae
- Subfamily: Epidendroideae
- Tribe: Epidendreae
- Subtribe: Laeliinae
- Genus: Psychilis; Raf.

Type species
- Psychilis bifida

= Psychilis =

Genus of orchids

Psychilis, common name peacock orchid, is a genus of flowering plants from the orchid family, Orchidaceae. It consists of about 15 species native to the West Indies.

== Species ==
Species accepted as of June 2022:

Image	Name	Distribution	Elevation (m)
	Psychilis atropurpurea (Willd. Sauleda (1988)	Hispaniola	0–1,100 metres (0–3,609 ft)
	Psychilis bifida (Aubl. Sauleda (1988)	Hispaniola	
	Psychilis buchii (Cogn. Sauleda (1988)	Hispaniola	350 metres (1,150 ft)
	Psychilis cogniauxii (L.O.Williams) Sauleda (1988)	Hispaniola	0–1,100 metres (0–3,609 ft)
	Psychilis correllii Sauleda (1988)	Leeward Islands	100–200 metres (330–660 ft)
	Psychilis dodii Sauleda (1988)	Dominican Republic	275–1,200 metres (902–3,937 ft)
	Psychilis domingensis (Cogn.) Sauleda (1988)	Dominican Republic	100–1,500 metres (330–4,920 ft)
	Psychilis kraenzlinii (Bello) Sauleda (1988)	Puerto Rico	0–600 metres (0–1,969 ft)
	Psychilis krugii (Bello) Sauleda (1988)	Puerto Rico	0–300 metres (0–984 ft)
	Psychilis macconnelliae Sauleda (1988)	Puerto Rico, Virgin Islands	0–340 metres (0–1,115 ft)
	Psychilis monensis Sauleda (1988)	Mona Island	
	Psychilis olivacea (Cogn.) Sauleda (1988)	Hispaniola	0–250 metres (0–820 ft)
	Psychilis rubeniana Dod ex Sauleda (1988)	Dominican Republic	0–200 metres (0–656 ft)
	Psychilis truncata (Cogn.) Sauleda (1988)	Dominican Republic	0–1,100 metres (0–3,609 ft)
	Psychilis vernicosa (Dod) Sauleda (1988)	Dominican Republic	1,100 metres (3,600 ft)

=== Natural Hybrids ===
Image	Name	Parentage	Distribution	Elevation (m)
	Psychilis × raganii Sauleda	(P. kraenzlinii × P. krugii)	Puerto Rico	
	Psychilis × tudiana (Dod) Sauleda	(P. bifida × P. truncata)	Dominican Republic	

== See also ==
- List of Orchidaceae genera
