= M. portoricensis =

M. portoricensis may refer to:

- Machaonia portoricensis, a flowering plant
- Magnolia portoricensis, a magnolia native to Puerto Rico
- Marasmius portoricensis, a mushroom-forming fungus
- Melanerpes portoricensis, a woodpecker endemic to Puerto Rico
- Mimetus portoricensis, a pirate spider
- Moodnopsis portoricensis, a snout moth
