= × Cattleytonia =

Scientific classification
- Kingdom: Plantae
- Clade: Tracheophytes
- Clade: Angiosperms
- Clade: Monocots
- Order: Asparagales
- Family: Orchidaceae
- Subfamily: Epidendroideae
- Tribe: Epidendreae
- Subtribe: Laeliinae
- Genus: × Cattleytonia hort.

Genus of orchids

The Cattleytonia

× Cattleytonia (from Cattleya and Broughtonia, its parental genera) is an intergeneric hybrid of orchids. It is abbreviated Ctna in horticultural trade.
