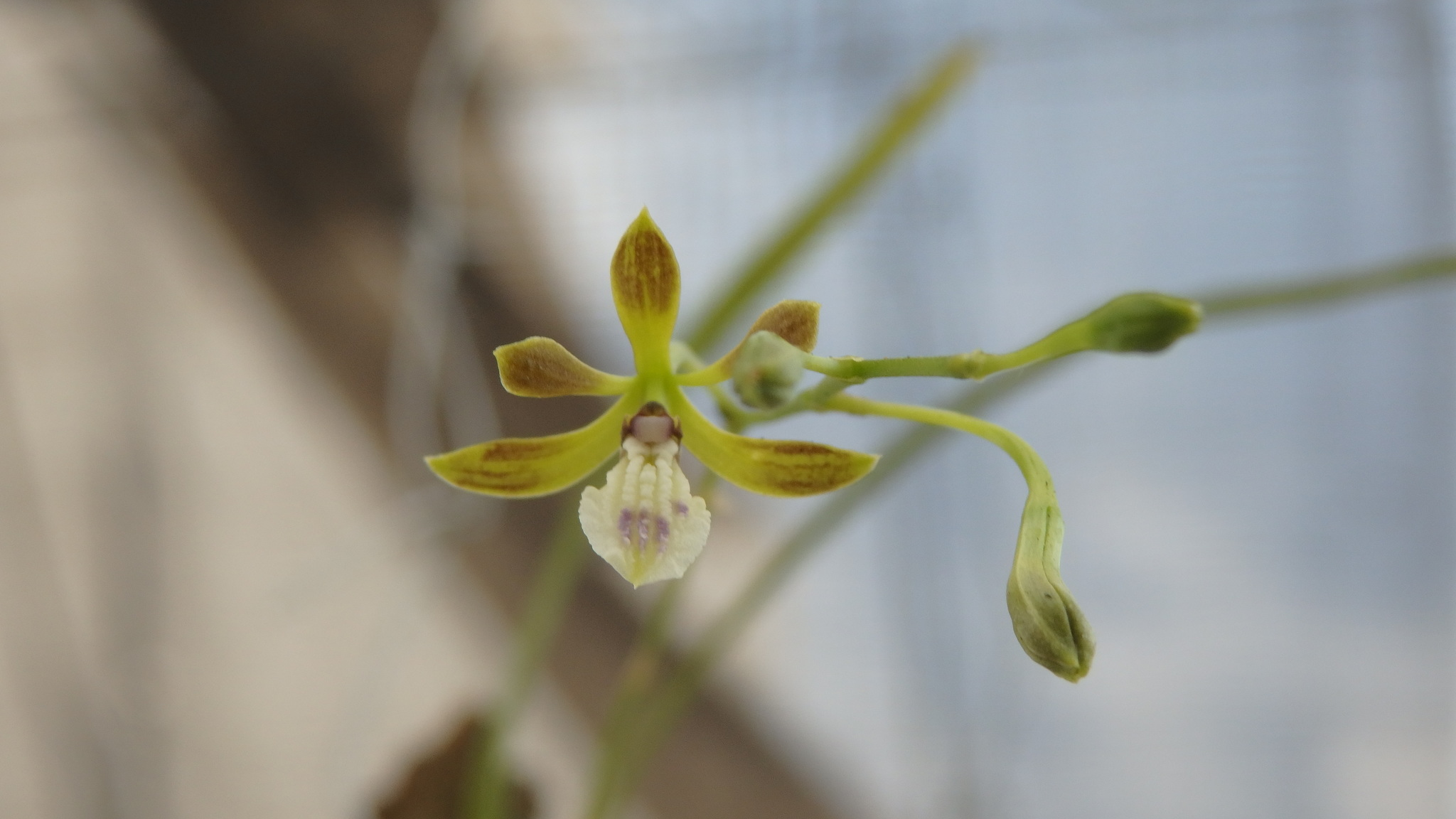
- Oestlundia luteorosea in México

Scientific classification
- Kingdom: Plantae
- Clade: Tracheophytes
- Clade: Angiosperms
- Clade: Monocots
- Order: Asparagales
- Family: Orchidaceae
- Subfamily: Epidendroideae
- Tribe: Epidendreae
- Subtribe: Laeliinae
- Genus: Oestlundia; W.E.Higgins

= Oestlundia =

Genus of orchids

Oestlundia is a genus of orchids within the subtribe Laeliinae. The species in this genus are distributed from Mexico to Venezuela.

== Taxonomic history ==
Encyclia sect. Oestlundia was published in 1971 by Dressler and Pollard, before the genus Encyclia was accepted. In 2001, Higgins removed this taxon from the genus Epidendrum and elevated it to generic rank, removing E. subulatifolium in the process.

== Acceptance ==
On October 28, 2009, the World Checklist (WCSP) stated that this name was accepted, the World Checklist also states that the independence of this genus is accepted in Epidendroideae (Part One). Genera Orchidacearum 4 (2001).

== Species (and synonymy) ==
Plants of the World Online accepts four species.

- Oestlundia cyanocolumna (Ames, F.T.Hubb. & C.Schweinf.) W.E.Higgins (synonyms Encyclia cyanocolumna and Epidendrum cyanocolumna) – Mexico
- Oestlundia distantiflora (A.Rich. & Galeotti) W.E.Higgins (synonyms Encyclia distantiflora and Epidendrum distantiflorum) – southern Mexico, Guatemala, and Belize
- Oestlundia ligulata (La Llave & Lex.) Soto Arenas (synonyms Epidendrum ligulatum, Epidendrum llavei, Encyclia tenuissima, Epidenrum tenuissimum, and Oestlundia tenuissima) – central and southwestern Mexico
- Oestlundia luteorosea (A.Rich. & Galeotti) W.E.Higgins (synonyms Encyclia luteorosea, Epidendrum luteoroseum, Encyclia linearis, Epidendrum lineare Ruiz & Pav. (1798) nom. illeg., and Epidendrum seriatum) – southern Mexico, Central America, Venezuela, Colombia, and Peru
