= Dinema =

Dinema is the genus name of:

- Dinema (plant), a genus of orchids
- Dinema (protist), a genus of euglenids
