= Quisqueya (plant) =

Scientific classification
- Kingdom: Plantae
- Clade: Embryophytes
- Clade: Tracheophytes
- Clade: Spermatophytes
- Clade: Angiosperms
- Clade: Monocots
- Order: Asparagales
- Family: Orchidaceae
- Subfamily: Epidendroideae
- Tribe: Epidendreae
- Subtribe: Laeliinae
- Genus: Quisqueya; Dod

Species
- Quisqueya ekmanii; Quisqueya fuertesii; Quisqueya holdridgei; Quisqueya karstii

Genus of orchids

Quisqueya is a genus of orchids, consisting of four species endemic of Dominican Republic, to the island of Santo Domingo (split between the Dominican Republic and Haiti) of the Greater Antilles. The genus was established in 1979 by Donald Dungan Dod. Its name is derived from the Taíno name for Hispaniola.
