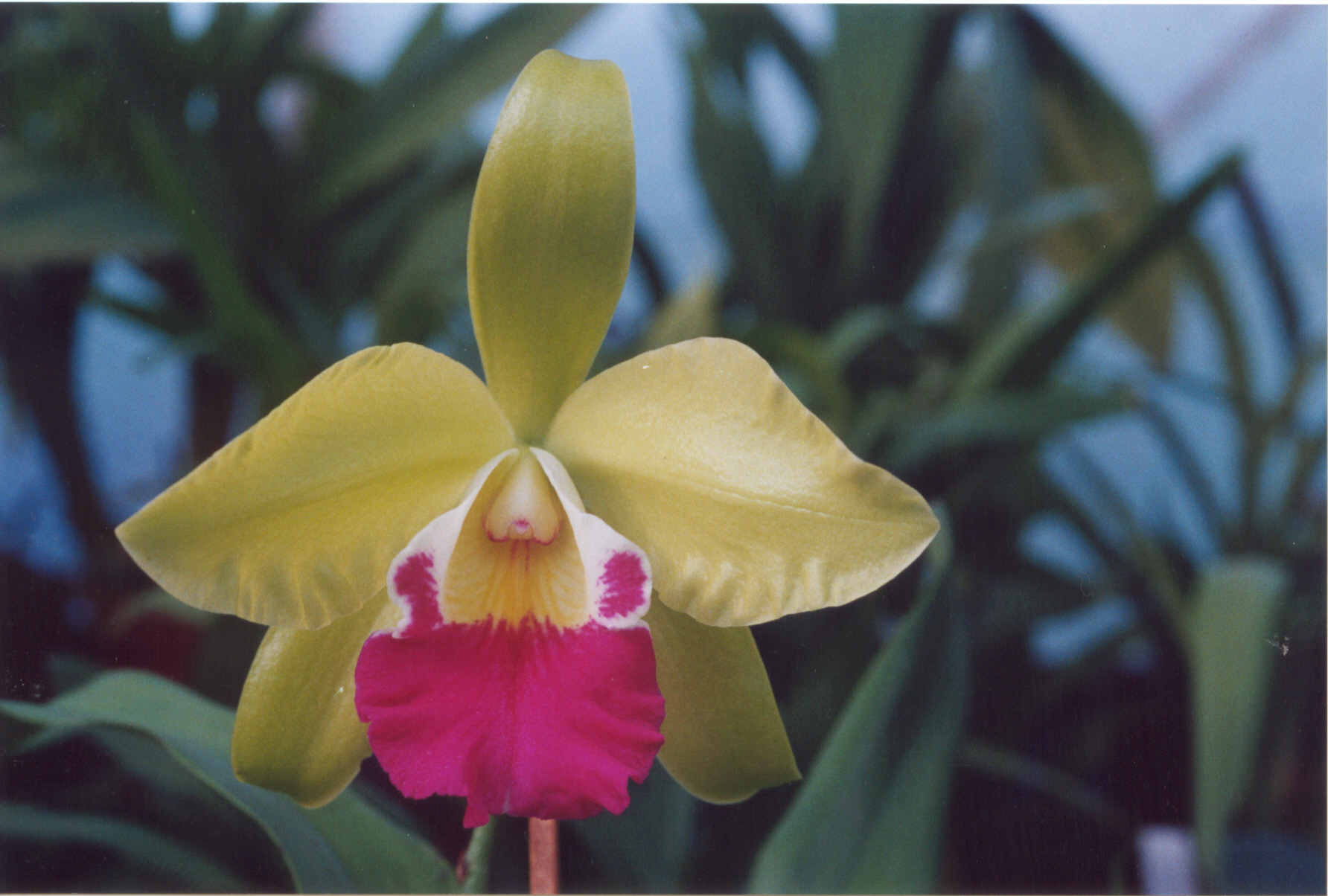
- × Epilaeliocattleya Mae Bly

Scientific classification
- Kingdom: Plantae
- Clade: Tracheophytes
- Clade: Angiosperms
- Clade: Monocots
- Order: Asparagales
- Family: Orchidaceae
- Subfamily: Epidendroideae
- Tribe: Epidendreae
- Subtribe: Laeliinae
- Genus: × Epilaeliocattleya hort.

Species
- Several cultivars

= × Epilaeliocattleya =

Genus of orchids

× Epilaeliocattleya, abbreviated Eplc. in the horticultural trade, is the nothogenus consisting of all intergeneric orchid hybrids descended from at least one species in each of the parent genera (Epidendrum, Laelia and Cattleya), and from no other natural genera.
