= × Brassoepidendrum =

Scientific classification
- Kingdom: Plantae
- Clade: Tracheophytes
- Clade: Angiosperms
- Clade: Monocots
- Order: Asparagales
- Family: Orchidaceae
- Subfamily: Epidendroideae
- Tribe: Epidendreae
- Subtribe: Laeliinae
- Genus: × Brassoepidendrum hort.

Genus of flowering plants

× Brassoepidendrum, abbreviated Bepi. in the horticultural trade, is the nothogenus of intergeneric orchid hybrids including wild ancestors from both genera Brassavola and Epidendrum, and from no others.
