= SMBC =

SMBC may refer to:

== Companies and organizations ==
- Sumitomo Mitsui Banking Corporation, a bank based in Japan
- SMBC Aviation Capital, an aircraft leasing company associated with the bank
- Sydney Missionary and Bible College

== Government and politics ==
- Sefton Metropolitan Borough Council, in Merseyside, England
- Solihull Metropolitan Borough Council, in the West Midlands, England
- Stockport Metropolitan Borough Council, in Greater Manchester, England

== Media and entertainment ==
- Saturday Morning Breakfast Cereal, a webcomic
- Super Mario Bros. Crossover, an online video game

== Other uses ==
- × Schombocattleya, an orchid
- Single mother by choice
- Swiss meringue buttercream
