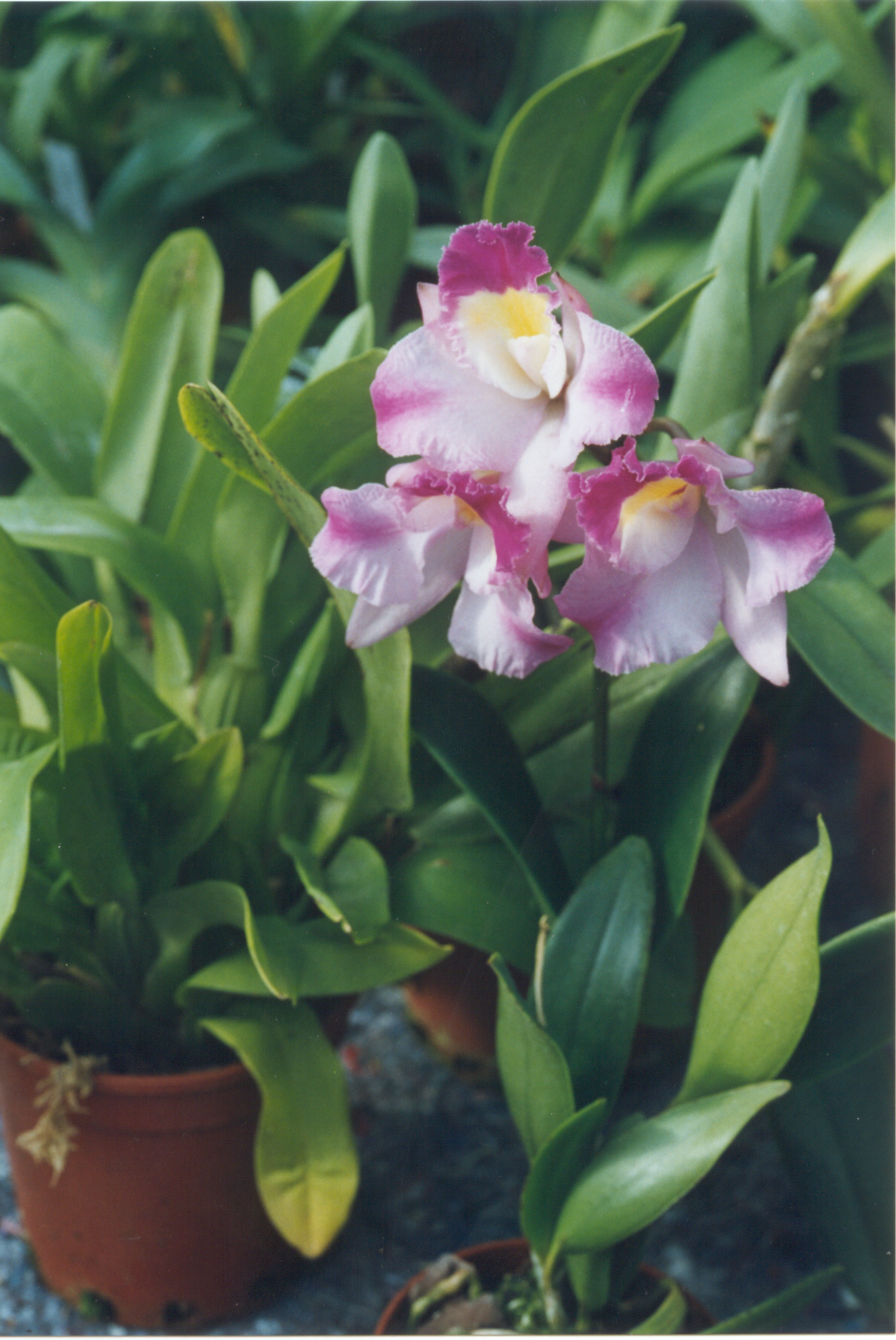
- × Laeliocatonia Peggy Show 'Vegas'

Scientific classification
- Kingdom: Plantae
- Clade: Tracheophytes
- Clade: Angiosperms
- Clade: Monocots
- Order: Asparagales
- Family: Orchidaceae
- Subfamily: Epidendroideae
- Tribe: Epidendreae
- Subtribe: Laeliinae
- Genus: × Laeliocatonia hort.

Species
- Several cultivars

= × Laeliocatonia =

Genus of orchids

× Laeliocatonia is a nothogenus of intergeneric orchid hybrids descended from the parent genera Broughtonia, Cattleya and Laelia. It is abbreviated Lctna. in the horticultural trade.

× Hawkinsara, abbreviated Hknsa. in the horticultural trade, was the name used for hybrids involving Broughtonia, Cattleya, Laelia and Sophronitis. As of May 2026, Sophronitis was considered a synonym of Cattleya, so that plants placed in × Hawkinsara were correctly placed in × Laeliocatonia.

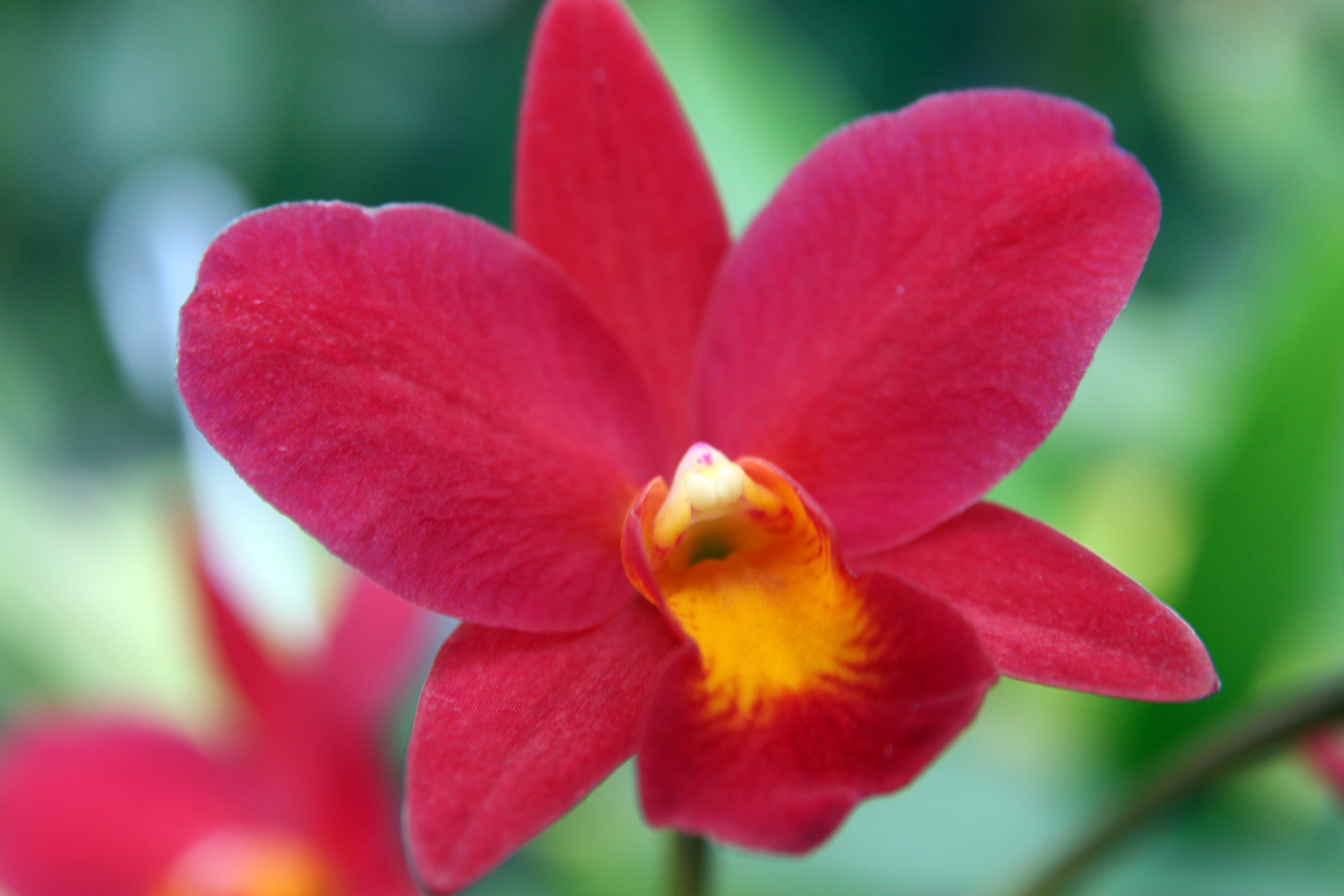
× Laeliocatonia cultivar formerly known as × Hawkinsara Keepsake 'Robert'
