= Epidendrum floridense =

Scientific classification
- Kingdom: Plantae
- Clade: Tracheophytes
- Clade: Angiosperms
- Clade: Monocots
- Order: Asparagales
- Family: Orchidaceae
- Subfamily: Epidendroideae
- Tribe: Epidendreae
- Subtribe: Laeliinae
- Genus: Epidendrum
- Species: E. floridense

Binomial name
- Epidendrum floridense Hágsater

Species of orchid

Epidendrum floridense (Florida star orchid or umbrella star orchid) is a threatened species of orchid native to southern Florida, in the Everglades and in the region around Lake Okeechobee. It was long listed as E. difforme Jacquin, formerly considered a highly variable species but now known to be a complex of dozens of species.

Epidendrum floridense is a cespitose herb, epiphytic on various trees in swamps and forests. It has green, moth-pollinated flowers.
