= Moodnopsis inornatella =

Scientific classification
- Domain: Eukaryota
- Kingdom: Animalia
- Phylum: Arthropoda
- Class: Insecta
- Order: Lepidoptera
- Family: Pyralidae
- Genus: Moodnopsis
- Species: M. inornatella

Binomial name
- Moodnopsis inornatella (Ragonot, 1888)

Synonyms
- Zophodia inornatella Ragonot, 1888

Species of moth

Moodnopsis inornatella is a species of snout moth in the genus Moodnopsis. It is found in Brazil.
