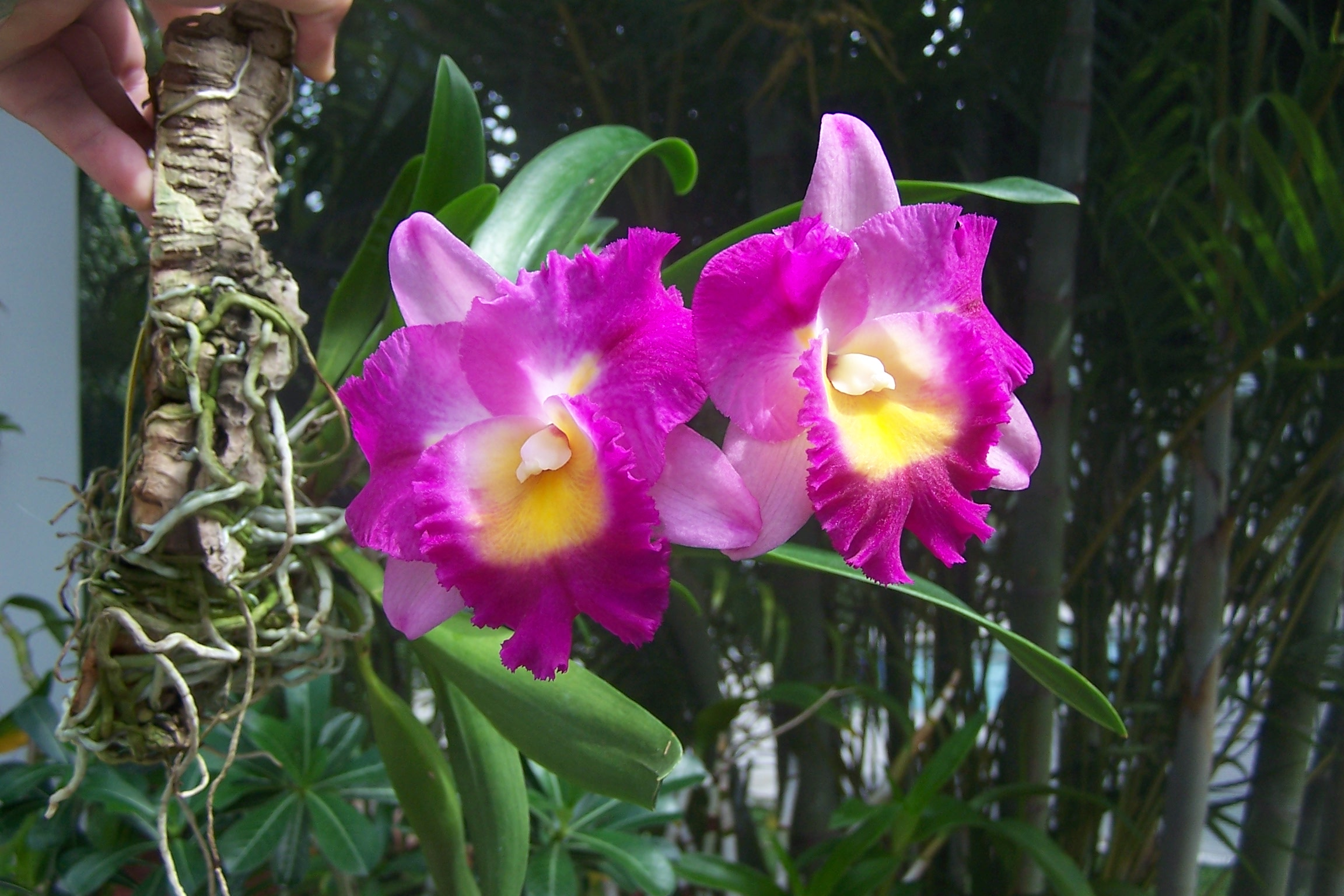
- × Otaara Hwa Yuan Bay

Scientific classification
- Kingdom: Plantae
- Clade: Tracheophytes
- Clade: Angiosperms
- Clade: Monocots
- Order: Asparagales
- Family: Orchidaceae
- Subfamily: Epidendroideae
- Tribe: Epidendreae
- Subtribe: Laeliinae
- Genus: × Otaara hort.

Species
- Several cultivars

= × Otaara =

Genus of orchids

× Otaara, abbreviated Otr. in the horticultural trade, is an intergeneric hybrid of orchids, with Brassavola, Broughtonia, Cattleya and Laelia as parent genera.
