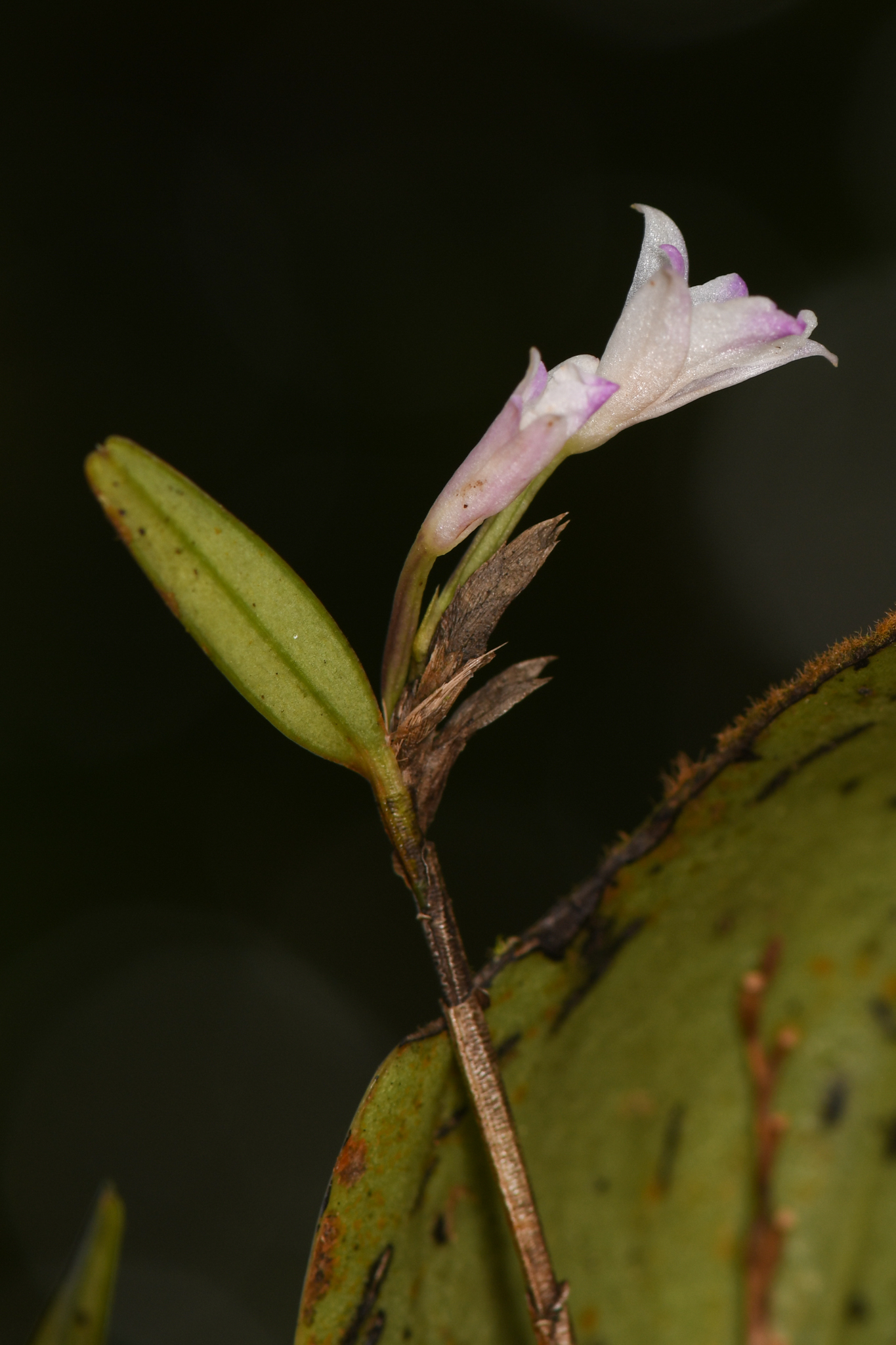

Conservation status
- CITES Appendix II (CITES)

Scientific classification
- Kingdom: Plantae
- Clade: Tracheophytes
- Clade: Angiosperms
- Clade: Monocots
- Order: Asparagales
- Family: Orchidaceae
- Subfamily: Epidendroideae
- Tribe: Epidendreae
- Subtribe: Laeliinae
- Genus: Acrorchis; Dressler
- Species: A. roseola

Binomial name
- Acrorchis roseola Dressler

= Acrorchis =

Genus of epiphytes

Acrorchis is a monotypic genus from the orchid family (Orchidaceae), subfamily Epidendroideae, tribe Epidendreae, subtribe Laeliinae.

The only species, Acrorchis roseola, is an epiphytic orchid that occurs in Costa Rica and Panama at heights between 900 and 2,500 m. It is clump-forming, magenta orchid, reaching a height of 15 cm. The sepals and petals of its small flowers have distinct lengths and shapes. The base of the lip has a white color on the margins.

This orchid is very rare in cultivation.
