= Moodnopsis =

Scientific classification
- Kingdom: Animalia
- Phylum: Arthropoda
- Class: Insecta
- Order: Lepidoptera
- Family: Pyralidae
- Subfamily: Phycitinae
- Genus: Moodnopsis; Dyar, 1914

Synonyms
- Campyloplesis Dyar, 1919

Genus of moths

Moodnopsis is a genus of snout moths, described by Harrison Gray Dyar Jr. in 1914.

== Species ==
- Moodnopsis decipiens Dyar, 1914
- Moodnopsis inornatella
- Moodnopsis inveterella (Dyar, 1919)
- Moodnopsis parallela
- Moodnopsis perangusta
- Moodnopsis portoricensis
