= Moodnopsis decipiens =

Scientific classification
- Kingdom: Animalia
- Phylum: Arthropoda
- Class: Insecta
- Order: Lepidoptera
- Family: Pyralidae
- Genus: Moodnopsis
- Species: M. decipiens

Binomial name
- Moodnopsis decipiens Dyar, 1914

Species of moth

Moodnopsis decipiens is a species of snout moth, and the type species in the genus Moodnopsis. It was described by Harrison Gray Dyar Jr. in 1914. It is found in Mexico.
