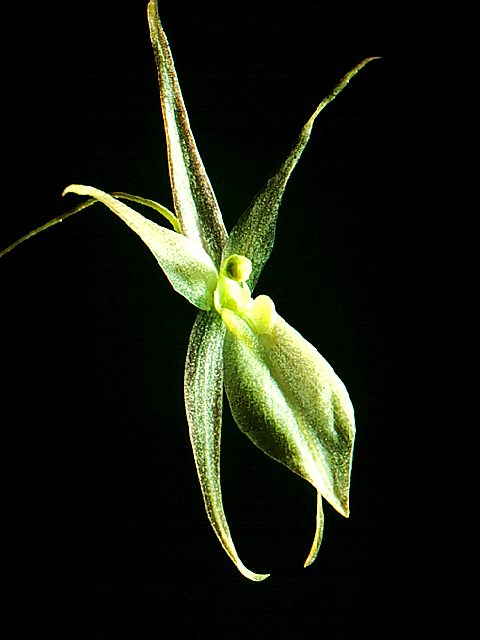
- Homatopetalum pumilio

Scientific classification
- Kingdom: Plantae
- Clade: Tracheophytes
- Clade: Angiosperms
- Clade: Monocots
- Order: Asparagales
- Family: Orchidaceae
- Subfamily: Epidendroideae
- Tribe: Epidendreae
- Subtribe: Laeliinae
- Genus: Homalopetalum; Rolfe

Synonyms
- Pinelia Lindl. 1853, not Pinellia 1839; Pinelianthe Rauschert 1983

= Homalopetalum =

Genus of orchids

Homalopetalum is a genus of flowering plants from the orchid family, Orchidaceae. It contains 8 known species native to Central America, northern South America, Mexico and the West Indies.

1. Homalopetalum alticola (Garay & Dunst.) Soto Arenas - Venezuela
2. Homalopetalum hypoleptum (Lindl.) Soto Arenas - Brazil
3. Homalopetalum kienastii (Rchb.f.) Withner - Mexico
4. Homalopetalum leochilus (Rchb.f.) Soto Arenas - Cuba, Dominican Republic
5. Homalopetalum pachyphyllum (L.O.Williams) Dressler - Mexico
6. Homalopetalum pumilio (Rchb.f.) Schltr. - Mexico, Central America, Ecuador
7. Homalopetalum pumilum (Ames) Dressler - Mexico
8. Homalopetalum vomeriforme (Sw.) Fawc. & Rendle - Cuba, Jamaica

== See also ==
- List of Orchidaceae genera
