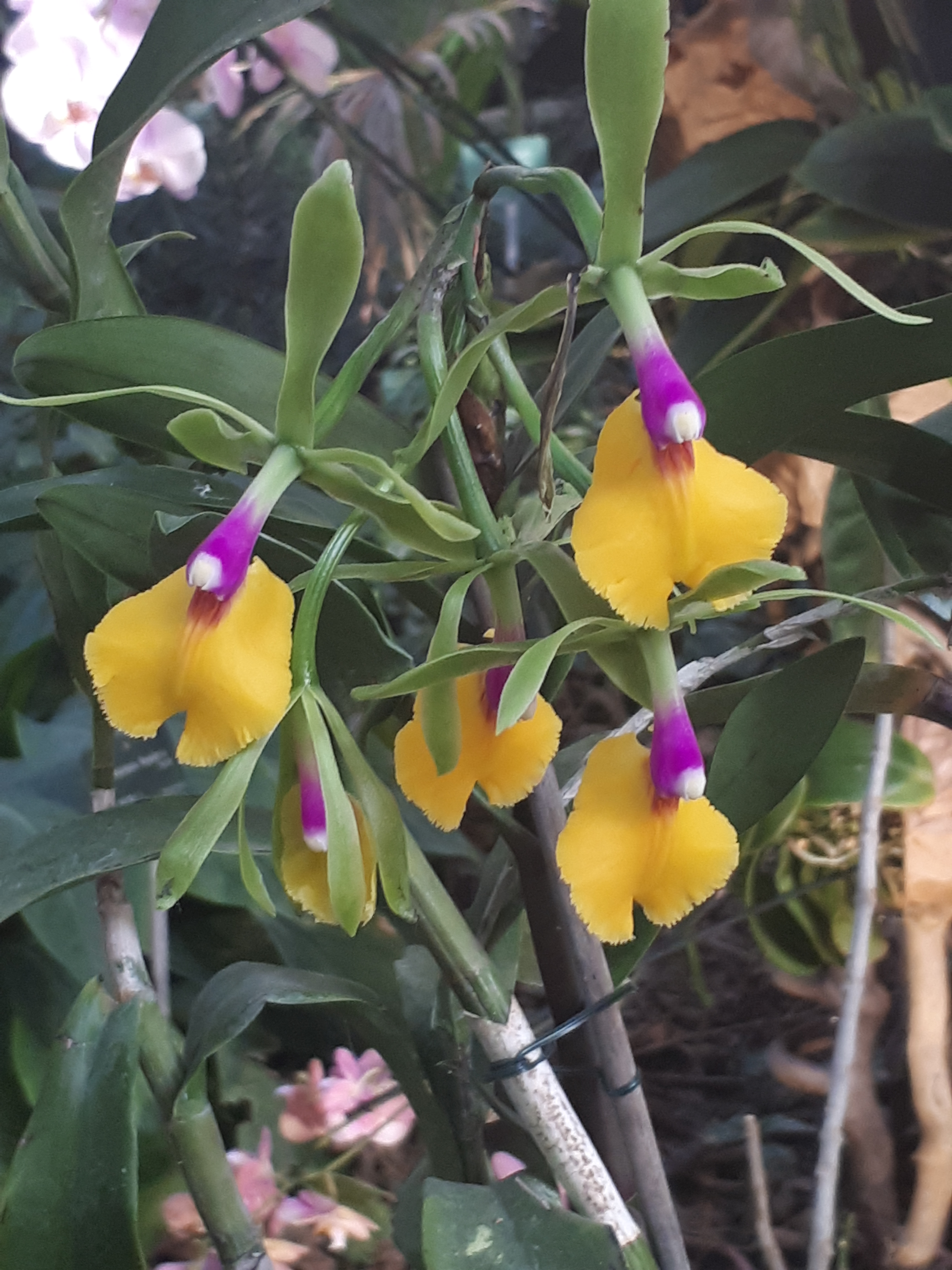
- Epicattleya René Marqués

Scientific classification
- Kingdom: Plantae
- Clade: Tracheophytes
- Clade: Angiosperms
- Clade: Monocots
- Order: Asparagales
- Family: Orchidaceae
- Subfamily: Epidendroideae
- Tribe: Epidendreae
- Subtribe: Laeliinae
- Genus: × Epicattleya; Rolfe

Species
- Several cultivars

= × Epicattleya =

Genus of orchids

× Epicattleya (from Cattleya and Epidendrum, its parent genera) is an intergeneric orchid hybrid. The nothogenus is abbreviated Epc. in the horticultural trade.
