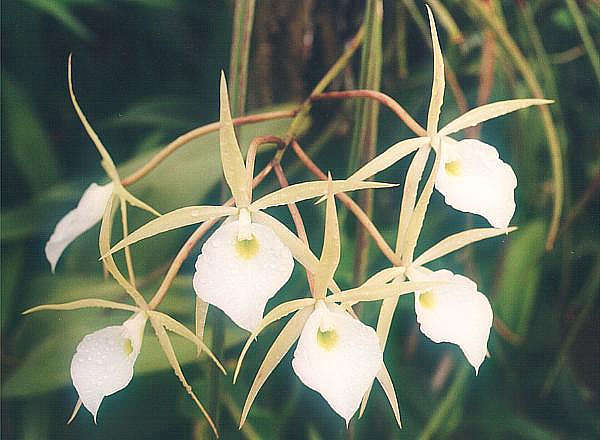
- Brassavola flagellaris, a species within the Laeliinae subtribe

Scientific classification
- Kingdom: Plantae
- Clade: Tracheophytes
- Clade: Angiosperms
- Clade: Monocots
- Order: Asparagales
- Family: Orchidaceae
- Subfamily: Epidendroideae
- Tribe: Epidendreae
- Subtribe: Laeliinae; Benth.

Genera
- See text

= Laeliinae =

Subtribe of orchids

Laeliinae is a Neotropical subtribe including 40 orchid genera, such as Brassavola, Laelia and Cattleya. The genus Epidendrum is the largest within this subtribe, containing about 1500 species. This is followed by the genus Encyclia, with over 120 species.

== List of genera ==
Genera and number of species:

- Acrorchis Dressler, 1
- Adamantinia Van den Berg & M.W.Chase, 1
- Alamania La Llave & Lex., 1
- Arpophyllum La Llave & Lex, 5
- Artorima Dressler & G.E.Pollard, 1
- Barkeria Knowles & Westc., 17
  - Syn. Dothilophis Raf.
- Brassavola R.Br., 17
- Broughtonia R.Br., 6
  - Syn. Cattleyopsis Lem., Laeliopsis Lindl.
- Cattleya Lindl., 118
  - Syn. Maelenia Dum., Sophronitis Lindl., Sophronia Lindl., Lophoglottis Raf., Hoffmannseggella H.G.Jones, Hadrolaelia (Schltr.) Chiron & V.P.Castro, Dungsia Chiron & V.P.Castro, Microlaelia (Schltr.) Chiron & V.P.Castro, Chironiella Braem, Brasilaelia Campacci, Cattleyella Van den Berg & M.W.Chase, Schluckebieria Braem
- Caularthron Raf., 3
  - Syn. Diacrium (Lindl.)Benth., Dothilophis Raf.
- Constantia Barb.Rodr., 5
- Dimerandra Schltr., 1
- Dinema Lindl., 1
- Domingoa Schltr., 5
  - Syn. Hartwegia Lindl., Nageliella L.O.Williams
- Encyclia Hook., 120
- Epidendrum L., 1500
  - Syn. Amblostoma Scheidw., Amblystoma Kuntze, Amphiglottis Salisb., Amphiglottium (Salisb.) Lindl. ex Stein, Auliza Salisb., Auliza Salisb. ex Small, Aulizeum Lindl. ex Stein, Coilostylis Raf., Didothion Raf., Diothonea Lindl., Epidanthus L.O.Williams, Epidendropsis Garay & Dunst., Gastropodium Lindl., Hemiscleria Lindl., Kalopternix Garay & Dunst., Lanium (Lindl.) Benth., Larnandra Raf., Minicolumna Brieger, Nanodes Lindl., Neohlemannia Kraenzl., Neowilliamsia Garay, Nyctosma Raf., Oerstedella Rchb.f., Physinga Lindl., Pleuranthium (Rchb.f.) Benth., Pseudepidendrum Rchb.f., Psilanthemum Klotszch ex Stein, Seraphyta Fisch. & C.A.Mey., Spathiger Small, Spathium Lindl. ex Stein, Stenoglossum Kunth, Tritelandra Raf.
- Guarianthe Dressler & W.E.Higgins, 4
- Hagsatera R.González, 2
- Homalopetalum Rolfe, 7
  - Syn. Pinelia Lindl., Pinelianthe Rauschert
- Isabelia Barb.Rodr., 3
  - Syn. Neolauchea Kraenzl., Sophronitella Schltr.
- Jacquiniella Schltr., 11
  - Syn. Dressleriella Brieger, Briegeria Senghas
- Laelia Lindl., 25
  - Syn. Amalia Lindl., Amalias Hofmsgg., Schomburgkia Lindl.
- Leptotes Lindl., 5
- Loefgrenianthus Hoehne, 1
- Meiracyllium Rchb.f., 2
- Microepidendrum Brieger ex W.E.Higgins, 1
- Myrmecophila Rolfe, 10
- Nidema Britton & Millsp., 2
- Oestlundia W.E.Higgins, 4
- Orleanesia Barb.Rodr., 11
- Prosthechea Knowles & Westc., 100
  - Syn. Epithecium Knowles & Westc., Hormidium Heynh., Anacheilium Hoffmgg., Euchile (Dressler & G.E.Pollard) Withner, Pseudencyclia Chiron & V.P.Castro., Panarica Withner & P.A.Harding, Pollardia Withner & P.A.Harding
- Pseudolaelia Porto & Brade, 10
  - Syn. Renata Ruschi
- Psychilis Raf., 15
- Pygmaeorchis Brade, 2
- Quisqueya Dod, 4
- Rhyncholaelia Schltr, 2
- Scaphyglottis Poepp. & Endl., 60
  - Syn. Hexisea Lindl., Cladobium Lindl., Hexadesmia Brongn., Tetragamestus Rchb.f., Reichenbachanthus Barb.Rodr., Fractiungis Schltr., Leaoa Schltr. & Porto, Pachystele Schltr., Costaricaea Schltr., Ramonia Schltr., Platyglottis L.O.Williams
- Tetramicra Lindl., 13

=== Nothogenera ===
- × Brassocattleya
- × Brassoepidendrum
- × Brassolaeliocattleya
- × Cattleytonia
- × Cattlianthe
- × Epicattleya
- × Epilaeliocattleya
- × Hawkinsara
- × Laeliocatarthron
- × Laeliocatonia
- × Laeliocattleya
- × Otaara
- × Potinara
- × Rhyncholaeliocattleya
- × Schombocattleya
- × Sophrocattleya
- × Sophrolaelia
- × Sophrolaeliocattleya
