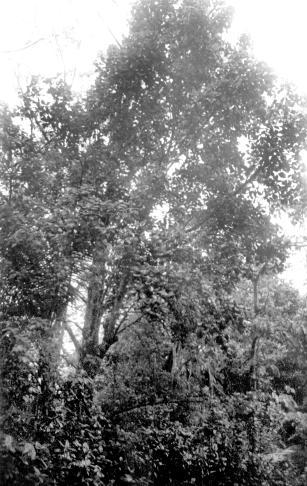
- Jagüilla tree (Magnolia portoricensis) next to a trail at Bosque Estatal de Carite, in Puerto Rico.

Conservation status
- Endangered (IUCN 3.1)

Scientific classification
- Kingdom: Plantae
- Clade: Embryophytes
- Clade: Tracheophytes
- Clade: Spermatophytes
- Clade: Angiosperms
- Clade: Magnoliids
- Order: Magnoliales
- Family: Magnoliaceae
- Genus: Magnolia
- Section: Magnolia sect. Talauma
- Subsection: Magnolia subsect. Cubenses
- Species: M. portoricensis

Binomial name
- Magnolia portoricensis Bello

Synonyms
- Dugandiodendron portoricense (Bello) Sima & S.G.Lu; Magnolia patoricensis P.Parm.

= Magnolia portoricensis =

Species of plant

Magnolia portoricensis is a tree of the Caribbean region. Its vernacular names include jagüilla and Puerto Rico magnolia. It is native to Puerto Rico and it is found in the Toro Negro State Forest. It is an endangered tree and endemic to Puerto Rico. It is a dicot and a part of the family Magnoliaceae. It is an uncommon tree, found primarily in the central and western mountains at 500 to 925 m above sea level.

== Habitat and ecology ==
Magnolia portoricensis is a fairly large evergreen tree that can grow as tall as 25 m. In Puerto Rico it can be found specifically in state forests of the central region such as Carite, Toro Negro, Guilarte West and Maricao, and in higher elevation areas like Ciales, Jayuya and Adjuntas. This tree grows in cloud forests with about 2000 to 4000 mm of rainfall per year. It is found mostly on the peaks and slopes of mountains, thriving best in volcanic areas. These soils are derived from igneous rocks (including serpentine), have high clay content, and are moderately well drained, with pH between 5 and 7.5. Abundant moisture in the soil is typical and may be essential for the development of the jaguilla.

== Key features ==
Leaves are large, oval shaped, and waxy, and are alternate on the stem. Leaves and stems are free of hairs, distinguishing it from the closely related Magnolia splendens that grows in the eastern mountains. The Jaguilla produces white flowers that are large, fragrant and showy. The flowers are hermaphroditic. The numerous carpels each have a curved style that peaks in the center; each carpel is pale yellow and about 6 mm to 12 mm long. There are numerous stamens surrounding the carpels; they are each about 13 mm long.

After pollination (perhaps by beetles as in other Magnolia species) the fruit that it produces is conical in shape and greenish, measuring about 3.5 cm long and 2.5 cm wide. The fruits crack open when ripe, revealing triangular seeds with fleshy orange arils that aid in their dispersal by birds. Rodents are seed predators. Inside the seeds, there is an oil in the endosperm that surrounds the embryo that is found in about 50% of all magnolias. Seedlings are shade tolerant and the tree is slow growing. Association of the roots with arbuscular mycorrhizal fungi is essential for growth.

== Plant uses ==
The jaguilla has high wood quality so it is used for furniture and lumber. Previously it had been used to shade high-altitude coffee plantations that have since been abandoned. The oil of the Magnolia is an ingredient in soap, lotions and perfumes

== Conservation ==
The species population is currently endangered because of deforestation, and the population continues to decline. Puerto Rico currently has no conservation efforts for the tree.
