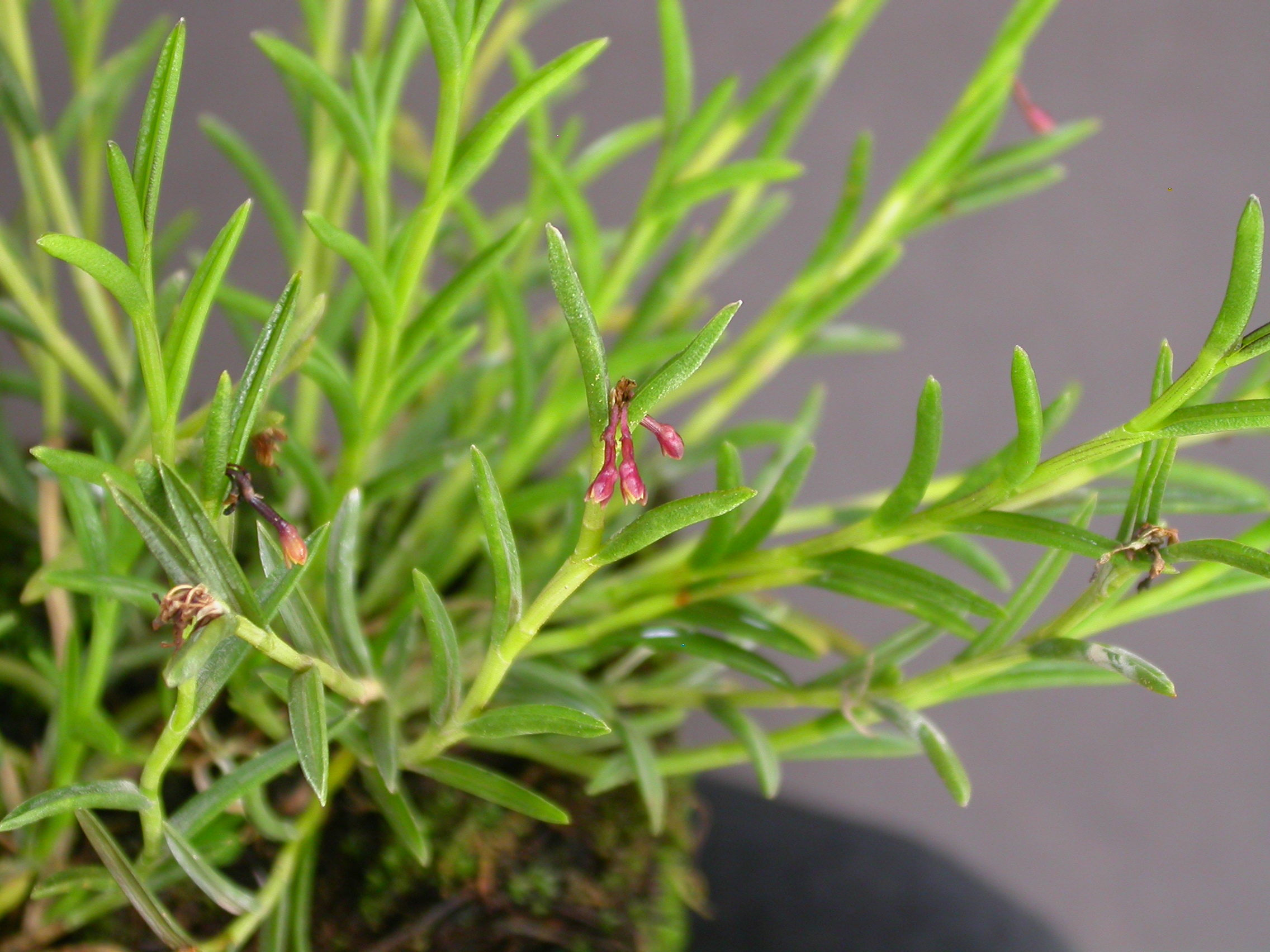
- Jacquiniella globosa

Scientific classification
- Kingdom: Plantae
- Clade: Embryophytes
- Clade: Tracheophytes
- Clade: Spermatophytes
- Clade: Angiosperms
- Clade: Monocots
- Order: Asparagales
- Family: Orchidaceae
- Subfamily: Epidendroideae
- Tribe: Epidendreae
- Subtribe: Laeliinae
- Genus: Jacquiniella; Schltr.

Type species
- Epidendrum globosa Jacq.

Synonyms
- Dressleriella Brieger in F.R.R.Schlechter; Briegeria Senghas

= Jacquiniella =

Genus of orchids

Jacquiniella (tufted orchid) is a genus of flowering plants from the orchid family, Orchidaceae. It is native to Mexico, Central America, the West Indies, and South America.

The diploid chromosome number of one species, J. globosa, has been determined as 2n = 38.

== Species ==
Kew accepts (as of May 2014) twelve species of Jacquiniella:

- Jacquiniella aporophylla (L.O.Williams) Dressler
- Jacquiniella cernua (Lindl.) Dressler
- Jacquiniella cobanensis (Ames & Schltr.)
- Jacquiniella colombiana Schltr.
- Jacquiniella equitantifolia (Ames) Dressler
- Jacquiniella gigantea Dressler
- Jacquiniella globosa (Jacq.) Schltr.
- Jacquiniella leucomelana (Rchb.f.) Schltr.
- Jacquiniella pedunculata Dressler
- Jacquiniella standleyi (Ames) Dressler
- Jacquiniella steyermarkii Carnevali & Dressler
- Jacquiniella teretifolia (Sw.) Britton & P. Wilson

== See also ==
- List of Orchidaceae genera
