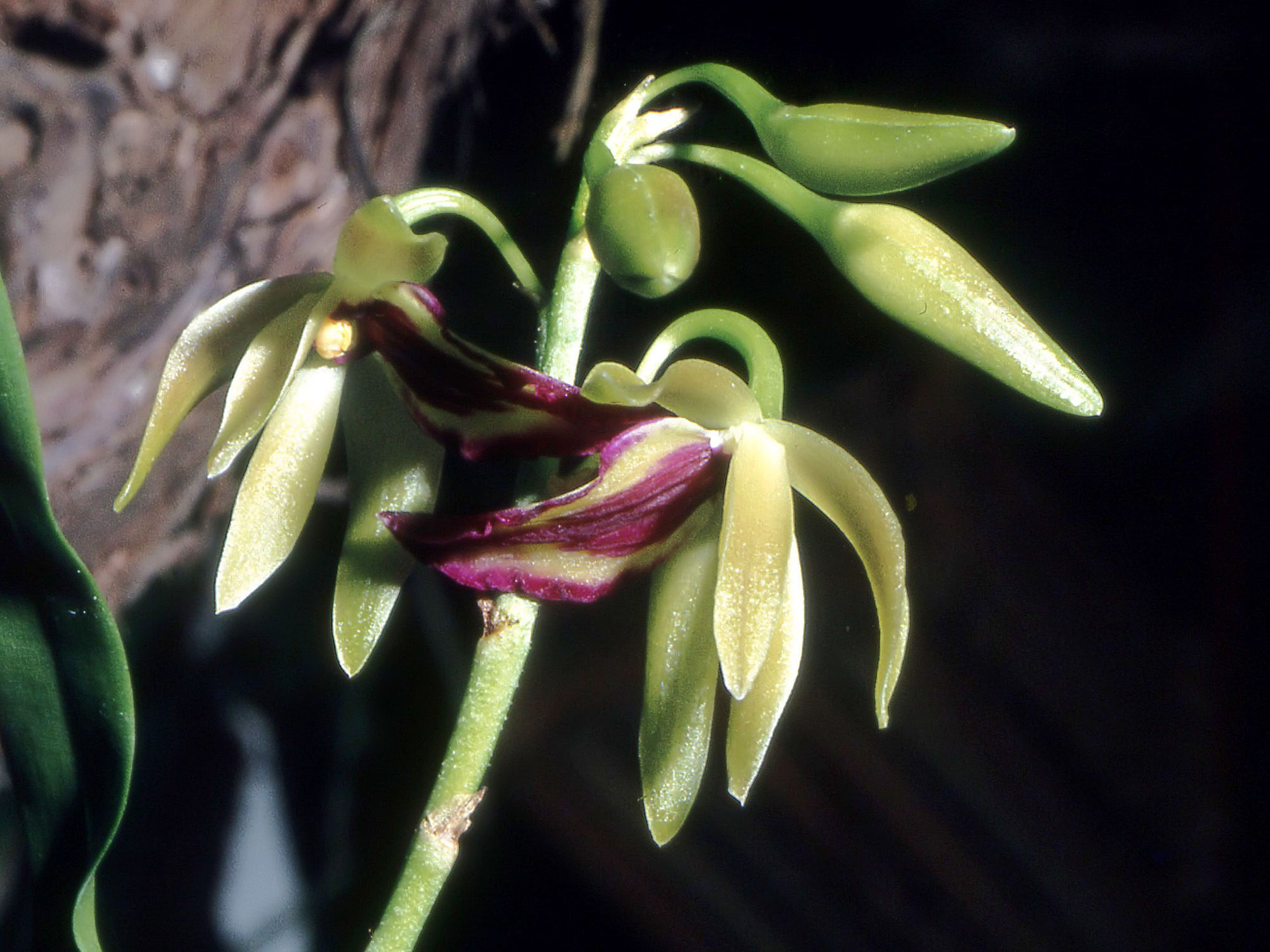
- Hagsatera brachycolumna

Scientific classification
- Kingdom: Plantae
- Clade: Tracheophytes
- Clade: Angiosperms
- Clade: Monocots
- Order: Asparagales
- Family: Orchidaceae
- Subfamily: Epidendroideae
- Tribe: Epidendreae
- Subtribe: Laeliinae
- Genus: Hagsatera; R.González (1974)

= Hagsatera =

Genus of orchids

Hagsatera is a genus of flowering plants from the orchid family, Orchidaceae.

== Description ==
The genus Hagsatera is made up of two species of orchids, one of them was classified in the genus Encyclia, the other was described and used as a type specimen of the genus, the flowers are definitely different, having a free and short column, 8 pollinia which are attached to an elastic caudicle and the seed pod which is triangular in the middle section.

Young plants have a very different appearance from mature plants.

== Species ==
There are two known species, native to Mexico and Guatemala:

Image	Name	Distribution	Elevation (m)
	Hagsatera brachycolumna (L.O.Williams) R.González 1974	Mexico (Guerrero, Oaxaca and Mexico )	1,400–1,950 metres (4,590–6,400 ft)
	Hagsatera rosilloi R.González 1974	Mexico (Jalisco) to Guatemala	

== See also ==
- List of Orchidaceae genera
