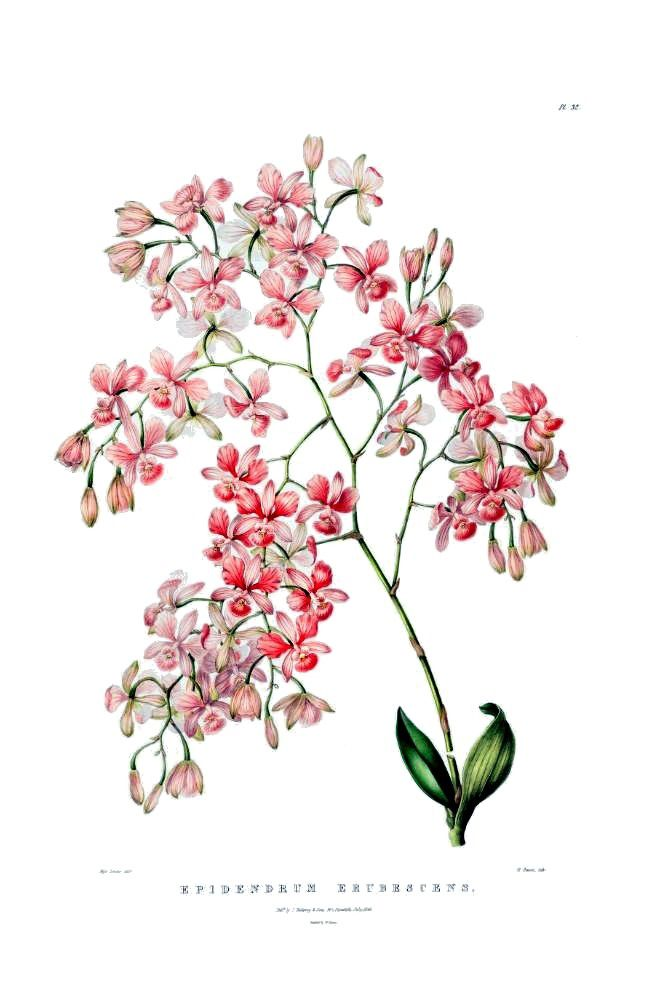
- 1843 illustration from Bateman: "Orchidaceae of Mexico and Guatemala"

Scientific classification
- Kingdom: Plantae
- Clade: Tracheophytes
- Clade: Angiosperms
- Clade: Monocots
- Order: Asparagales
- Family: Orchidaceae
- Subfamily: Epidendroideae
- Tribe: Epidendreae
- Subtribe: Laeliinae
- Genus: Artorima; Dressler & G.E. Pollard
- Species: A. erubescens

Binomial name
- Artorima erubescens Dressler & G.E. Pollard

Synonyms
- Epidendrum erubescens Lindl. (1841).; Encyclia erubescens (Lindl.) Schltr. (1914).

= Artorima =

Genus of orchids

Artorima is a genus of flowering plants from the orchid family, Orchidaceae. At present (May 2014), only one species is known: Artorima erubescens

== Description ==
It is an epiphytic orchid with a thick rhizome and a broad conical-ovoid pseudobulb bearing 3-6 elliptic to oblong-lanceolate leaves 20-120 cm long, with a loose terminal panicle, few to many [6-100], fragrant flowers that bloom winter through early spring.

== Distribution ==
It is found in the ever-cloud forests of Guerrero and Oaxaca in southern Mexico on the highest peaks at elevations from 2,400 to 3,100 meters in a cool place to growing cold.

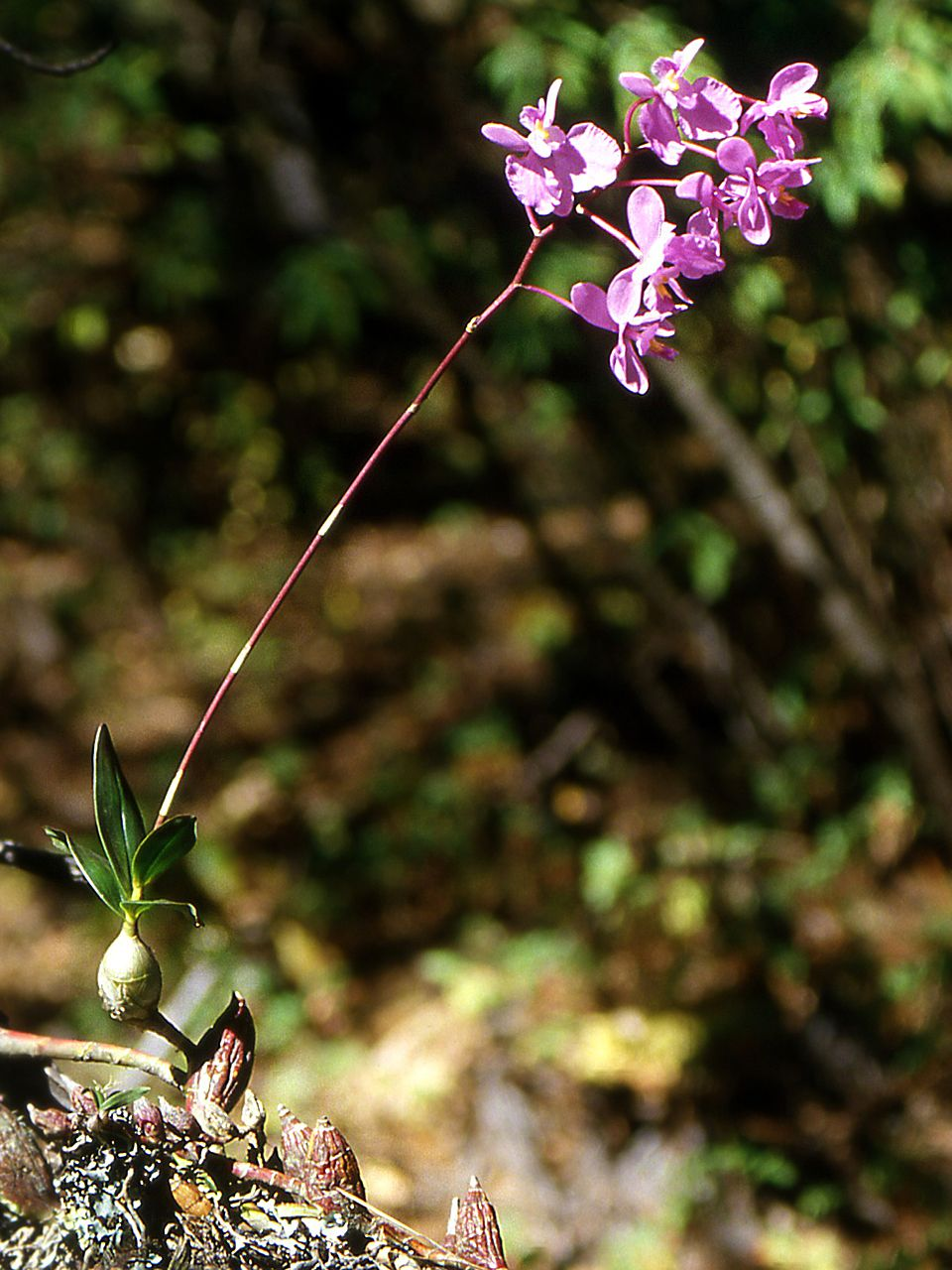
Artorima erubescens

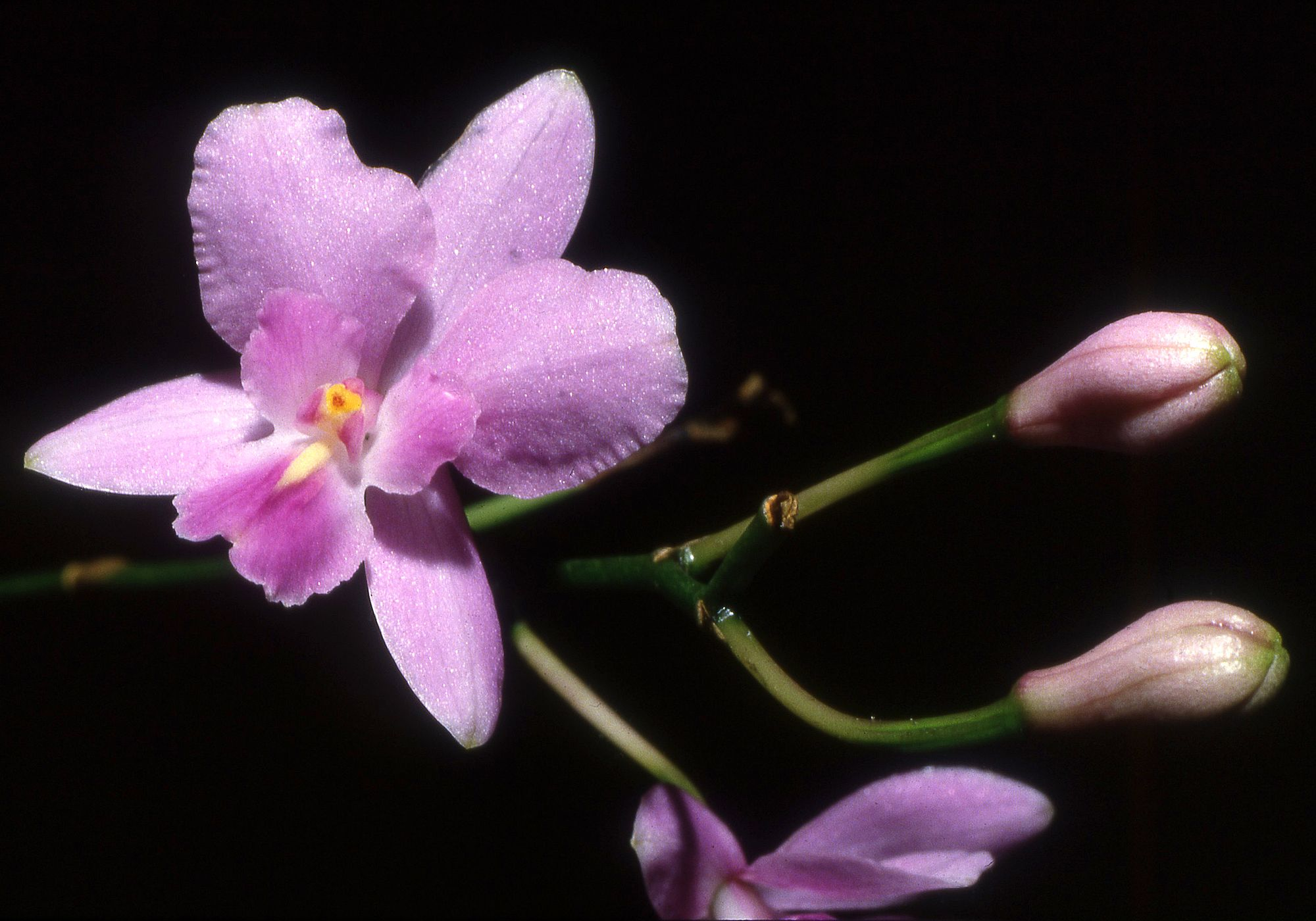

== See also ==
- List of Orchidaceae genera
