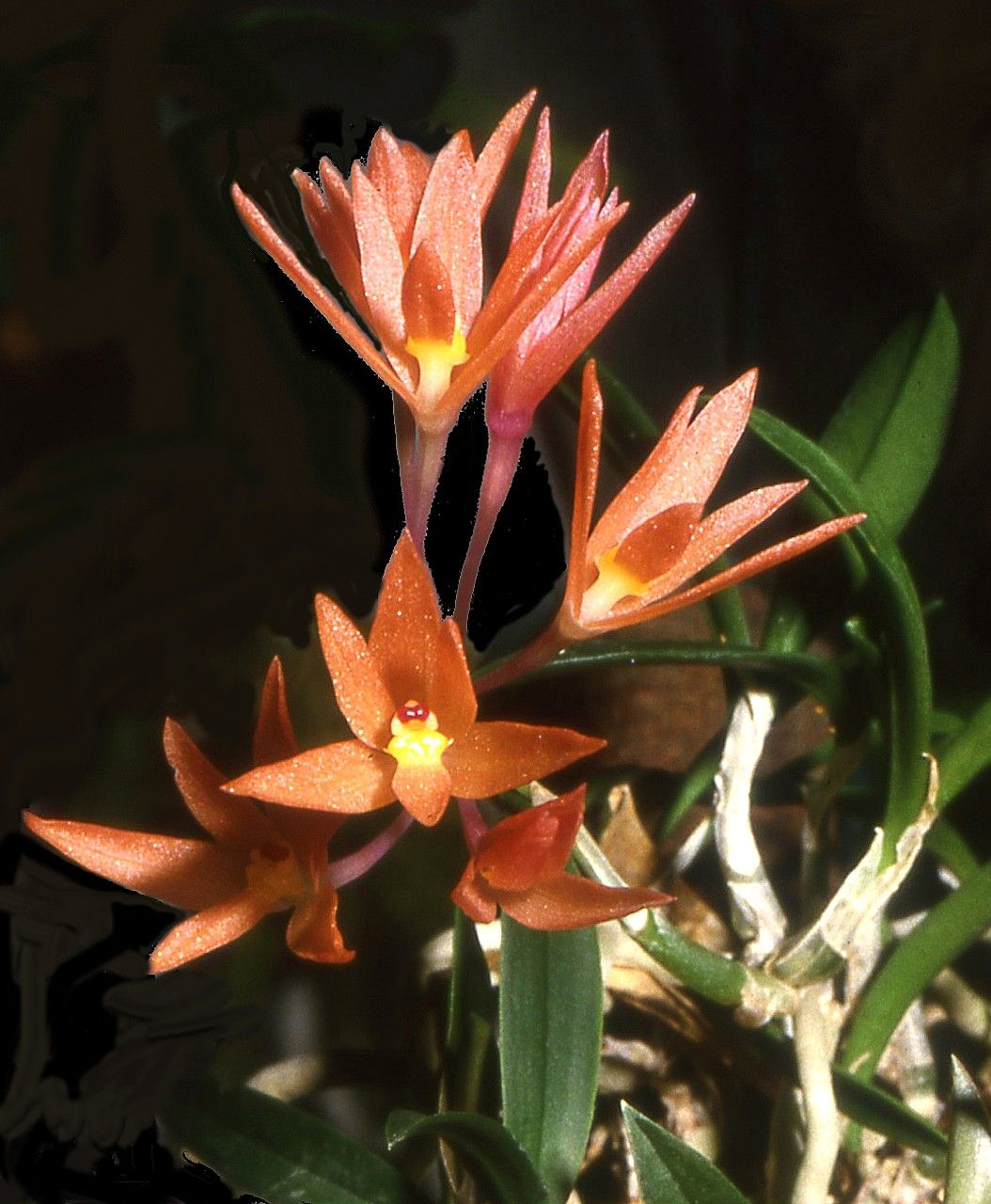

Scientific classification
- Kingdom: Plantae
- Clade: Embryophytes
- Clade: Tracheophytes
- Clade: Spermatophytes
- Clade: Angiosperms
- Clade: Monocots
- Order: Asparagales
- Family: Orchidaceae
- Subfamily: Epidendroideae
- Tribe: Epidendreae
- Subtribe: Laeliinae
- Genus: Alamania; Lex. (1825)
- Species: A. punicea

Binomial name
- Alamania punicea Lex. (1825)

Synonyms
- Epidendrum puniceum (Lex.) Rchb.f. (1862)

= Alamania =

Genus of orchids

Alamania punicea is a species of epiphytic orchids and the only species of the genus Alamania. It is endemic to Mexico and has two recognized varieties:

- Alamania punicea subsp. greenwoodiana Soto Arenas & R.Jiménez - Hidalgo, Oaxaca, Puebla, Querétaro, San Luis Potosí, Veracruz
- Alamania punicea subsp. punicea - similar range

== Description ==
Small, epiphytic plant that prefers a cool climate, it has an ovoid pseudobulb with 2 to 3 coriaceous, oblong-elliptic, obtuse, articular, basal and broad leaves that blooms in an erect, terminal, cluster-shaped inflorescence that can carry one to nine red-orange flowers. It produces its flowering in the spring and early summer.
