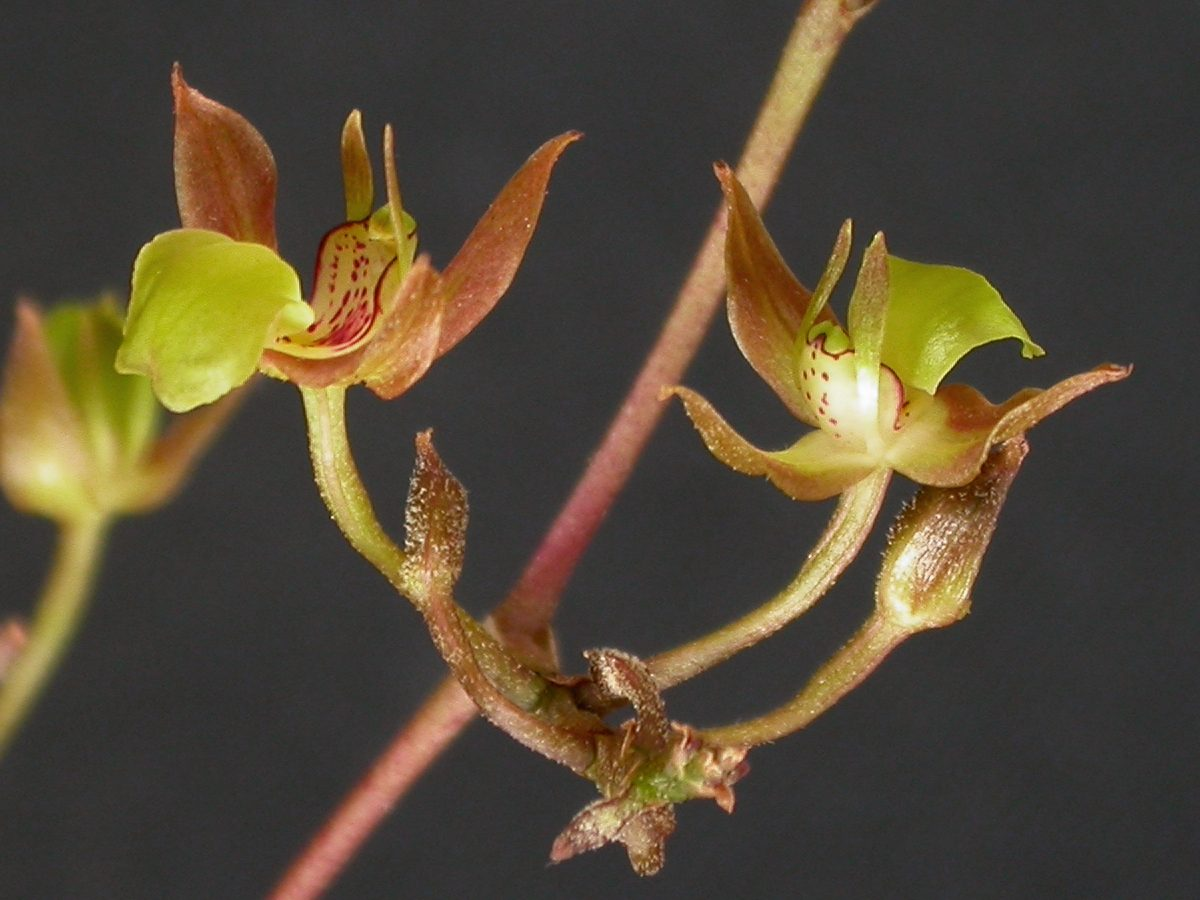
- Orleanesia yauaperyensis

Scientific classification
- Kingdom: Plantae
- Clade: Tracheophytes
- Clade: Angiosperms
- Clade: Monocots
- Order: Asparagales
- Family: Orchidaceae
- Subfamily: Epidendroideae
- Tribe: Epidendreae
- Subtribe: Laeliinae
- Genus: Orleanesia; Barb.Rodr. (1877)

Synonyms
- Huebneria Schltr., illegitimate homonym; Pseudorleanesia Rauschert

= Orleanesia =

Genus of orchids

Orleanesia is a genus of flowering plants from the orchid family, Orchidaceae. It contains 9 known species, all native to South America.

1. Orleanesia amazonica Barb.Rodr. - Brazil, Colombia, Venezuela, Bolivia, the Guianas
2. Orleanesia cuneipetala Pabst - Brazil
3. Orleanesia ecuadorana Dodson - Ecuador
4. Orleanesia maculata Garay - Venezuela
5. Orleanesia mineirosensis Garay - Brazil
6. Orleanesia peruviana C.Schweinf. - Peru
7. Orleanesia pleurostachys (Linden & Rchb.f.) Garay & Dunst. - Colombia, Venezuela, Peru, Ecuador
8. Orleanesia richteri Pabst - Brazil
9. Orleanesia yauaperyensis Barb.Rodr. - Brazil, Venezuela

== See also ==
- List of Orchidaceae genera
