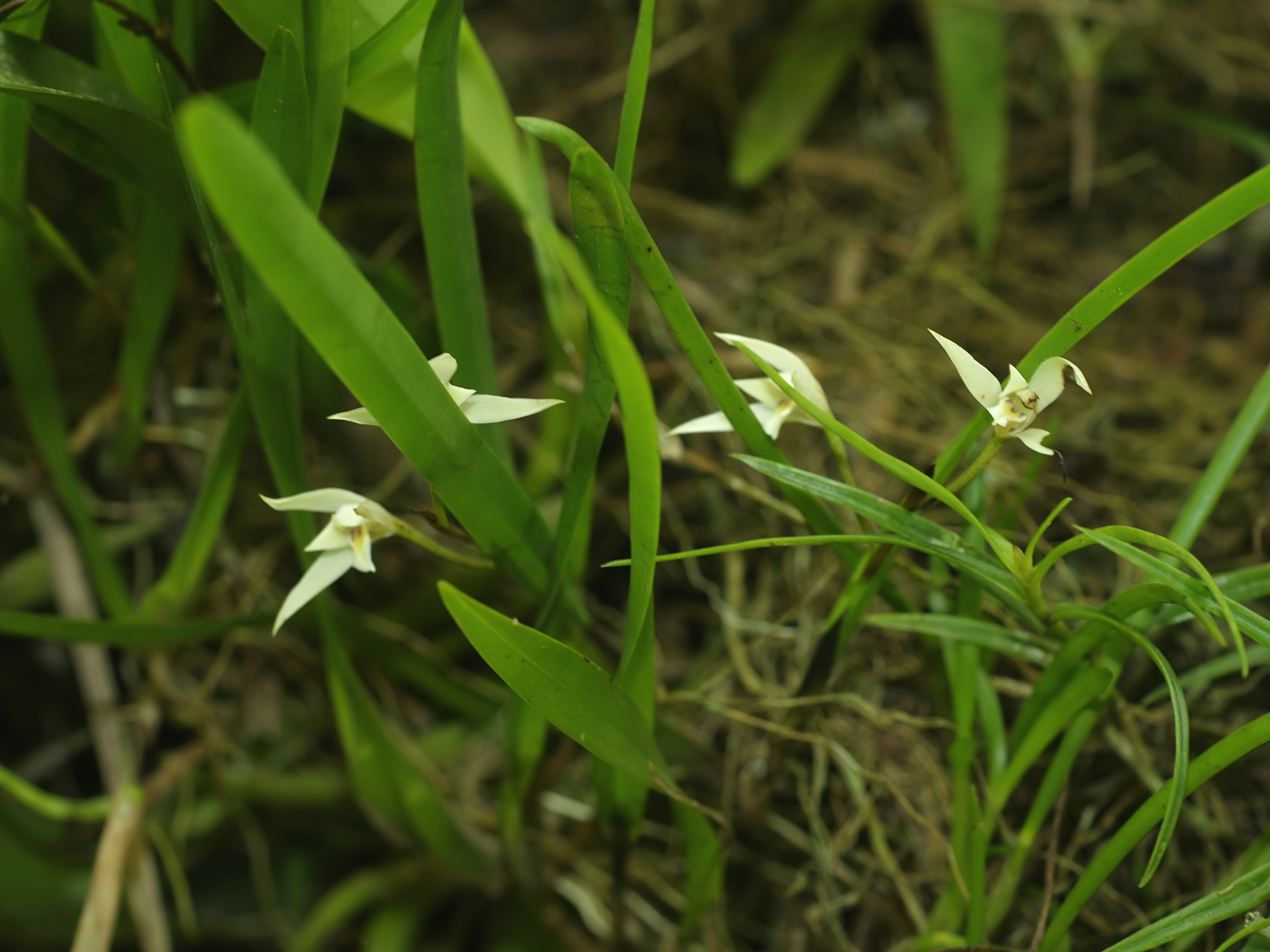
- Nidema boothii

Scientific classification
- Kingdom: Plantae
- Clade: Tracheophytes
- Clade: Angiosperms
- Clade: Monocots
- Order: Asparagales
- Family: Orchidaceae
- Subfamily: Epidendroideae
- Subtribe: Laeliinae
- Genus: Nidema; Britton & Millsp.

Type species
- Nidema ottonis (Rchb.f.) Britton & Millsp

= Nidema =

Genus of orchids

Nidema is a genus of flowering plants from the orchid family, Orchidaceae. It contains two known species, both native to the tropical Western Hemisphere.

== Species ==
Image	Name	Distribution	Elevation (m)
	Nidema boothii (Lindl.) Schltr.	Mexico, Central America, Bahamas	0 – 1500 meters
	Nidema ottonis (Rchb.f.) Britton & Millsp.	Central America, Bahamas, Greater Antilles, Trinidad, Venezuela, Guyana, Colombia, Ecuador, Peru, northern Brazil	0 – 1000 meters

== See also ==
- List of Orchidaceae genera
