= Moodnopsis perangusta =

Scientific classification
- Kingdom: Animalia
- Phylum: Arthropoda
- Class: Insecta
- Order: Lepidoptera
- Family: Pyralidae
- Genus: Moodnopsis
- Species: M. perangusta

Binomial name
- Moodnopsis perangusta (Dyar, 1919)

Synonyms
- Euzophera perangusta Dyar, 1919

Species of moth

Moodnopsis perangusta is a species of snout moth in the genus Moodnopsis. It is found in Trinidad.
