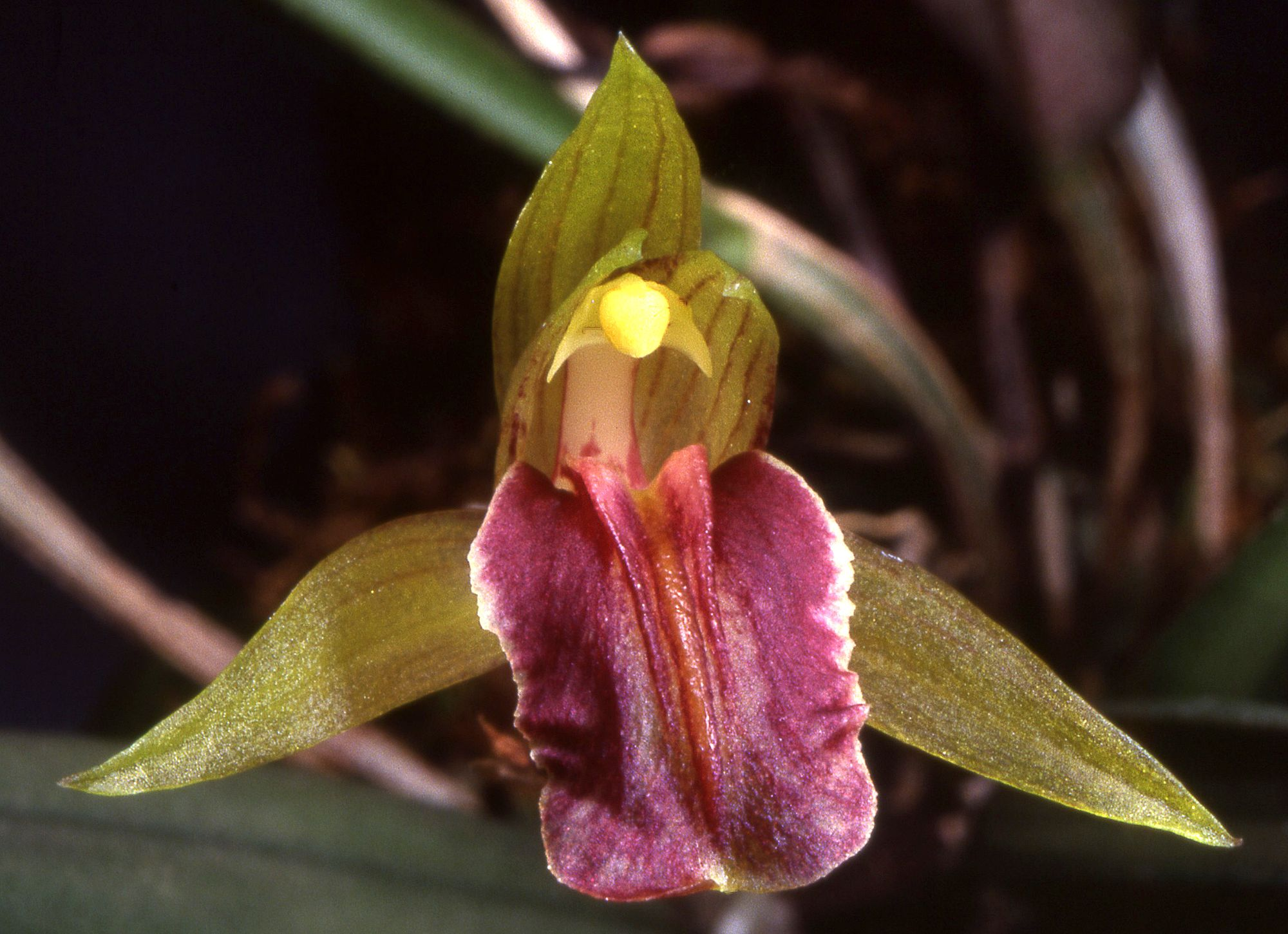
- Domingoa haematochila

Scientific classification
- Kingdom: Plantae
- Clade: Embryophytes
- Clade: Tracheophytes
- Clade: Angiosperms
- Clade: Monocots
- Order: Asparagales
- Family: Orchidaceae
- Subfamily: Epidendroideae
- Tribe: Epidendreae
- Subtribe: Laeliinae
- Genus: Domingoa; Schltr.

Type species
- Domingoa haematochila

Synonyms
- Nageliella L.O.Williams; Hartwegia Lindl.

= Domingoa =

Genus of orchids

Domingoa is a genus of orchids (family Orchidaceae), comprising four recognized species native to Mexico, Central America, Cuba, Hispaniola, and Mona in the Greater Antilles.

Rudolf Schlechter established the genus in 1913. Its name refers to Santo Domingo, a former name for Hispaniola. The genus name is abbreviated Dga. in cultivation.

== Taxonomy ==
Rudolf Schlechter described the genus, and it was published in Edwards's Botanical Register 28: misc. 23 in 1842. Domingoa is a generic name referring to Santo Domingo, an old name for Hispaniola.

=== Species ===
As of April 2023, Plants of the World Online accepts the following species:

Image	Name	Distribution	Elevation (m)
	Domingoa gemma (Rchb.f.) Van den Berg & Soto Arenas	Mexico (Puebla), Guatemala, Mexico and El Salvador	2,100 metres (6,900 ft)
	Domingoa haematochila (Rchb.f.) Carabia	Cuba, Haiti, Dominican Republic and Puerto Rico	100–800 metres (330–2,620 ft)
	Domingoa nodosa (Cogn.) Schltr. in I.Urban	Dominican Republic and Haiti	
	Domingoa purpurea (Lindl.) Van den Berg & Soto Arenas	El Salvador, Guatemala, Honduras, Mexico (Veracruz), Nicaragua	0–1,500 metres (0–4,921 ft)
	Domingoa × susiana Dod (D. haematochila × D. nodosa)	Dominican Republic	1,100 metres (3,600 ft)
