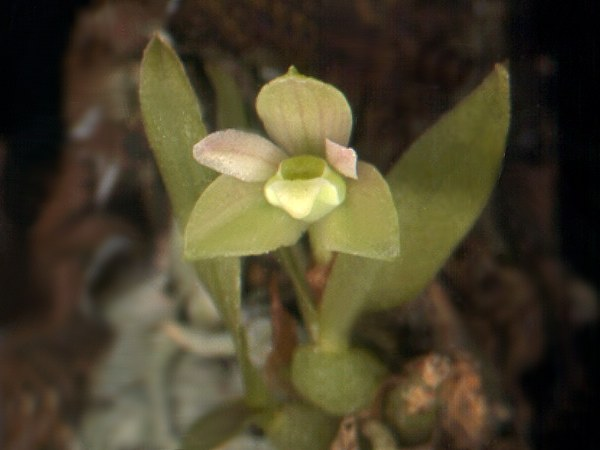
- Pygmaeorchis brasiliensis

Scientific classification
- Kingdom: Plantae
- Clade: Tracheophytes
- Clade: Angiosperms
- Clade: Monocots
- Order: Asparagales
- Family: Orchidaceae
- Subfamily: Epidendroideae
- Tribe: Epidendreae
- Subtribe: Laeliinae
- Genus: Pygmaeorchis; Brade

= Pygmaeorchis =

Genus of orchids

Pygmaeorchis is a genus of flowering plants from the orchid family, Orchidaceae. It contains two known species, both endemic to Brazil:

- Pygmaeorchis brasiliensis Brade - southeastern Brazil
- Pygmaeorchis seidelii Toscano & Moutinho - Minas Gerais

== See also ==
- List of Orchidaceae genera
