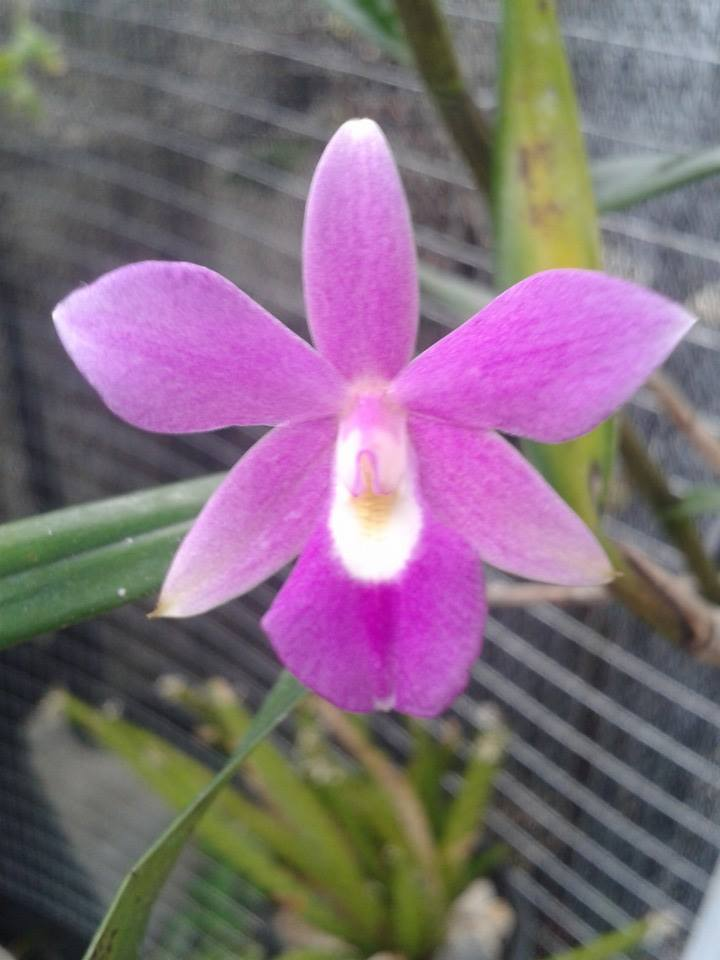
- Dimerandra emarginata

Scientific classification
- Kingdom: Plantae
- Clade: Tracheophytes
- Clade: Angiosperms
- Clade: Monocots
- Order: Asparagales
- Family: Orchidaceae
- Subfamily: Epidendroideae
- Tribe: Epidendreae
- Subtribe: Laeliinae
- Genus: Dimerandra; Schltr.

= Dimerandra =

Genus of orchids

Dimerandra, abbreviated Dmd. in the horticultural trade, is a genus of flowering plants from the orchid family, Orchidaceae. The group is found across tropical America: southern Mexico (as far north as Veracruz), Central America, the West Indies and northern South America.

== Species ==
Kew, in its World Checklist of Selected Plant Families, has accepted 8 species in this genus:

1. Dmd. buenaventurae Kraenzl. Siegerist (1986) - Colombia
2. Dmd. carnosiflora Siegerist (1986) - Brazil, Peru
3. Dmd. elegans (Focke) Siegerist (1986) - Costa Rica, Panama, Colombia, Venezuela, northern Brazil, Trinidad, Suriname, Guyana, French Guinea
4. Dmd. emarginata (G.Mey.) Hoehne (1934) 2n = 40 - southern Mexico, Central America, Trinidad, northern South America
5. Dmd. latipetala Siegerist (1986) - Colombia, Central America
6. Dmd. rimbachii (Schltr.) Schltr. (1922) - Ecuador
7. Dmd. stenopetala (Hook.) Schltr. (1922) 2n = 40 - Jamaica, Trinidad, northern South America
8. Dmd. tarapotana Dodson & D.E.Benn. (1989) - Peru

== See also ==
- List of Orchidaceae genera

== References and external links ==
- Pridgeon, A.M., Cribb, P.J., Chase, M.A. & Rasmussen, F. eds. (1999). Genera Orchidacearum 1. Oxford Univ. Press.
- Pridgeon, A.M., Cribb, P.J., Chase, M.A. & Rasmussen, F. eds. (2001). Genera Orchidacearum 2. Oxford Univ. Press.
- Pridgeon, A.M., Cribb, P.J., Chase, M.A. & Rasmussen, F. eds. (2003). Genera Orchidacearum 3. Oxford Univ. Press
- Berg Pana, H. 2005. Handbuch der Orchideen-Namen. Dictionary of Orchid Names. Dizionario dei nomi delle orchidee. Ulmer, Stuttgart
