= Moodnopsis inveterella =

Scientific classification
- Kingdom: Animalia
- Phylum: Arthropoda
- Class: Insecta
- Order: Lepidoptera
- Family: Pyralidae
- Genus: Moodnopsis
- Species: M. inveterella

Binomial name
- Moodnopsis inveterella (Dyar, 1919)

Synonyms
- Campyloplesis inveterella Dyar, 1919

Species of moth

Moodnopsis inveterella is a species of snout moth in the genus Moodnopsis. It was described by Harrison Gray Dyar Jr. in 1919 and is known from Guatemala.
