= Moodnopsis parallela =

Scientific classification
- Domain: Eukaryota
- Kingdom: Animalia
- Phylum: Arthropoda
- Class: Insecta
- Order: Lepidoptera
- Family: Pyralidae
- Genus: Moodnopsis
- Species: M. parallela

Binomial name
- Moodnopsis parallela Heinrich, 1956

Species of moth

Moodnopsis parallela is a species of snout moth in the genus Moodnopsis. It is found in Brazil.
