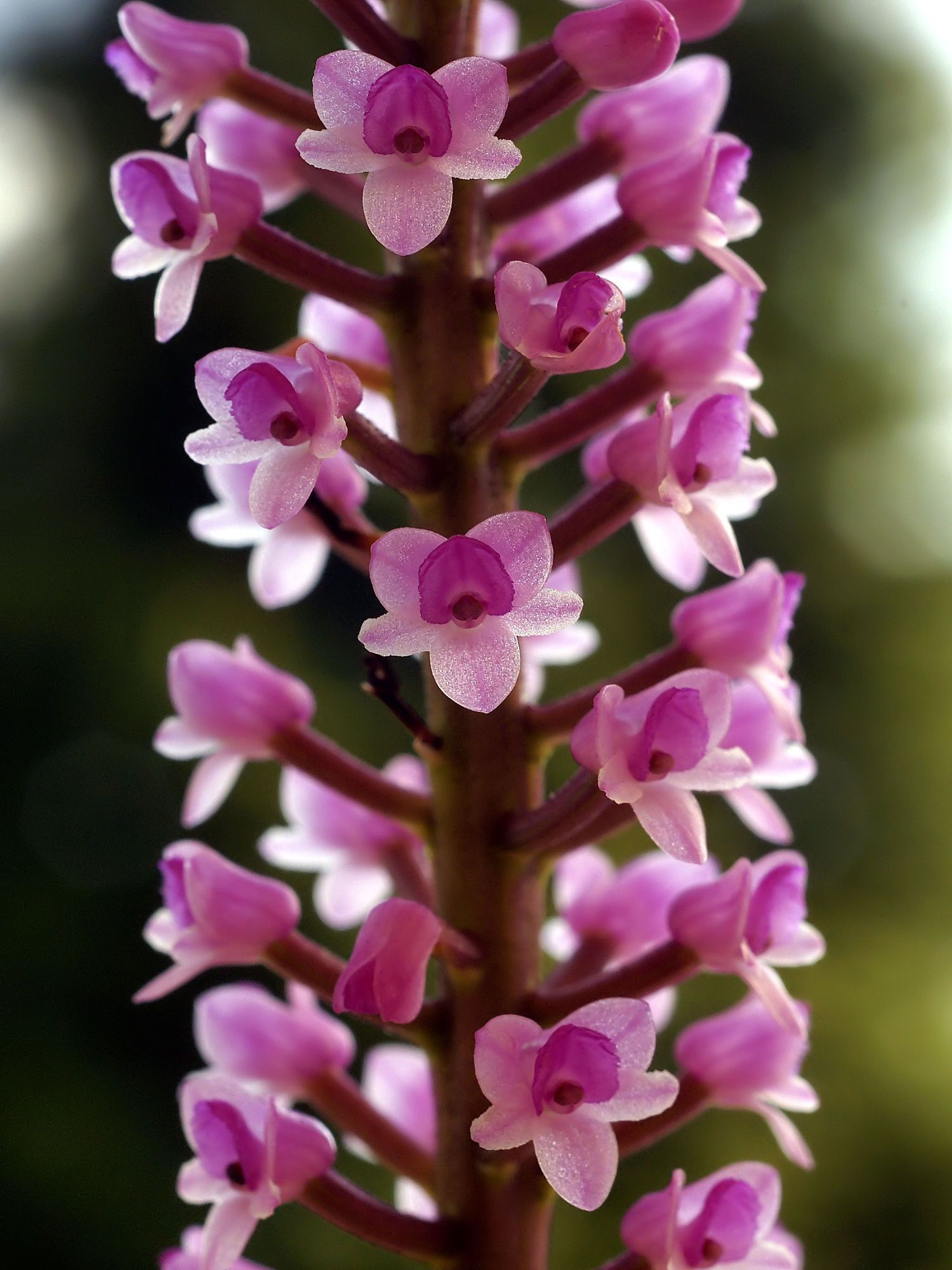
- Arpophyllum spicatum

Scientific classification
- Kingdom: Plantae
- Clade: Tracheophytes
- Clade: Angiosperms
- Clade: Monocots
- Order: Asparagales
- Family: Orchidaceae
- Subfamily: Epidendroideae
- Tribe: Epidendreae
- Subtribe: Laeliinae
- Genus: Arpophyllum; La Llave & Lex.

Type species
- Arpophyllum spicatum La Llave & Lex.

= Arpophyllum =

Genus of orchids

Arpophyllum is a genus of flowering plants from the orchid family, Orchidaceae. It contains 3 species, native to Mexico, Belize, Central America, Colombia, Venezuela and Jamaica.

== Species ==
As of May 2014, three species were recognized:

- Arpophyllum giganteum Hartw. ex Lindl. - Veracruz, Chiapas, Oaxaca, Central America, Colombia, Venezuela, Jamaica
  - Arpophyllum giganteum subsp. alpinum (Lindl.) Dressler - Chiapas, El Salvador, Guatemala, Honduras
  - Arpophyllum giganteum subsp. giganteum - Veracruz, Chiapas, Oaxaca, Central America, Colombia, Venezuela, Jamaica
  - Arpophyllum giganteum subsp. medium (Rchb.f.) Dressler - Veracruz, Chiapas, Oaxaca, Central America
- Arpophyllum laxiflorum Pfitzer - eastern, central and southern Mexico
- Arpophyllum spicatum Lex. in P.de La Llave & J.M.de Lexarza - eastern, central and southern Mexico; south to Costa Rica

== See also ==
- List of Orchidaceae genera
