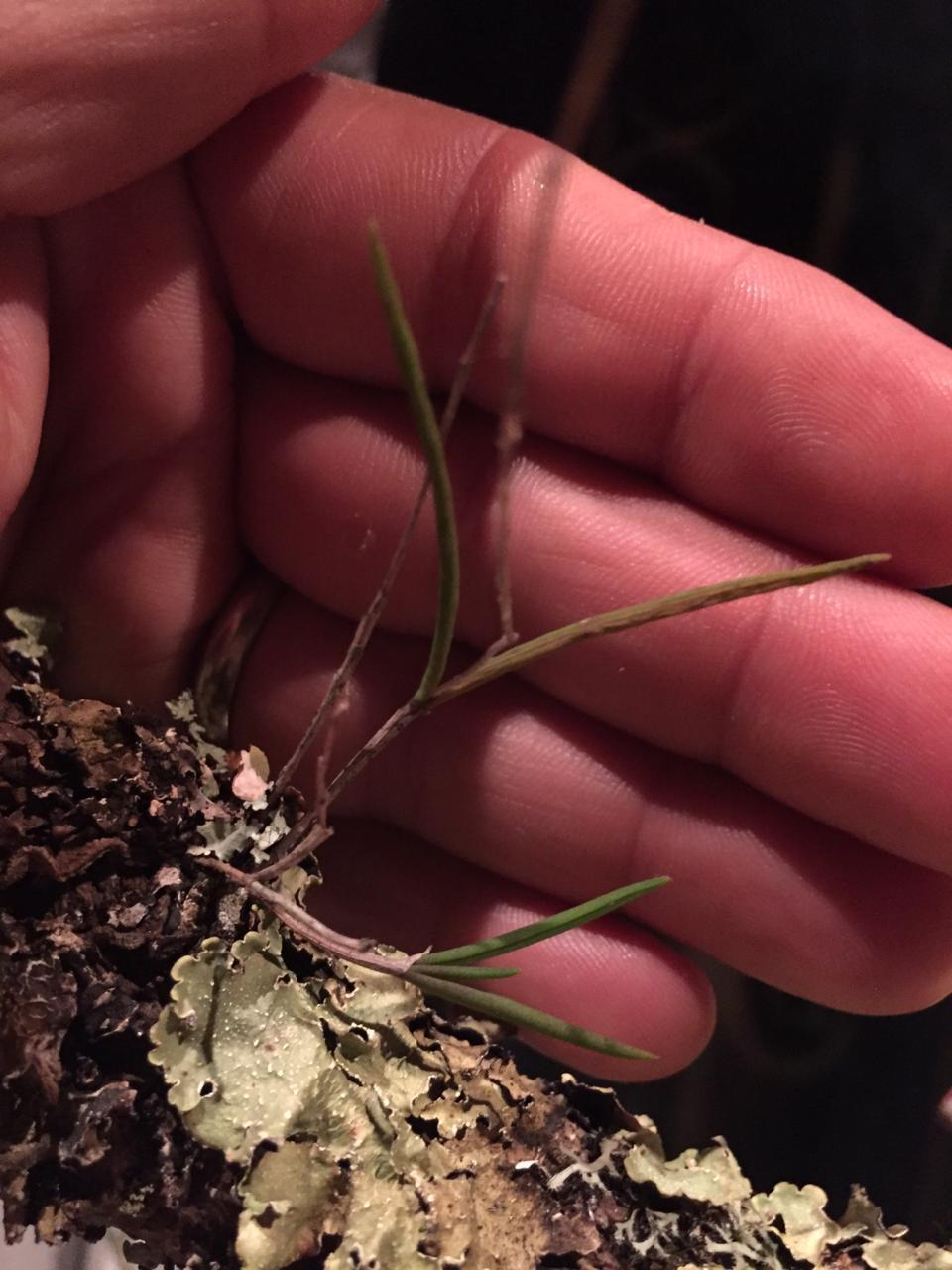
- Microepidendrum subulatifolium

Scientific classification
- Kingdom: Plantae
- Clade: Tracheophytes
- Clade: Angiosperms
- Clade: Monocots
- Order: Asparagales
- Family: Orchidaceae
- Subfamily: Epidendroideae
- Tribe: Epidendreae
- Subtribe: Laeliinae
- Genus: Microepidendrum; Brieger ex W.E.Higgins
- Species: M. subulatifolium

Binomial name
- Microepidendrum subulatifolium (A.Rich. & Galeotti) W.E.Higgins

Synonyms
- Encyclia subulatifolia (A.Rich. & Galeotti) Dressler; Epidendrum subulatifolium A.Rich. & Galeotti

= Microepidendrum =

Genus of plants

Microepidendrum is a monotypic genus of flowering plants in the family Orchidaceae, with a single species Microepidendrum subulatifolium, native to southwest Mexico. The genus was established in 2002. Microepidendrum subulatifolium was first described in 1845 as Epidendrum subulatifolium.
