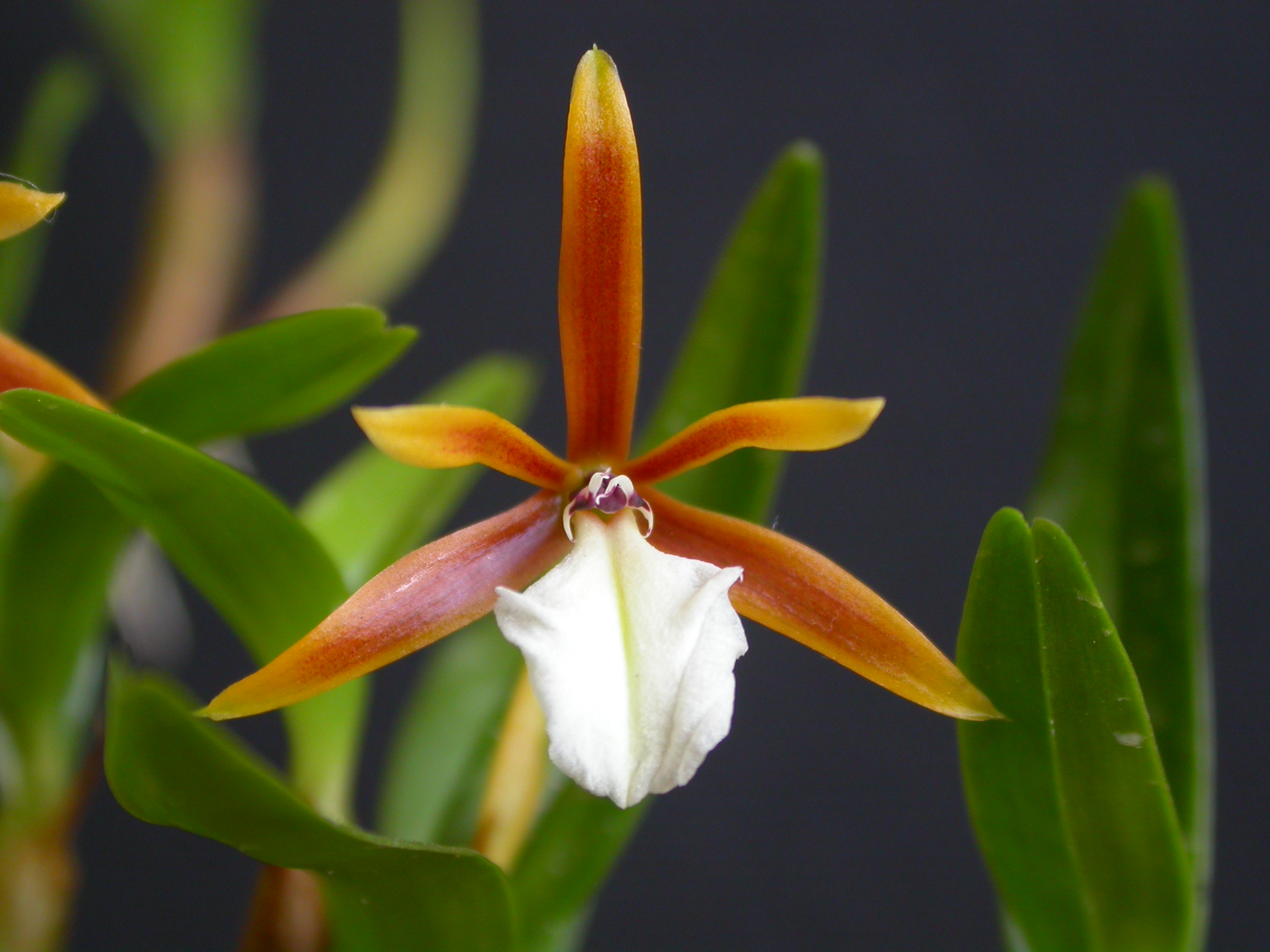

Scientific classification
- Kingdom: Plantae
- Clade: Tracheophytes
- Clade: Angiosperms
- Clade: Monocots
- Order: Asparagales
- Family: Orchidaceae
- Subfamily: Epidendroideae
- Tribe: Epidendreae
- Subtribe: Laeliinae
- Genus: Dinema; Lindl.
- Species: D. polybulbon

Binomial name
- Dinema polybulbon (Sw.) Lindl.

Synonyms
- Epidendrum polybulbon Sw.; Encyclia polybulbon (Sw.) Dressler; Bulbophyllum occidentale Spreng.; Epidendrum polybulbon var. luteoalbum Miethe; Epidendrum cubincola Borhidi; Dinema cubincola (Borhidi) H.Dietr.

= Dinema (plant) =

Genus of orchids

Dinema is a genus of orchids. It is represented by a single currently accepted species, Dinema polybulbon, native to Mexico, Central America, and the Caribbean.

== Description ==
They are epiphytes or lithophytes; with pseudobulbs 10 mm long and 6 mm wide, spaced 1–1.5 cm apart on the creeping rhizome, slightly compressed, yellowish-green, apically bi-foliate. The leaves are 15 mm long and 8 mm wide, obtuse, emarginate, shiny green. The inflorescence is uniflora or rarely with 2 flowers, terminal, the flowers 15 mm in diameter, the sepals and the petals are yellowish-brown, the lip is white to yellowish-white with the yellow nail, the column is white with purple spots; the sepals 9 mm long and 2 mm wide, shortly acuminate; petals 9 mm long and 1.5 mm wide; the simple lip, 9 mm long and 6 mm wide, unguiculate, adnate to the base of the spine, with the disc dilated and with undulated edges, thickened nail 2 mm wide; the column is 5 mm long, with 2 conspicuous extensions at the apex, the anther is terminal, pollinia 4; ovary 15 mm long, pedicellate. The fruits are ellipsoid capsules.

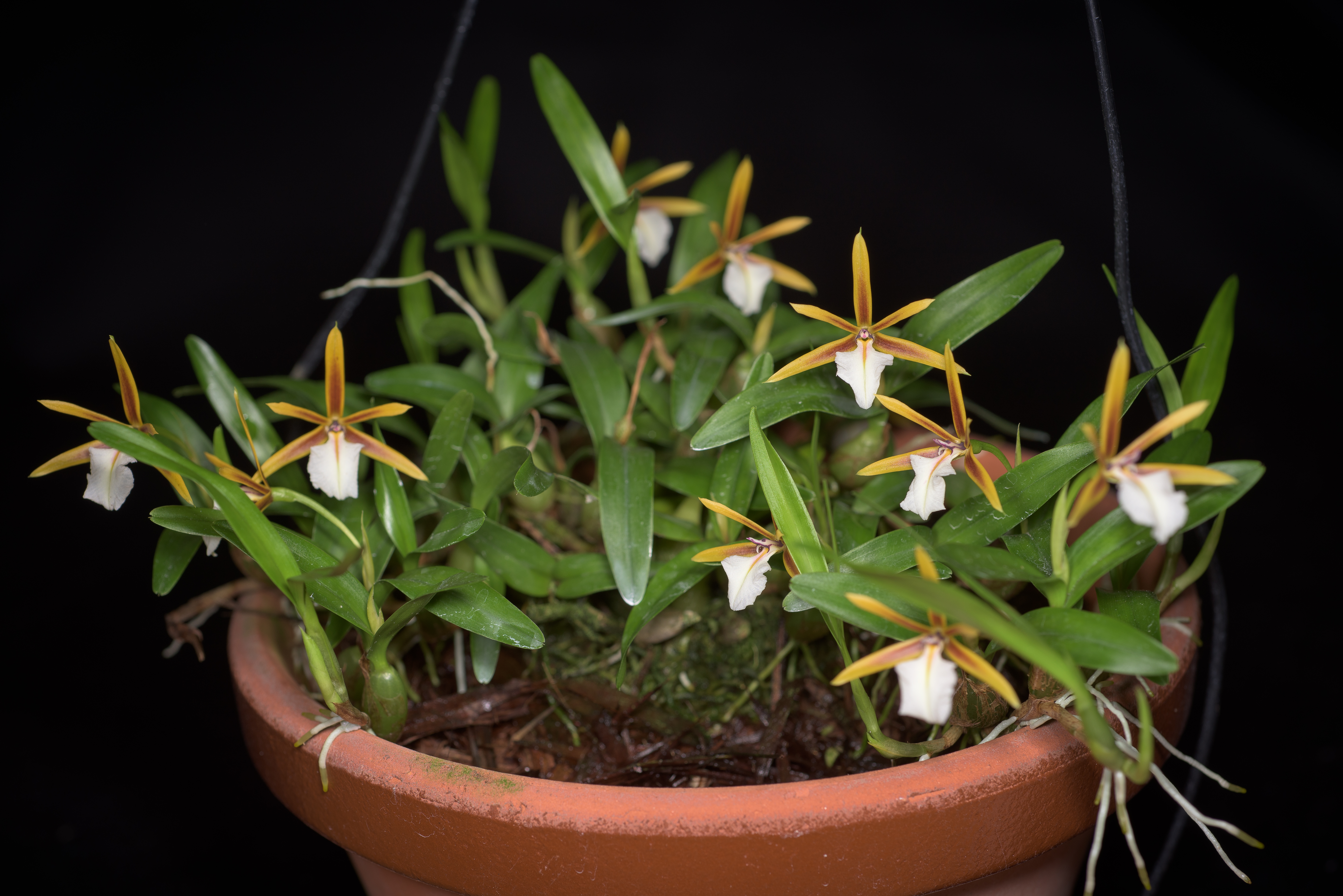
Plant

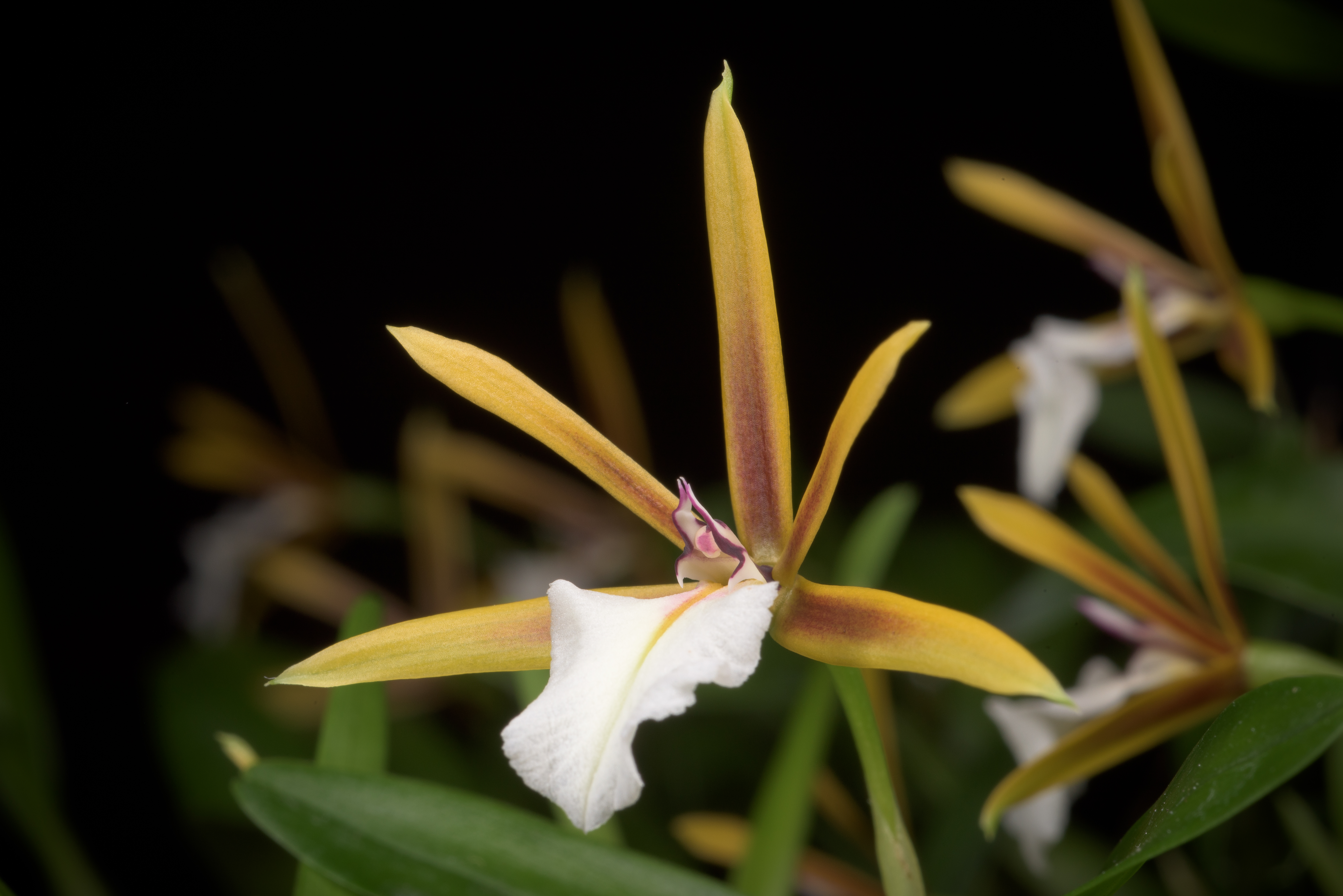
Flower

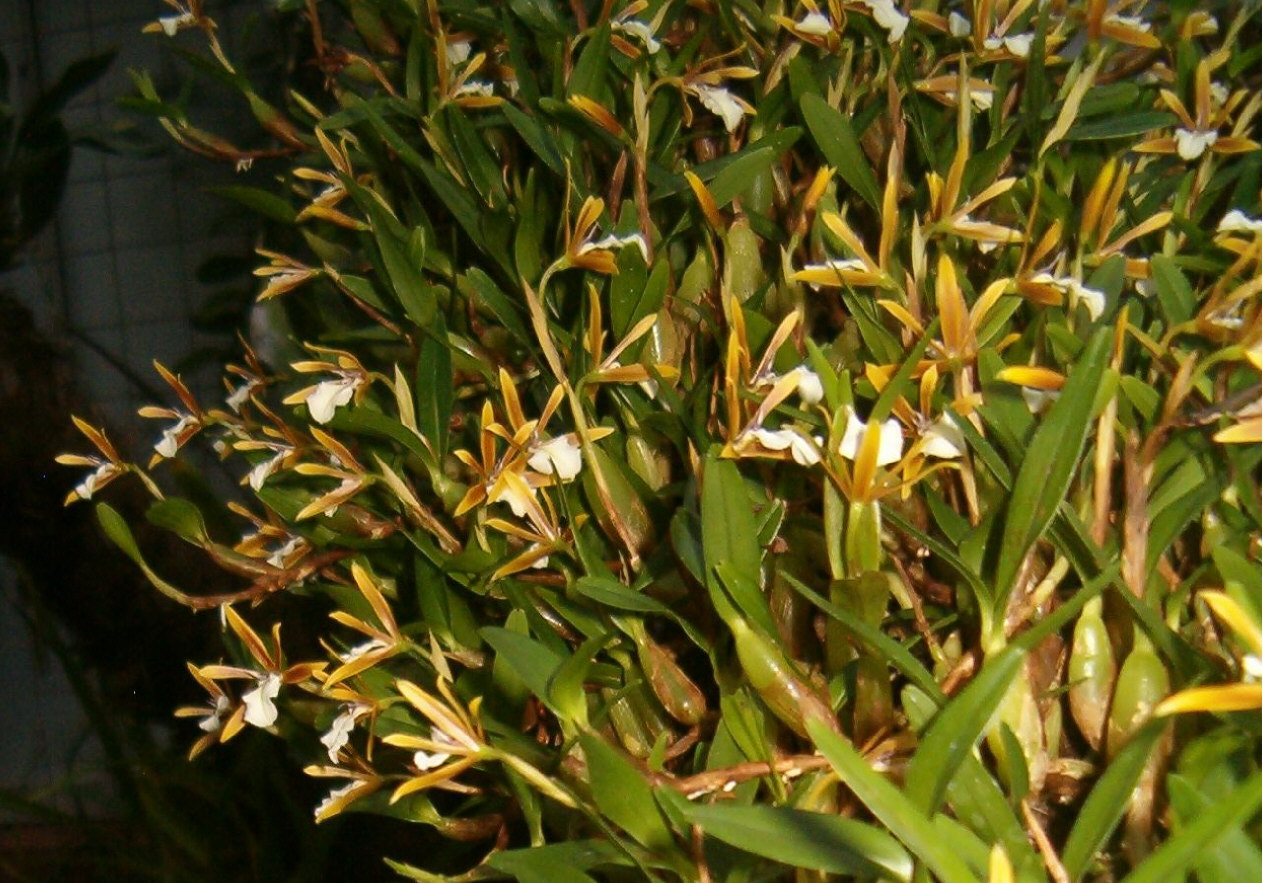
Plant growth habit

== Distribution ==
It is found in Mexico, Belize, El Salvador, Guatemala, Honduras, Nicaragua, Cuba and Jamaica. Uncommon species in habitat, found in humid mixed forests, at elevations of 1000–1400 meters; it blooms in November, and bears fruit in August.

== Taxonomy ==
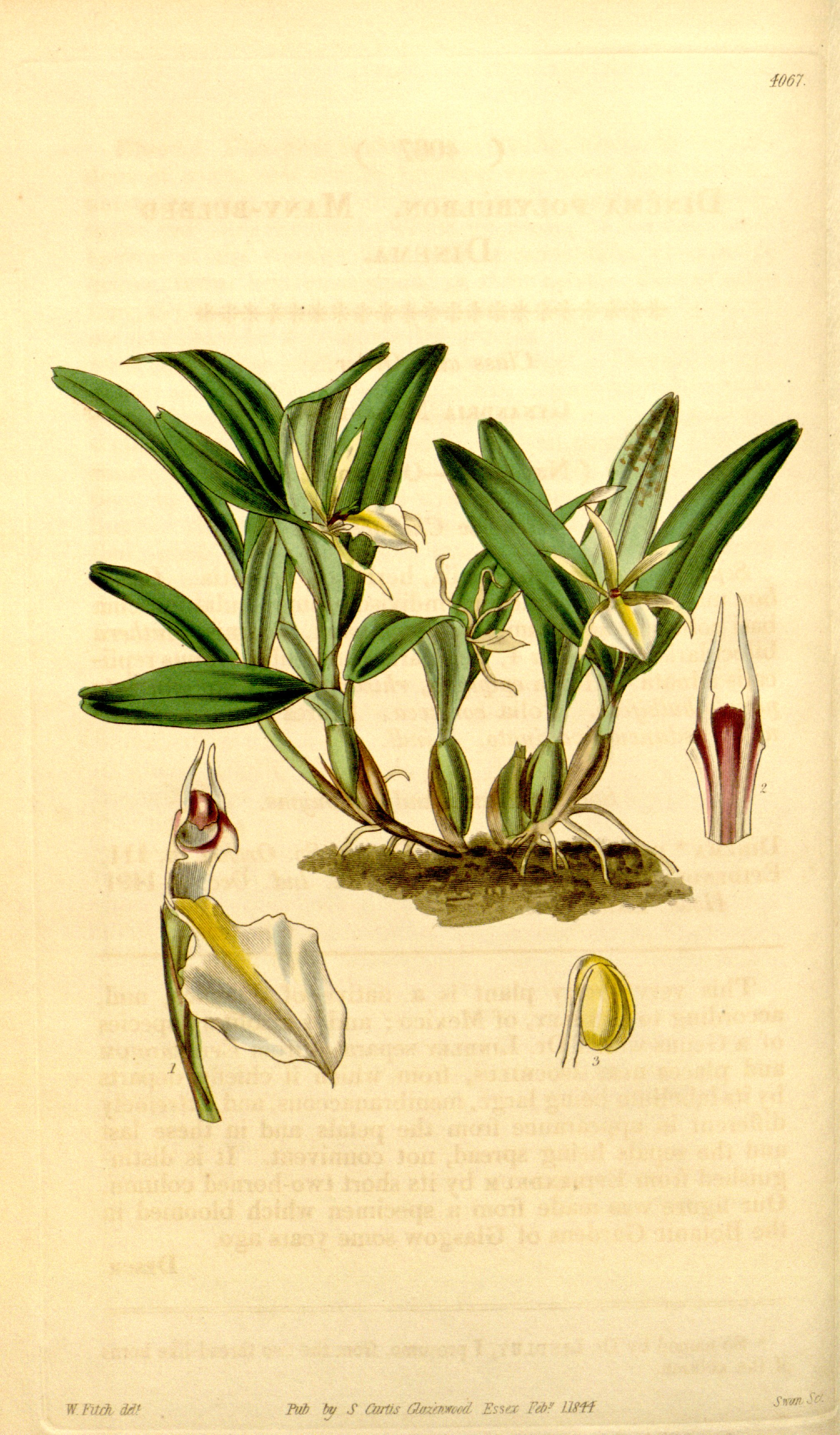
Dinema polybulbon from Curtis's Botanical Magazine vol. 70 (N.S. 17) pl. 4067

This species can be recognized by the small size, the relatively large solitary flowers, the simple white to yellowish-white lip, and the cornicle-shaped extensions of the column. It is a monotypic genus.

Dinema polybulbon was described by (Sw.) Lindl. and published in The Genera and Species of Orchidaceous Plants 111. 1831

Synonyms

- Epidendrum polybulbon Sw., Prodr.: 124 (1788).
- Encyclia polybulbon (Sw.) Dressler, Brittonia 13: 265 (1961).
- Bulbophyllum occidentale Spreng., Syst. Veg. 3: 732 (1826).
- Epidendrum polybulbon var. luteoalbum Miethe, Orchis 8: 33 (1914).
- Epidendrum cubincola Borhidi, Acta Bot. Acad. Sci. Hung. 22: 295 (1976 publ. 1977).
- Dinema cubincola (Borhidi) H.Dietr., Wiss. Z. Friedrich-Schiller-Univ. Jena, Math.-Naturwiss. Reihe 29: 524 (1980)
