= × Schombocattleya =

Genus of orchids

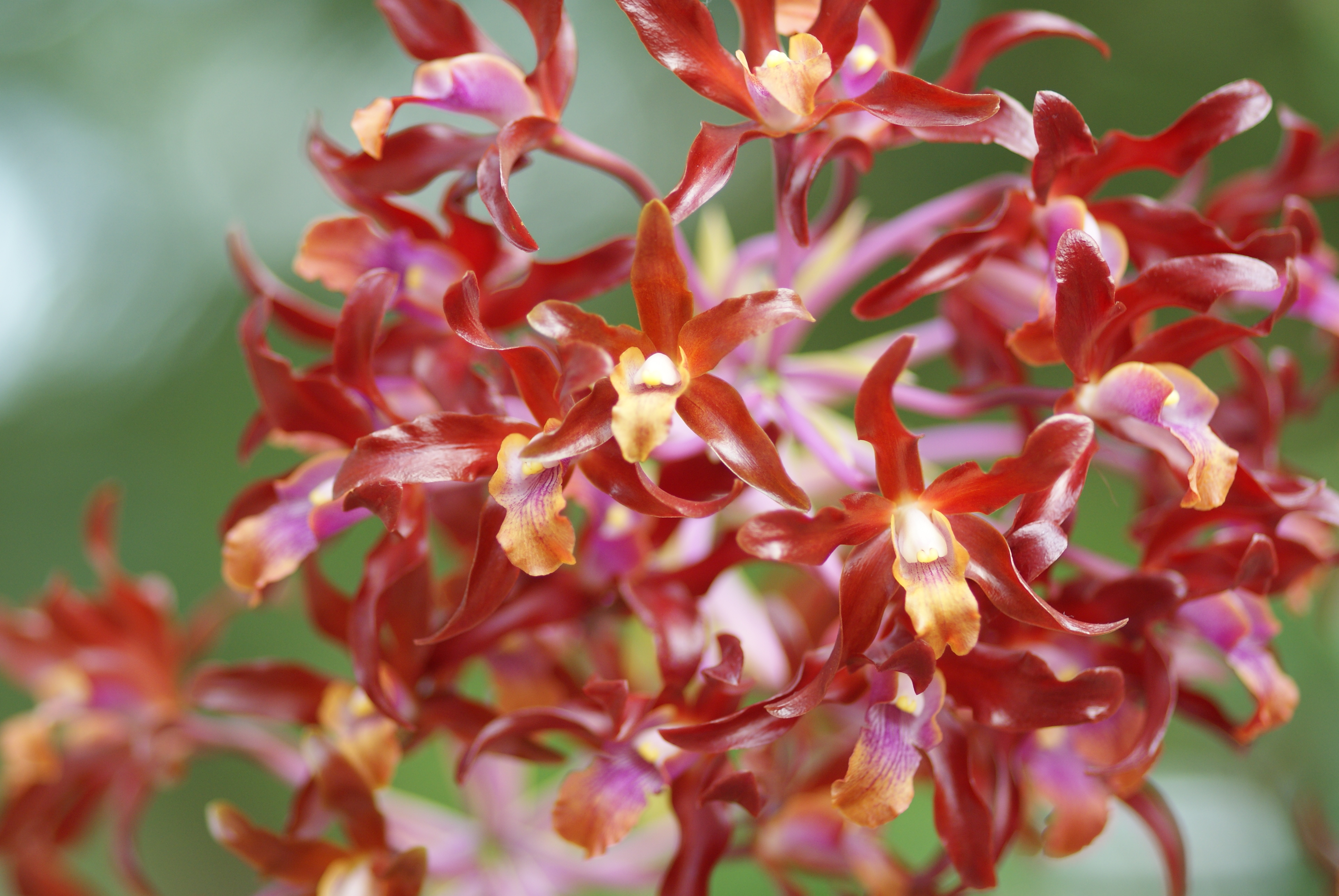

× Schombocattleya (from Cattleya and Schomburgkia, its parent genera) is a historic intergeneric hybrid of orchids since all species of Schomburgkia have been transferred to either Laelia or Myrmecophila. The genus was abbreviated Smbc. in the horticultural trade. Plants of the World Online treats it as a synonym of × Laeliocattleya.
