= Domingo Bello y Espinosa =

Spanish lawyer and botanist

Domingo Bello y Espinosa (31 July 1817, La Laguna, Canary Islands – 21 January 1884) was a Spanish lawyer and botanist.

He earned his doctorate at the University of San Fernando (now the University of La Laguna), later serving as secretary of the Colegio de Abogados in Santa Cruz de Tenerife (1845–47). In 1850 he emigrated to Puerto Rico, where he maintained a successful law practice. Here he befriended Leopold Krug, a German consul stationed in Mayagüez, who like Bello y Espinosa, was an amateur botanist. With Krug, he collected flora native to the island, and in the meantime, took copious notes of the various plants.

In 1880 he returned to La Laguna and published the two volume "Apuntes Para la Flora de Puerto Rico" (1881, 1883), an annotated checklist of 964 species that was based on his Puerto Rican collections. In this work, however, he failed to make any mention of Krug's significant contributions to the project. Bello y Espinosa's original plant collections from Puerto Rico were eventually destroyed by insects.

In 1880 Bello y Espinosa published a book of prose, titled "Un Jardín Canario".
