= Donald D. Dod =

American botanist

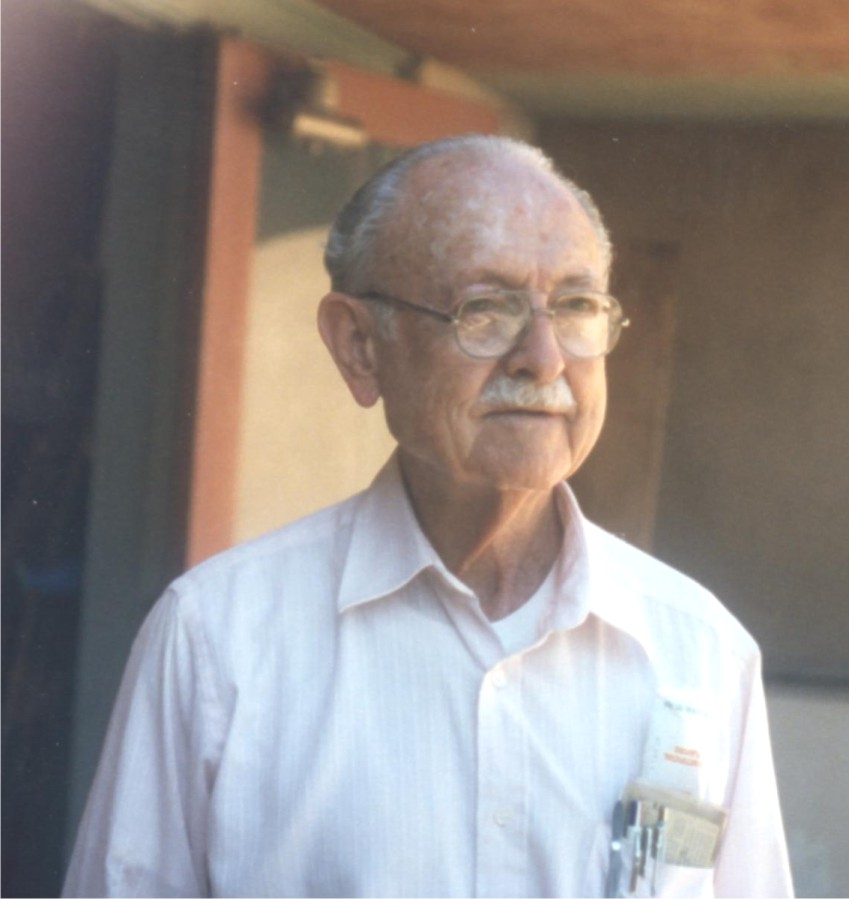
- Born: October 10, 1912; Kansas City, Missouri
- Died: April 1, 2008 (aged 95); West Virginia
- Spouse: Annabelle Jean Stockton
- Scientific career
- Fields: Botany, orchidology

The Reverend Donald Dungan Dod (October 10, 1912 – April 1, 2008) was an American missionary and orchidologist.

== Life ==
Dod attended Long Beach Junior College and graduated from the University of California, Berkeley with a major in chemistry. After a stint in the oil industry, he entered San Francisco Theological Seminary in San Anselmo, California, where he met his future wife, Annabelle Jean Stockton (who went by Tudy). They graduated with a master's degree in divinity and a master's in Christian education respectively.

In 1946, the Dods established a Presbyterian ministry in El Guacio in western Puerto Rico, which included a health clinic, a social work program, and public health efforts., among other activities. During their 17-year stay in Puerto Rico, they “became enamored of the flora and fauna of Puerto Rico”. While Tudy became interested in birds, Donald became an well-versed amateur orchidologist, discovering over fifty new orchid species and (having taught himself the rudiments of botanical Latin) describing many of them himself.

The Dods moved to the Dominican Republic in 1964 and remained there until Donald's retirement in 1988. Continuing his varied activities as minister and social worker, Donald became instrumental in the establishment of the Santo Domingo Botanical Gardens and the Museum of Natural History there, as well as in the creation of natural reserves on the island, among other causes.

Dod was a research associate at the Department of Botany of the University of California, Berkeley.

== Honors ==
The Dods were made Caballeros de Colón, the highest civilian award of the Dominican Republic.

Named after him is the Parque Nacional Donald Dod, as well as the orchids:

- Epidendrum dodii (L. Sánchez & Hágsater)
- Lepanthopsis dodii (Garay)
- Psychilis dodii (Sauleda)
- Schiedeella dodii (Burns-Bal.)
- Specklinia dodii (Garay, Luer)
- Lepanthes dodiana (W. R. Stimson)
- Trigonochilum dodianum (Ackerman & Chiron, Königer)

while orchids named after Annabelle Dod include:

- Epidendrum annabellae (Nir)
- Lepanthes tudiana (Dod)
- Psychilis × tudiana (Dod)

== Publications ==
=== by D. Dod ===
- DOD, D.D. 1976 Orquideas Dominicanas nuevas 1. Moscosoa 1:50–54.
- DOD, D.D. 1971 Orquideas Dominicanas nuevas. Moscosoa 1:39–54.
- DOD, D.D. 1978 Orquideas dominicanas nuevas 3. Moscosoa 1:49–63.
- DOD, D.D. 1983 Orquideas (Orchidaceae) Dominicanas nuevas para la Espaniola y otras notas 4. Moscosoa 2:2–18.
- DOD, D.D. 1984 Quisqueya: a new and endemic genus from the island of Hispaniola 1. Bol. Soc. Dominicana de Orquideologia 2:40–52.
- DOD, D.D. 1984 Orquideas (Orchidaceae) Dominicanas nuevas para la Espaniola y otras notas 5. Moscosoa 3:100–120.
- DOD, D.D. 1984 Quisqueya: a new and endemic genus from the island of Hispaniola 2. Bol. Soc. Dominicana de Orquideologia 3:16–30.
- DOD, D.D. 1986 Orquideas (Orchidaceae) Dominicanas nuevas à la ciencia, endemicas en la Hispaniola. Moscosoa 4:133–187.
- DOD, D.D. 1993 Orquideas (Orchidaceae) Dominicanas nuevas para la Espaniola y otras notas 8. Moscosoa 7:153–155.
- DOD, D.D. 1993 Orquideas (Orchidaceae) nuevas para la ciencia, endemicas de la Espaniola 3. Moscosoa 7:157–165.
- DOD, D.D. 1993 El genero Epidendrum (Orchidaceae) de la Espaniola: Introduccion y clave 3. Moscosoa 7:167–170.
- HESPENHEIDE, H.A. & DOD, D.D. 1990 El genero Lepanthes (Orchidaceae) de la Española 2. Moscosoa 6:167–195.

=== by A. S. Dod ===
- Annabelle S. Dod. Endangered and endemic birds of the Dominican Republic. Cypress House, 1992. Fort Bragg, CA.
- Annabelle S. Dod. Guía de campo para las aves de la República Dominicana. Museo Nacional de Historia Natural, 2002. Santo Domingo, R. D.
- Annabelle S. Dod; José Osorio; Laura Rathe de Cambiaso. Aves de la República Dominicana. Museo Nacional de Historia Natural, 1978. Santo Domingo, R. D.
