= Hort. =

Term used in botanical nomenclature

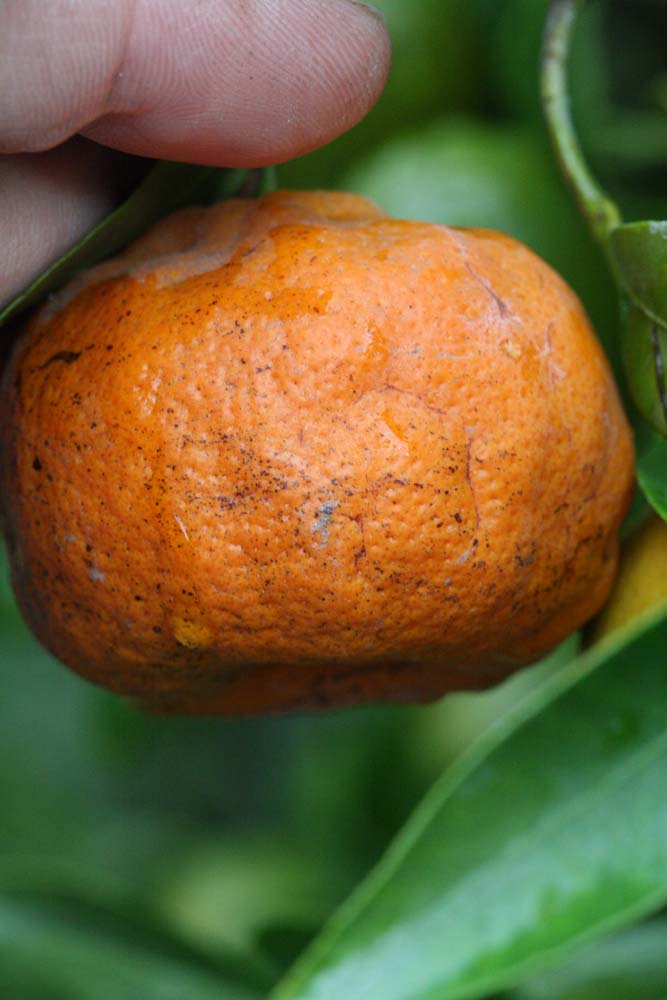
The cleopatra mandarin is classified as Citrus reshni Hort. ex Tanaka.

Hort., in the taxonomy of plants, is an abbreviation used to indicate a name that saw significant use in the horticultural literature (often of the 19th century and earlier), but was never properly published. This system was developed by Tyozaburo Tanaka to deal with the problem of citrus taxonomy.

== Origins and usage ==
"Hort.," short for hortulanus, was proposed in order that non-wild, cultivated plants known and described in agriculture or gardening circles can be examined by taxonomists to determine if the plants can be established as species and published. The proposal was made at the 1928 "International Congress of Horticulture of Vienna" by citrus scholar Tyozaburo Tanaka.

For example, for the clementine, the following binomial name was adopted by Tanaka:

Citrus clementina hort. ex Tanaka
