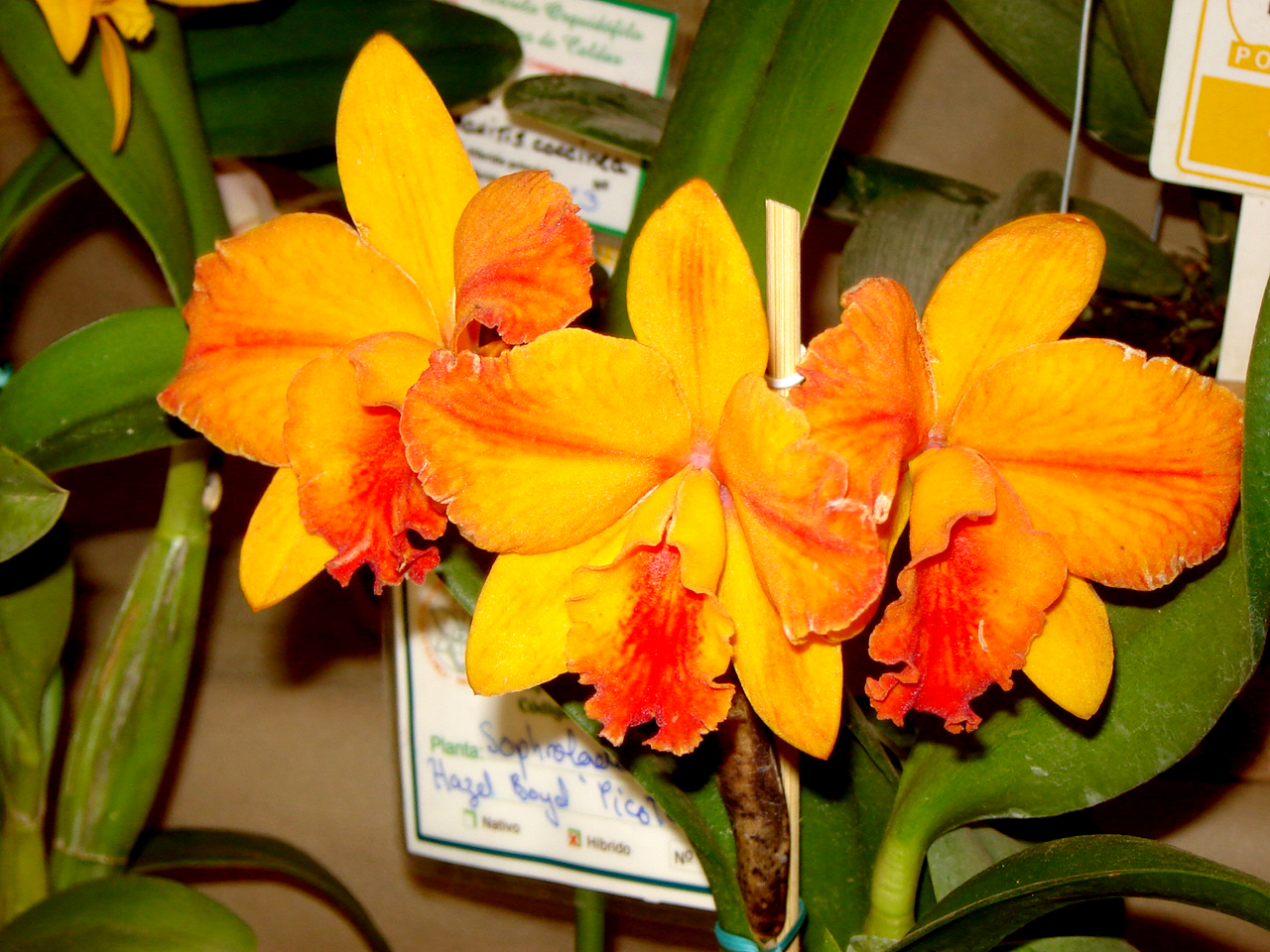
- Ctt. Hazel Boyd (formerly Slc. Hazel Boyd)

Scientific classification
- Kingdom: Plantae
- Clade: Tracheophytes
- Clade: Angiosperms
- Clade: Monocots
- Order: Asparagales
- Family: Orchidaceae
- Subfamily: Epidendroideae
- Tribe: Epidendreae
- Subtribe: Laeliinae
- Genus: × Cattlianthe; J.M.H.Shaw

= × Cattlianthe =

Genus of orchids

× Cattlianthe, abbreviated Ctt. in the horticultural trade, is the orchid nothogenus for intergeneric hybrid greges containing at least one ancestor species from each of the two ancestral genera Cattleya and Guarianthe, and from no other genera.

Since orchids in Guarianthe were placed in Cattleya before 2003, many orchids in × Cattlianthe were previously placed directly in Cattleya.

== Notable hybrids ==
Notable hybrids, known as greges, include the following:

- Ctt. Jewel Box (formerly Slc. Jewel Box), a hybrid cross of Guarianthe aurantiaca and Cattleya Anzac. Its bifoliate pseudobulbs are about 4" tall and grow along a horizontal rhizome. A terminal inflorescence is produced from a sheath at the tip of newly matured pseudobulbs. Ctt. Jewel Box averages 4.8 flowers per inflorescence and 9.2 cm (3.6 inches) natural spread. Flowers are slightly cupped, and vary from magenta to deep red, depending on growth conditions (light/temp) during bud development.

== Gallery ==
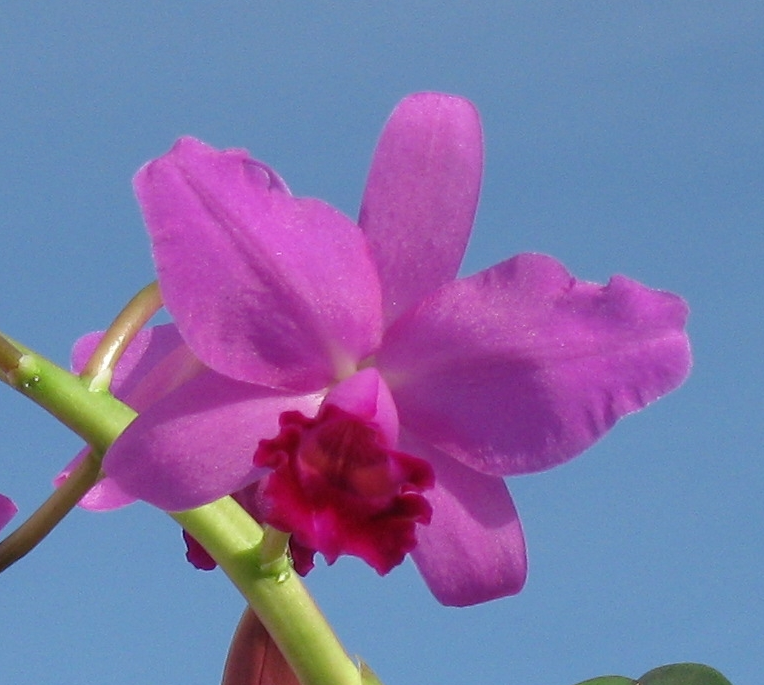
Ctt. Portia 'Gloriosa'
(= Gur. bowringiana × C. labiata) (Formerly C. Portia)

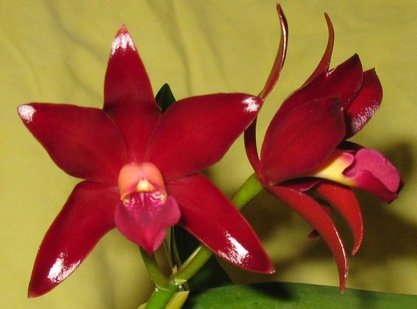
Ctt. Chocolate Drop 'Volcano Queen'
(= C. guttata × Gur. aurantiaca) (Formerly C. Chocolate Drop)

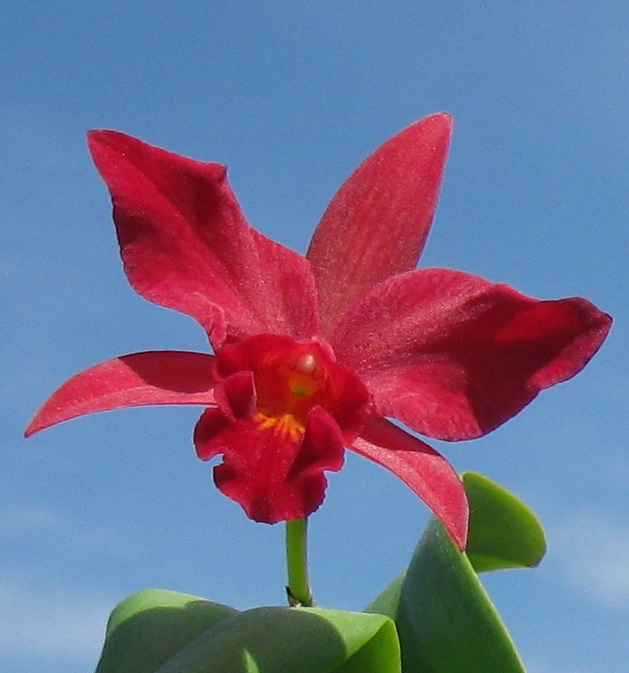
Ctt. Jewel Box 'Scheherazade'
(= Gur. aurantiaca × C. Anzac 'Orchidhurst')
Formerly Slc. Jewel Box, Ctt. Jewel Box is one parent of Ctt. Hazel Boyd.

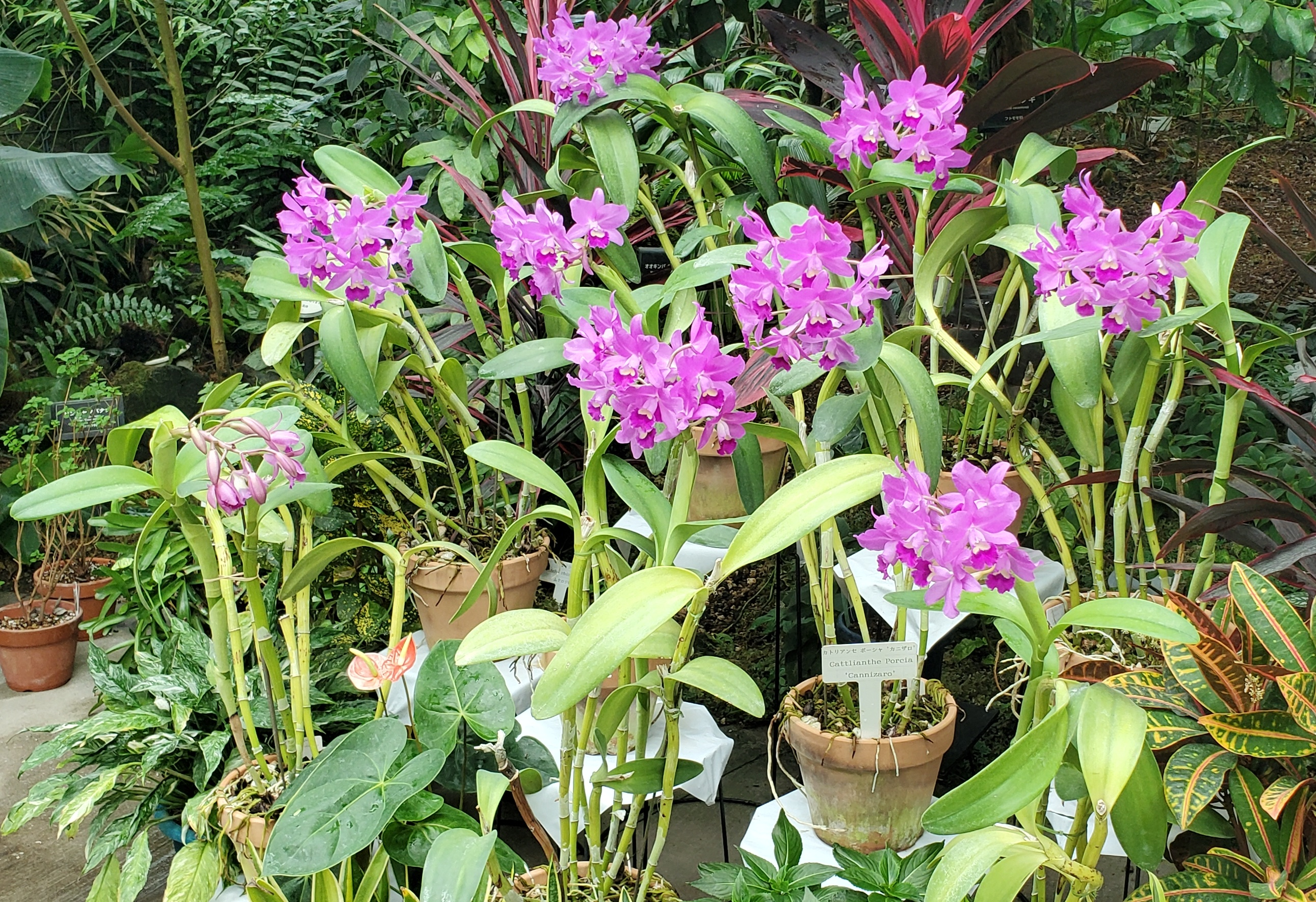
Cattlinathe Portia 'Cannizzaro '
A group of several Ctt. Portia plants flowering.
