= × Potinara =

Nothogenus of plants

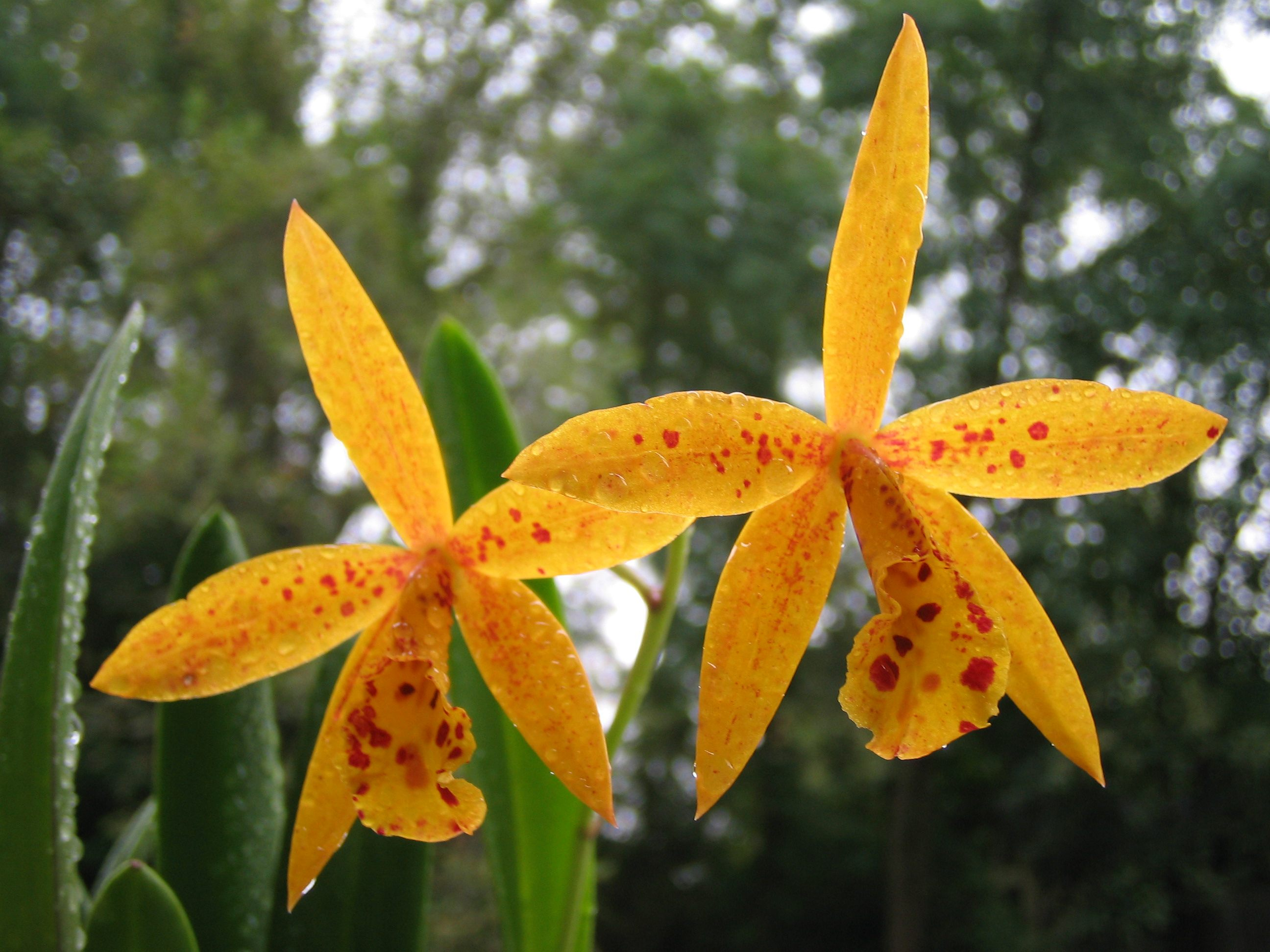
× Brassocattleya Hoku Gem, formerly placed in × Potinara

× Potinara, abbreviated Pot in the horticultural trade, was established as the nothogenus comprising those intergeneric hybrids of orchids which have Brassavola, Cattleya, Laelia and Sophronitis as parent genera. As of May 2026, Sophronitis was regarded as a synonym of Cattleya, so the parent genera are Brassavola × Cattleya × Laelia, for which the nothogenus is × Brassolaeliocattleya.

It can easily be imagined that a combination of all the desirable qualities of the parent genera would be an outstandingly handsome thing. However, plants in which all the desired qualities show up occur in only a small proportion of the offspring, and the percentage of plants homozygous for all qualities even less often. A rather extensive breeding program would be necessary to achieve the ideal results. Many lovely combinations do occur in × Potinara crosses, although relatively few have been made.

The search for a way to breed large red hybrids has been given a new boost with the discovery of Cattleya milleri. It is hoped that this species will not offer the genetic difficulties that have plagued hybridists using Sophronitis. Some encouraging results have already been achieved.

== Taxonomic history ==
In 2008, the genus Sophronitis was merged into Cattleya, making such nothogenera as × Potinara, × Sophrolaeliocattleya and × Sophrocattleya no longer current, but only of historical interest. At the same time, several species of Cattleya which had been widely used in hybridization were moved into the new genus Guarianthe. Two species of Brassavola, B. digbyana and B. glauca had also been moved into the new genus Rhyncholaelia earlier in the decade. As a result, greges which were once classified in × Potinara are now found in several genera and nothogenera.

== Footnotes ==
Media related to × Potinara at Wikimedia Commons
