= Lady of the Night =

Lady of the Night may refer to:

- A woman who engages in prostitution

== Plants ==
- Brassavola nodosa, a Mexican orchid
- Brassavola subulifolia, a Jamaican orchid
- Cestrum nocturnum, a Central American shrub
- Cereus hexagonus, a South American cactus

== Films ==
- Lady of the Night (1925 film), an American drama directed by Monta Bell
- Lady of the Pavements, a 1929 film released in the UK as Lady of the Night
- Lady of the Night (1986 film), an Italian film

== Music ==
- Lady of the Night (album), an album by Donna Summer
  - "Lady of the Night" (song), the title track
- "Lady of the Night", a song by Bucks Fizz from Bucks Fizz
- "The Lady of the Night", a 1973 song by David Houston
- "Lady of the Night", a song by LGT, featured in the Hungarian film A kenguru ("The Kangaroo") (1975)

== Other uses ==
- Lady of the Night, a title for Santa Muerte, a cult image, female deity, and folk saint in folk Catholicism and Mexican Neopaganism

== See also ==
- Night Lady, a 1964 album by John Griffin
