= × Sophrolaeliocattleya =

Genus of flowering plants

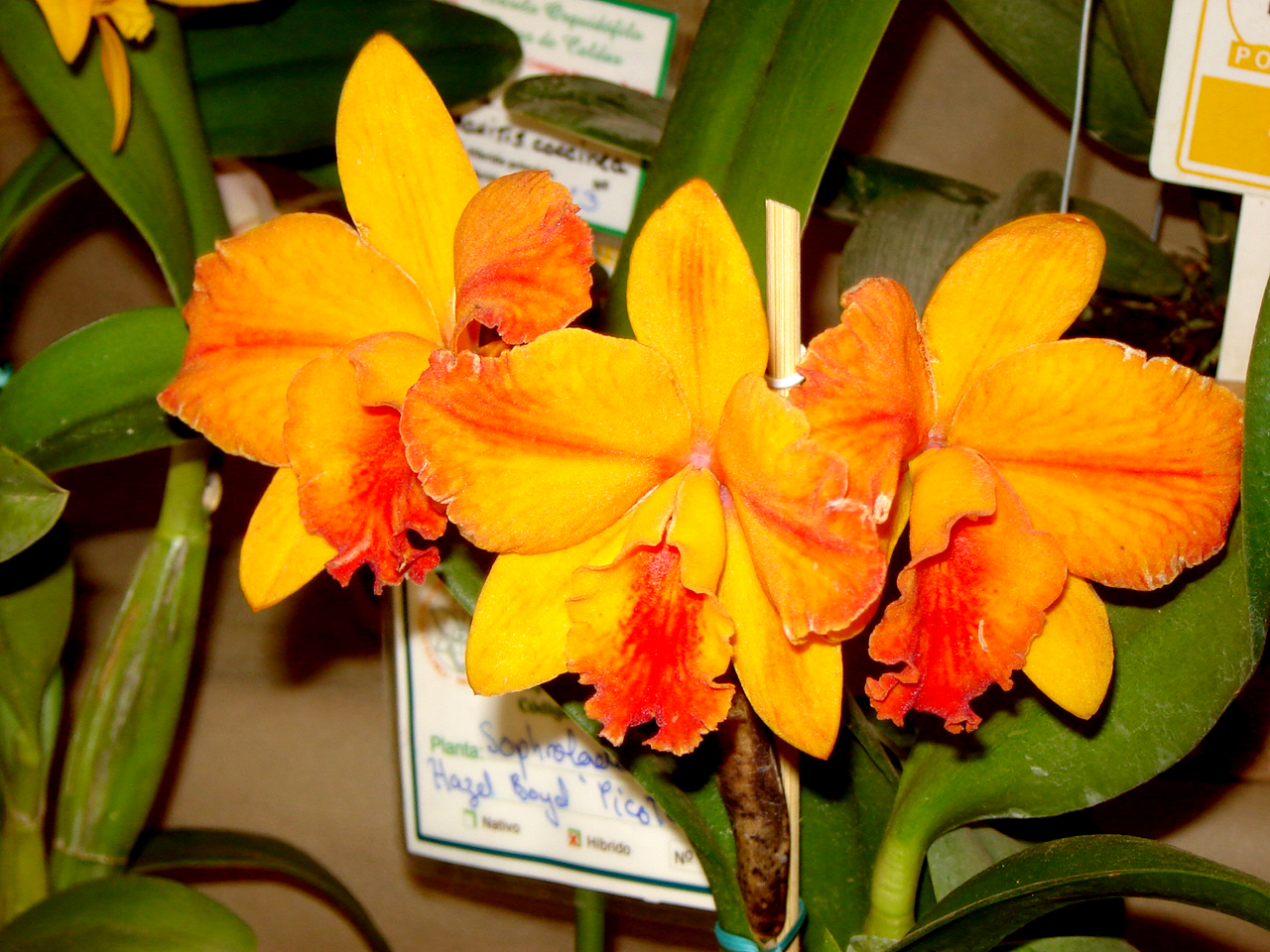
× Cattlianthe Hazel Boyd, formerly × Sophrolaeliocattleya Hazel Boyd

× Sophrolaeliocattleya (from Sophronitis, Laelia and Cattleya, its original parent genera), abbreviated as Slc. in the horticultural trade, was a nothogenus of artificial intergeneric orchid hybrids. As of 2008, the genus Sophronitis was merged into Cattleya, so that the genus × Sophrolaeliocattleya was defunct, many plants now belonging to × Laeliocattleya.

== Anatomy, morphology and habit ==
Plants formerly placed in × Sophrolaeliocattleya often show the influence of the former Sophronitis parent strongly; its flowers tend to range through yellow-orange to red, they tend to be smaller, and the general habit of the plant tends to be comparatively compact.

== Etymology and taxonomic history ==
This nothogeneric name was derived by putting together the then component genera: Sophronitis (combining form sophro-), Laelia (combining form laelio-) and Cattleya.

By 1999, the component genera had been rather stable (with the exception of the discovery of new species) for many decades. In 2000, many (if not most) of the species of Laelia which had been used in producing × Sophrolaeliocattleya hybrids were moved into the genus Sophronitis. As a result, many greges which had been in ×× Sophrolaeliocattleya were moved into the nothogenus × Sophrocattleya.

In 2008, the genus Sophronitis was merged into Cattleya, making both nothogenera × Sophrolaeliocattleya and × Sophrocattleya defunct. At the same time, several species of Cattleya which had been widely used in hybridization were moved into the new genus Guarianthe. As a result, greges which were once classified in × Sophrolaeliocattleya are now found in several genera and nothogenera, including × Laeliocattleya and × Cattlianthe:

| 1999 | 2009 | parentage (1999) | parentage (2009) |
| Slc. Anzac | C. Anzac (1921) | Slc. Marathon × Lc. Dominiana | C. Marathon × C. Dominiana (1899) |
| Slc. Jewel Box | Ctt. Jewel Box | C. aurantiaca × Slc. Anzac | Gur. aurantiaca × C. Anzac (1921) |
| Slc. An-An | Lc. An-An | L. anceps × Slc. Anzac | L. anceps × C. Anzac (1921) |
| Slc. Gadzooks | Lcn. Gadzooks | Slc. Hazel Boyd x L. Ancibarina | Ctt. Hazel Boyd x Lc. Ancibarina |

== Importance to humans ==
Hybrids involving the former genus Sophronitis commonly produce a desirable orange or red bloom not generally present in other Cattleya hybrids, and the compact shape is well suited for artificial light gardens.
