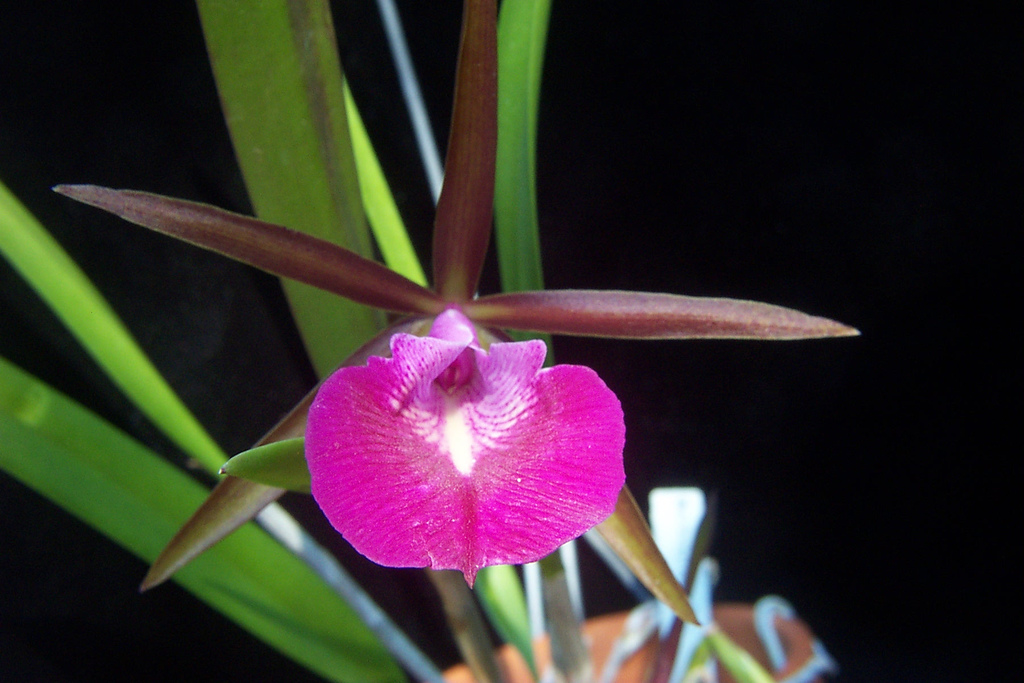
- Bc. Star Ruby = B. nodosa × C. batalinii

Scientific classification
- Kingdom: Plantae
- Clade: Tracheophytes
- Clade: Angiosperms
- Clade: Monocots
- Order: Asparagales
- Family: Orchidaceae
- Subfamily: Epidendroideae
- Tribe: Epidendreae
- Subtribe: Laeliinae
- Genus: × Brassocattleya; Rolfe

= × Brassocattleya =

Genus of flowering plants

× Brassocattleya or Brasso-cattleya, abbreviated Bc. in the horticultural trade, is an intergeneric orchid hybrid derived from the genera Brassavola and Cattleya. Brassocattleya contains both hybrids that appear in nature (in Brazil, see the species list below), as well as hybrids from cultivation (which are referred to by their grex names).

== Species ==
Species include:

- × Brassocattleya arauji Pabst & A.F.Mello
- × Brassocattleya felisminiana Campacci
- × Brassocattleya lindleyana Rolfe
- × Brassocattleya litoralis Campacci
- × Brassocattleya rubyi Braga
