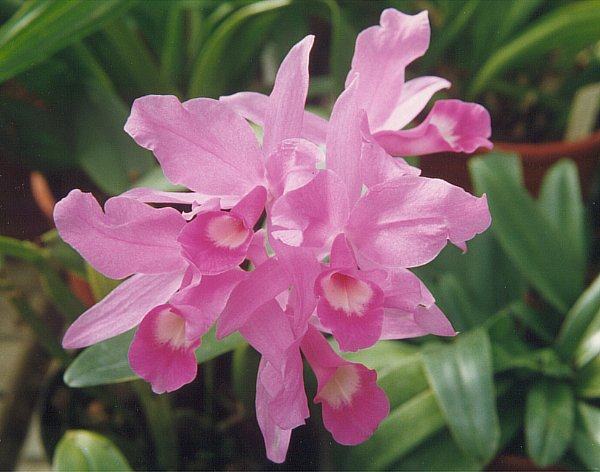

Scientific classification
- Kingdom: Plantae
- Clade: Tracheophytes
- Clade: Angiosperms
- Clade: Monocots
- Order: Asparagales
- Family: Orchidaceae
- Subfamily: Epidendroideae
- Genus: Guarianthe
- Species: G. skinneri

Binomial name
- Guarianthe skinneri (Bateman) Dressler & W. E. Higgins

Synonyms
- Cattleya skinneri Bateman; Cattleya laelioides Lem.; Cattleya deckeri Klotzsch; Epidendrum huegelianum Rchb.f.; Cattleya pachecoi Ames & Correll; Cattleya skinneri var. alba Rchb.f.; Cattleya skinneri f. alba (Rchb.f.) Schltr.; Guarianthe deckeri (Klotzsch) Roeth; Guarianthe skinneri f. alba (Rchb.f.) Christenson

= Guarianthe skinneri =

Species of orchid

Guarianthe skinneri (known as Guaria morada in Costa Rica) is a species of orchid. It is native to Costa Rica, from Chiapas to every country in Central America. Its range extends from the borders Southern Mexico to Costa Rica, a country in which it is the national flower.

It was referenced as Cattleya skinneri as the earlier name by James Bateman in 1839.
