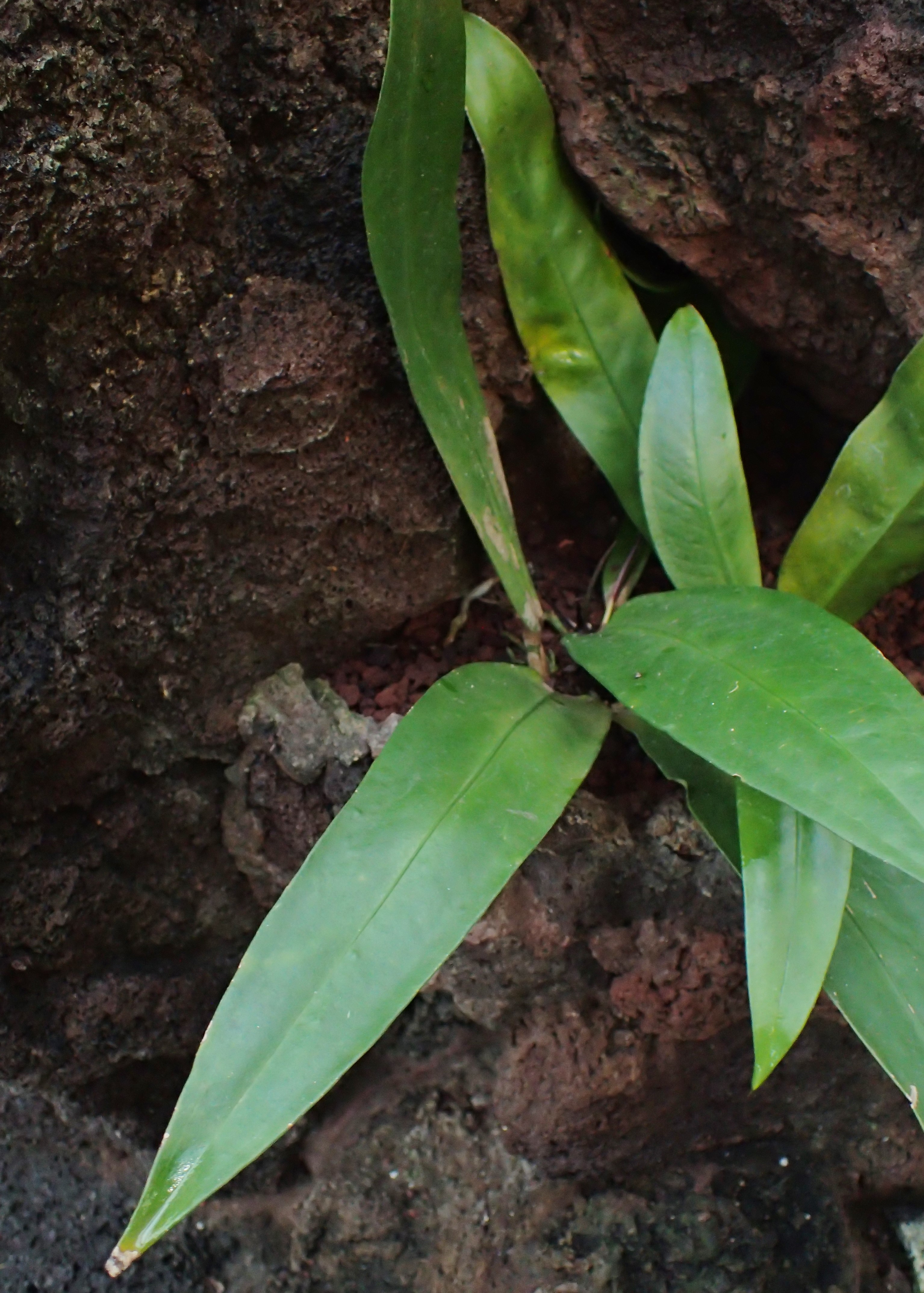
- Anthurium amnicola is often found in rocky, wet situations

Scientific classification
- Kingdom: Plantae
- Clade: Embryophytes
- Clade: Tracheophytes
- Clade: Angiosperms
- Clade: Monocots
- Order: Alismatales
- Family: Araceae
- Genus: Anthurium
- Species: A. amnicola

Binomial name
- Anthurium amnicola Dressler

Synonyms
- Anthurium lilacinum Dressler

= Anthurium amnicola =

Species of flowering plant

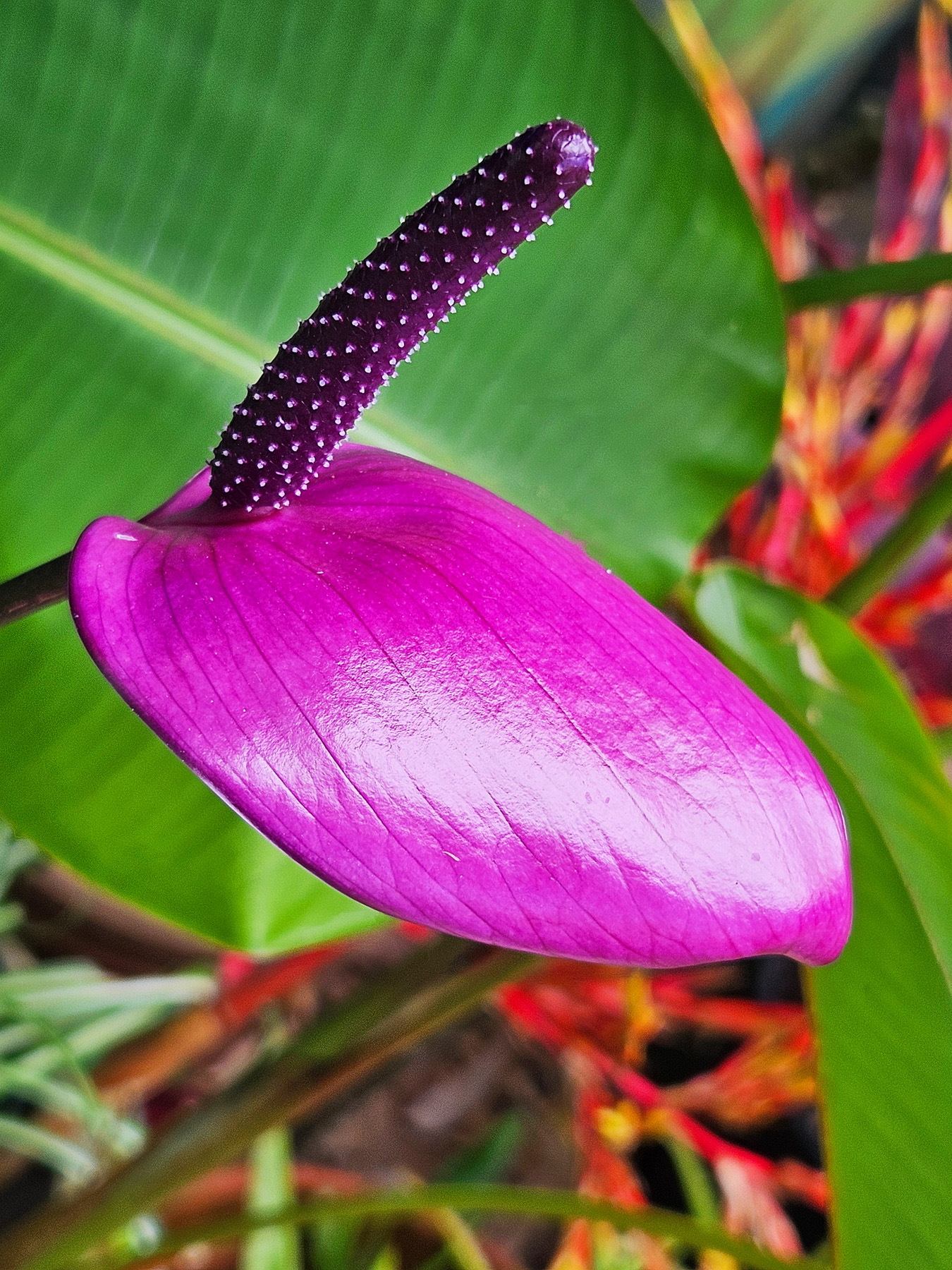
Anthurium amnicola Dressler, Hawaii

Anthurium amnicola (syn. Anthurium lilacinum), the tulip anthurium, tulip tailflower, or Hawaiian tulip, is a species of flowering plant in the family Araceae, native to Panama. With its tulip‑like flowers it was grown in Hawaii for the cut flower industry, and is occasionally sold today as a houseplant.
