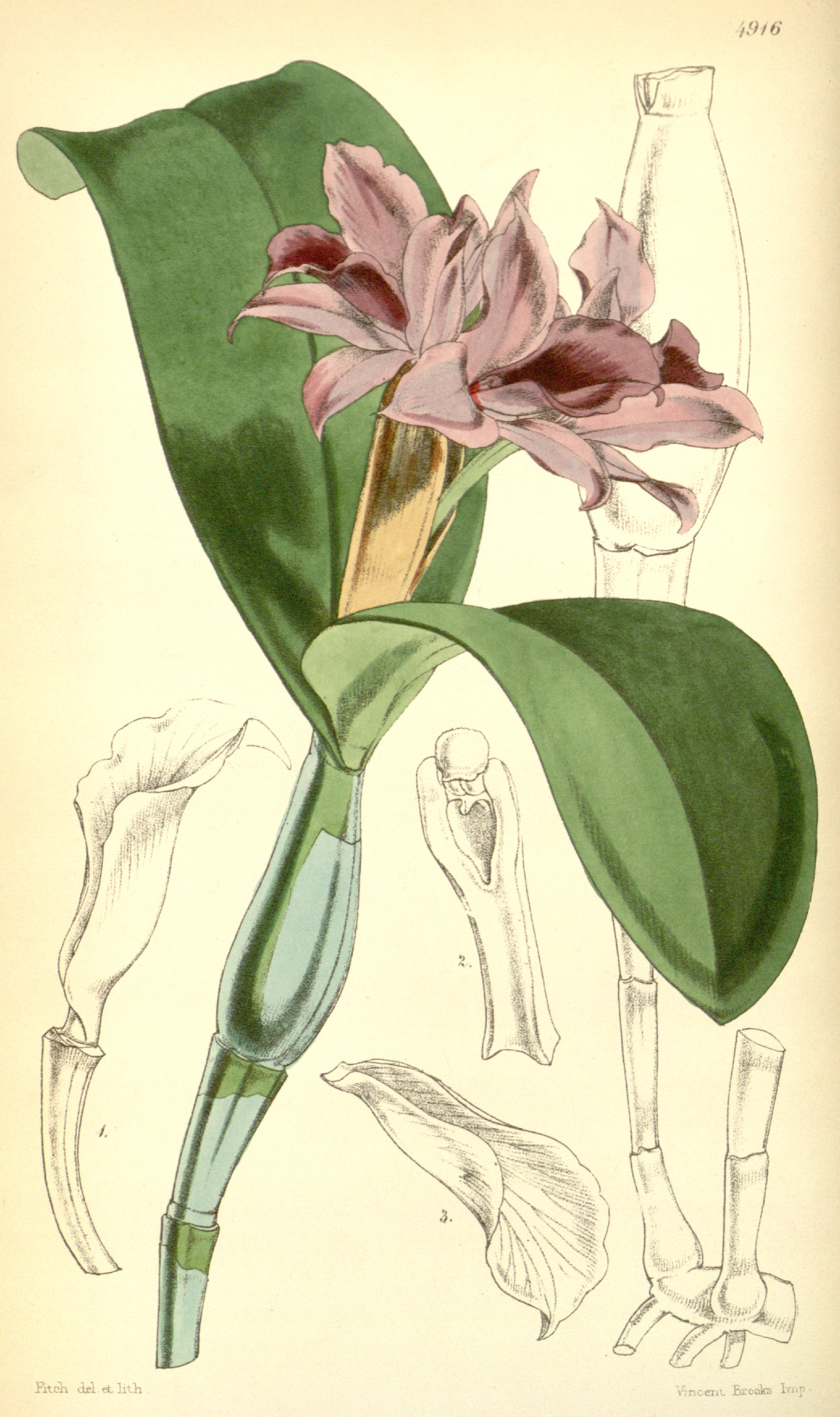

Scientific classification
- Kingdom: Plantae
- Clade: Tracheophytes
- Clade: Angiosperms
- Clade: Monocots
- Order: Asparagales
- Family: Orchidaceae
- Subfamily: Epidendroideae
- Genus: Guarianthe
- Species: G. patinii

Binomial name
- Guarianthe patinii (Cogn.) Dressler & W.E. Higgins

Synonyms
- Cattleya patinii Cogn. (basionym); Cattleya skinneri var patinii (Cogn.) Schltr.; Cattleya skinneri var parviflora Lindl.; Cattleya skinneri var autumnalis P.H.Allen ex L.O.Williams; Epidendrum huegelianum var parviflorum (Lindl.) Rchb.f.; Cattleya patinii var. alba Cogn. in C.A.Cogniaux & A.P.G.Goossens

= Guarianthe patinii =

Species of orchid

Guarianthe patinii is a species of orchid. It is native to Costa Rica, Panama, Colombia, Venezuela, and Trinidad; it is also reportedly naturalized in Ecuador.
