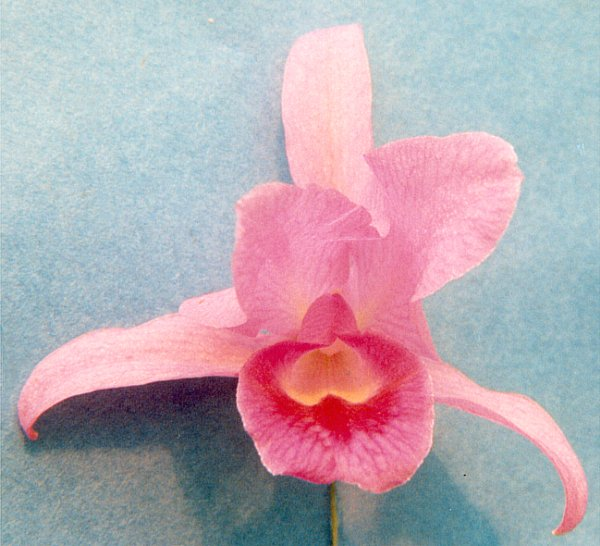

Scientific classification
- Kingdom: Plantae
- Clade: Tracheophytes
- Clade: Angiosperms
- Clade: Monocots
- Order: Asparagales
- Family: Orchidaceae
- Subfamily: Epidendroideae
- Genus: Guarianthe
- Species: G. bowringiana

Binomial name
- Guarianthe bowringiana (O'Brien) Dressler & W. E. Higgins

Synonyms
- Cattleya bowringiana O'Brien; Cattleya skinneri var. bowringiana (O'Brien) Rchb.f.; Cattleya autumnalis O'Brien

= Guarianthe bowringiana =

Species of orchid

Guarianthe bowringiana is a species of orchid. It is native to Mexico (Chiapas), Belize, Guatemala, and Honduras.
