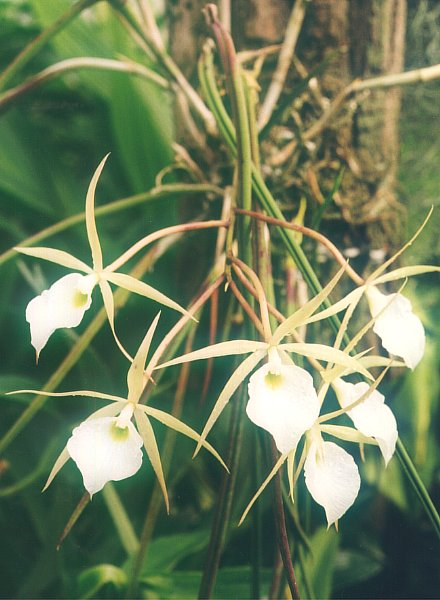

Scientific classification
- Kingdom: Plantae
- Clade: Tracheophytes
- Clade: Angiosperms
- Clade: Monocots
- Order: Asparagales
- Family: Orchidaceae
- Subfamily: Epidendroideae
- Genus: Brassavola
- Species: B. flagellaris

Binomial name
- Brassavola flagellaris Barb.Rodr.

= Brassavola flagellaris =

Species of orchid

Brassavola flagellaris is a species of epiphytic orchid of the Cattleya alliance. It grows wild in eastern Brazil (from Minas Gerais to Paraná), where it fills the evening air with the citrus-like fragrance of its blossoms.

== Etymology ==
The specific epithet, flagellaris, refers to the elongated (whip-like) leaves. In Brazil, the common name is munida de chicote, meaning "whip".

== Description ==
Brassavola flagellaris is a sympodial epiphyte (sometimes a lithophyte) with terete pseudobulbs, 6–30 cm long, each carrying a single elongated succulent leaf. The erect or pendulous inflorescence carries one to several flowers bearing long and narrow light-green sepals which closely resemble the lateral petals. The broad white lip closely encircles most of the light yellow-green column.

Members of this species grow readily under cultivation and are resistant to drought. They can be placed on slabs to allow their roots sufficient aeration.
