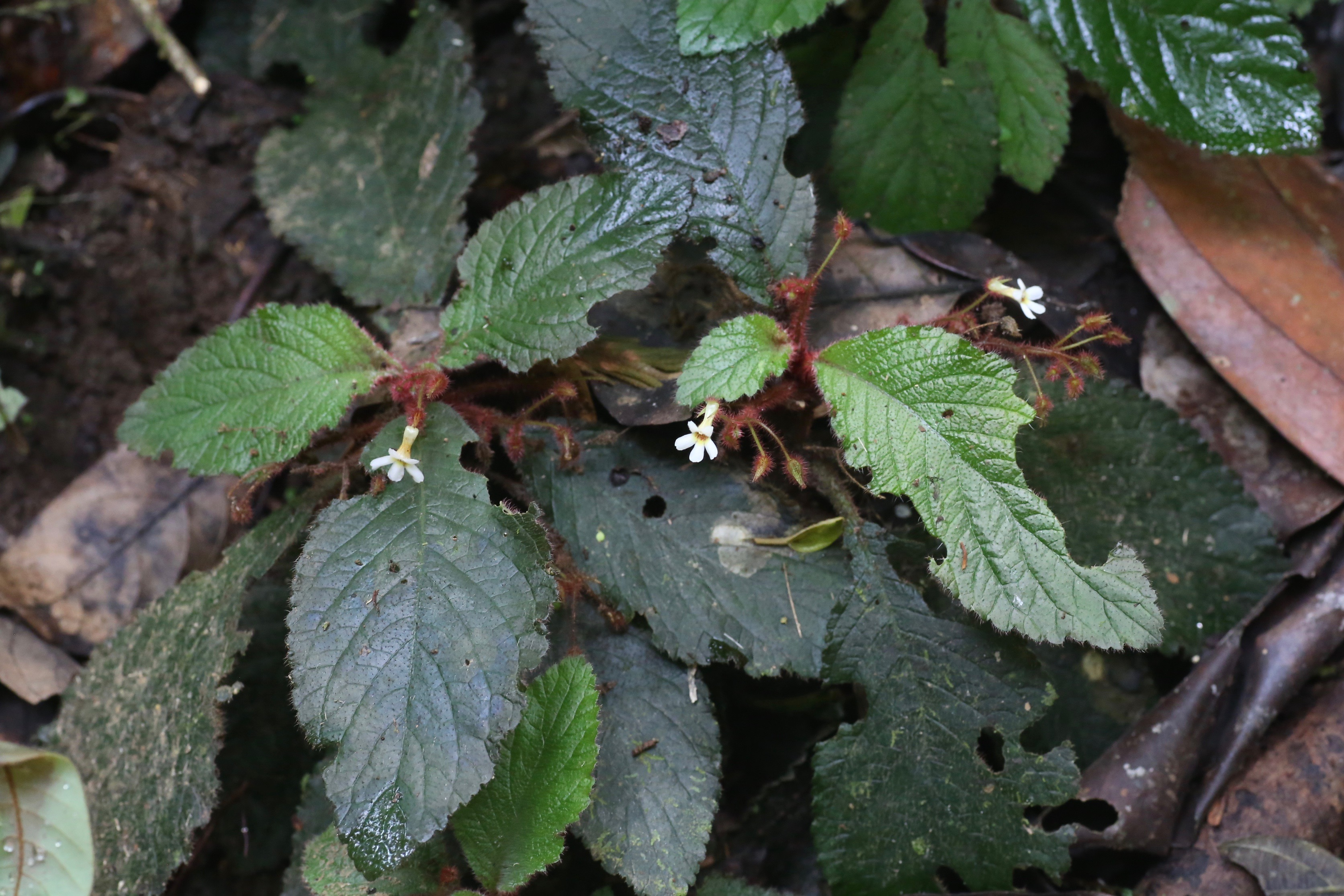
- Reldia multiflora in Napo Province, Ecuador

Conservation status
- Vulnerable (IUCN 3.1)

Scientific classification
- Kingdom: Plantae
- Clade: Tracheophytes
- Clade: Angiosperms
- Clade: Eudicots
- Clade: Asterids
- Order: Lamiales
- Family: Gesneriaceae
- Genus: Reldia
- Species: R. multiflora

Binomial name
- Reldia multiflora L.P.Kvist & L.E.Skog

= Reldia multiflora =

Species of flowering plant

Reldia multiflora is a species of plant in the family Gesneriaceae. It is endemic to Ecuador. Its natural habitat is subtropical or tropical moist lowland forests.
