= Grex (horticulture) =

Hybrids of orchids

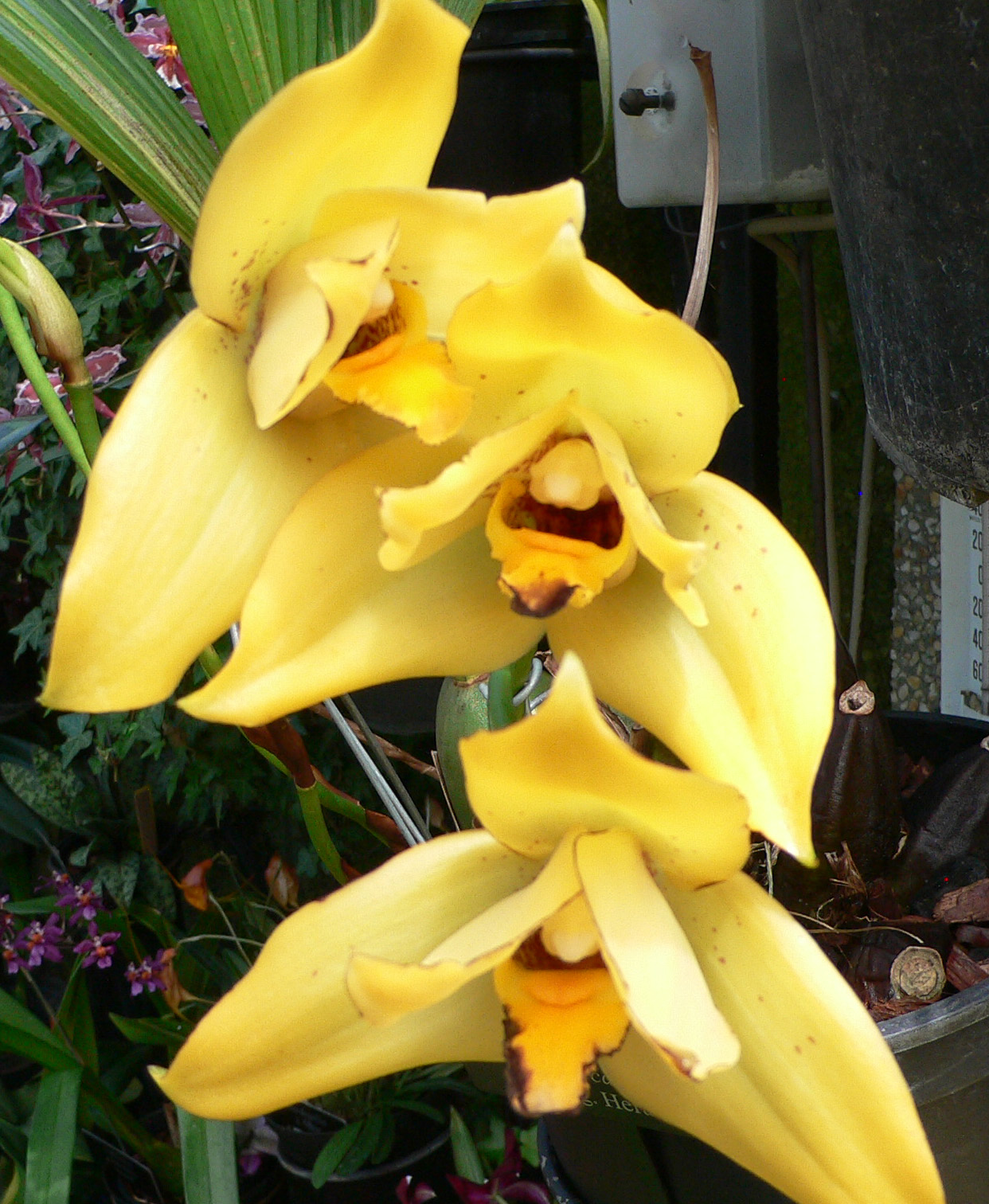
× Lycamerlycaste Hera gx is a grex of orchid hybrids in the nothogenus × Lycamerlycaste J.M.H.Shaw. It consists of hybrids between members of a grex (× Lycamerlycaste Brugensis gx) and a species (Lycaste cruenta Lindl.).

The term grex (plural greges or grexes; abbreviation gx), derived from the Latin noun grex, gregis, meaning 'flock', is used to describe hybrid plants.

- In the botanical nomenclature (ICNafp), grex is used to describe hybrids of orchids, based solely on their parentage.
- In the horticultural nomenclature (International Code of Nomenclature for Cultivated Plants), grex names are one of the three categories of plant names; within a grex the cultivar group category can be used to refer to plants by their shared characteristics (rather than by their parentage), and individual orchid plants can be selected (and propagated) and named as cultivars.

== Botanical nomenclature of hybrids ==
The horticultural nomenclature of grexes exists within the framework of the botanical nomenclature of hybrid plants. Interspecific hybrids occur in nature, and are treated under the International Code of Nomenclature for algae, fungi, and plants as nothospecies, ('notho' indicating hybrid). They can optionally be given Linnean binomials with a multiplication sign "×" before the species epithet for example Crataegus × media. An offspring of a nothospecies, either with a member of the same nothospecies or any of the parental species as the other parent, has the same nothospecific name. The nothospecific binomial is an alias for a list of the ancestral species, whether the ancestry is precisely known or not.

For example:

- a hybrid between Cattleya warscewiczii Rchb.f. 1854 and Cattleya aurea Linden 1883 can be called Cattleya × hardyana Sander 1883 or simply Cattleya hardyana. An offspring of a Cattleya × hardyana pollenized by another Cattleya × hardyana would also be called Cattleya × hardyana. Cattleya × hardyana would also be the name of an offspring of a Cattleya × hardyana pollenized by either a Cattleya warscewiczii or a Cattleya aurea, or an offspring of either a Cattleya warscewiczii or a Cattleya aurea pollenized by a Cattleya × hardyana.
- × Brassocattleya is a nothogenus including all hybrids between Brassavola and Cattleya. It includes the species Brassocattleya × arauji, also known simply as Brassocattleya arauji, which includes all hybrids between Brassavola tuberculata and Cattleya forbesii.

An earlier term was nothomorph for subordinate taxa to nothospecies. Since the 1982 meeting of the International Botanical Congress, such subordinate taxa are considered varieties (nothovars).

== Horticultural treatment ==
Because many interspecific (and even intergeneric) barriers to hybridization in the Orchidaceae are maintained in nature only by pollinator behavior, it is easy to produce complex interspecific and even intergeneric hybrid orchid seeds: all it takes is a human motivated to use a toothpick, and proper care of the mother plant as it develops a seed pod. Germinating the seeds and growing them to maturity is more difficult, however.

When a hybrid cross is made, all of the seedlings grown from the resulting seed pod are considered to be in the same grex. Any additional plants produced from the hybridization of the same two parents (members of the same species or grexes as the original parents) also belong to the grex. Reciprocal crosses are included within the same grex. If two members of the same grex produce offspring, the offspring receive the same grex name as the parents.

If a parent of a grex becomes a synonym, any grex names that were established by specifying the synonym are not necessarily discarded; the grex name that was published first is used (the principle of priority).

All of the members of a specific grex may be loosely thought of as "sister plants", and just like the brothers and sisters of any family, may share many traits or look quite different from one another. This is due to the randomization of genes passed on to progeny during sexual reproduction. The hybridizer who created a new grex normally chooses to register the grex with a registration authority, thus creating a new grex name, but there is no requirement to do this. Individual plants may be given cultivar names to distinguish them from siblings in their grex. Cultivar names are usually given to superior plants with the expectation of propagating that plant; all genetically identical copies of a plant, regardless of method of propagation (divisions or clones) share a cultivar name.

== Naming ==
Two named cultivars from the same grex

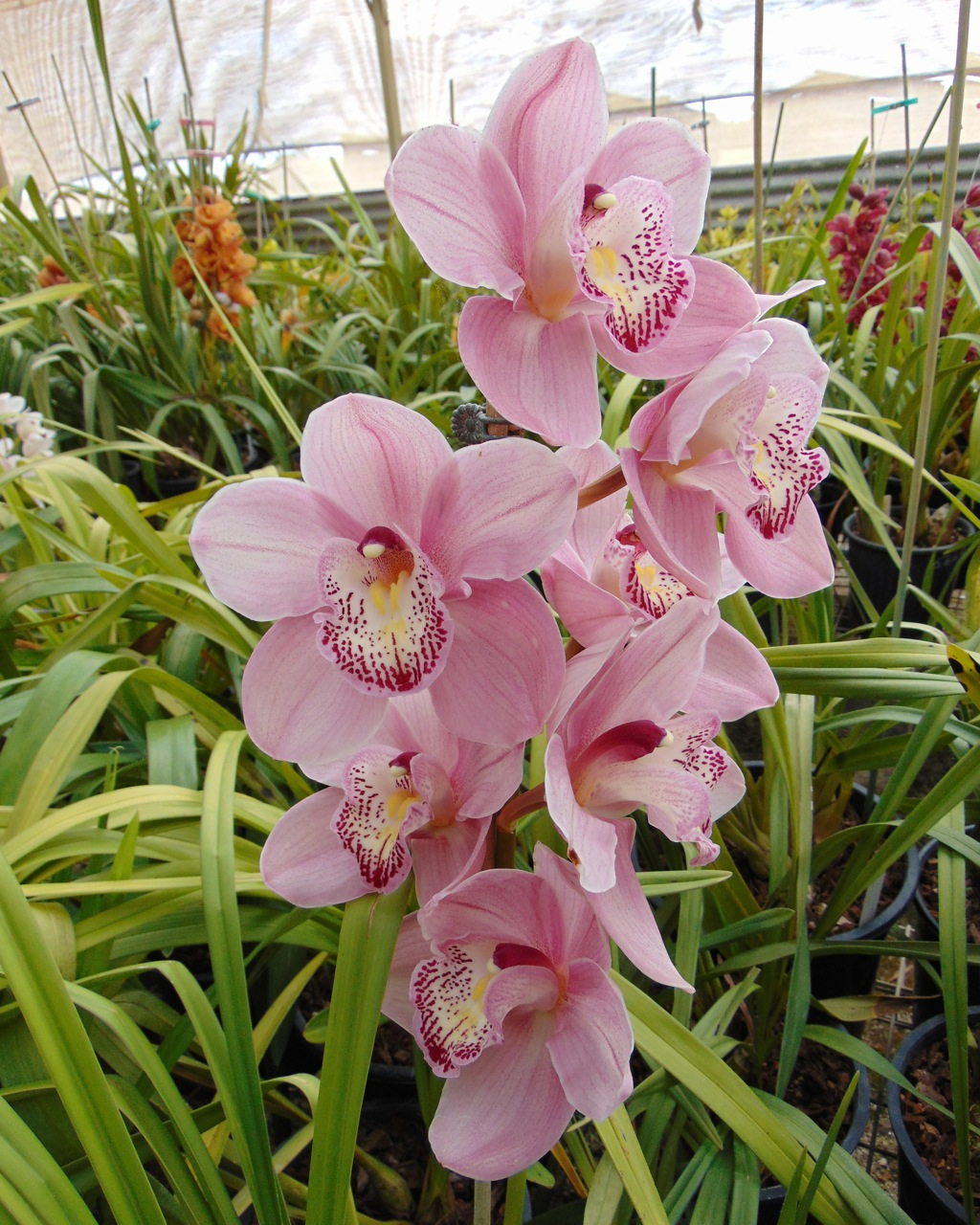
Cymbidium Kirby Lesh 'Pink Ice'

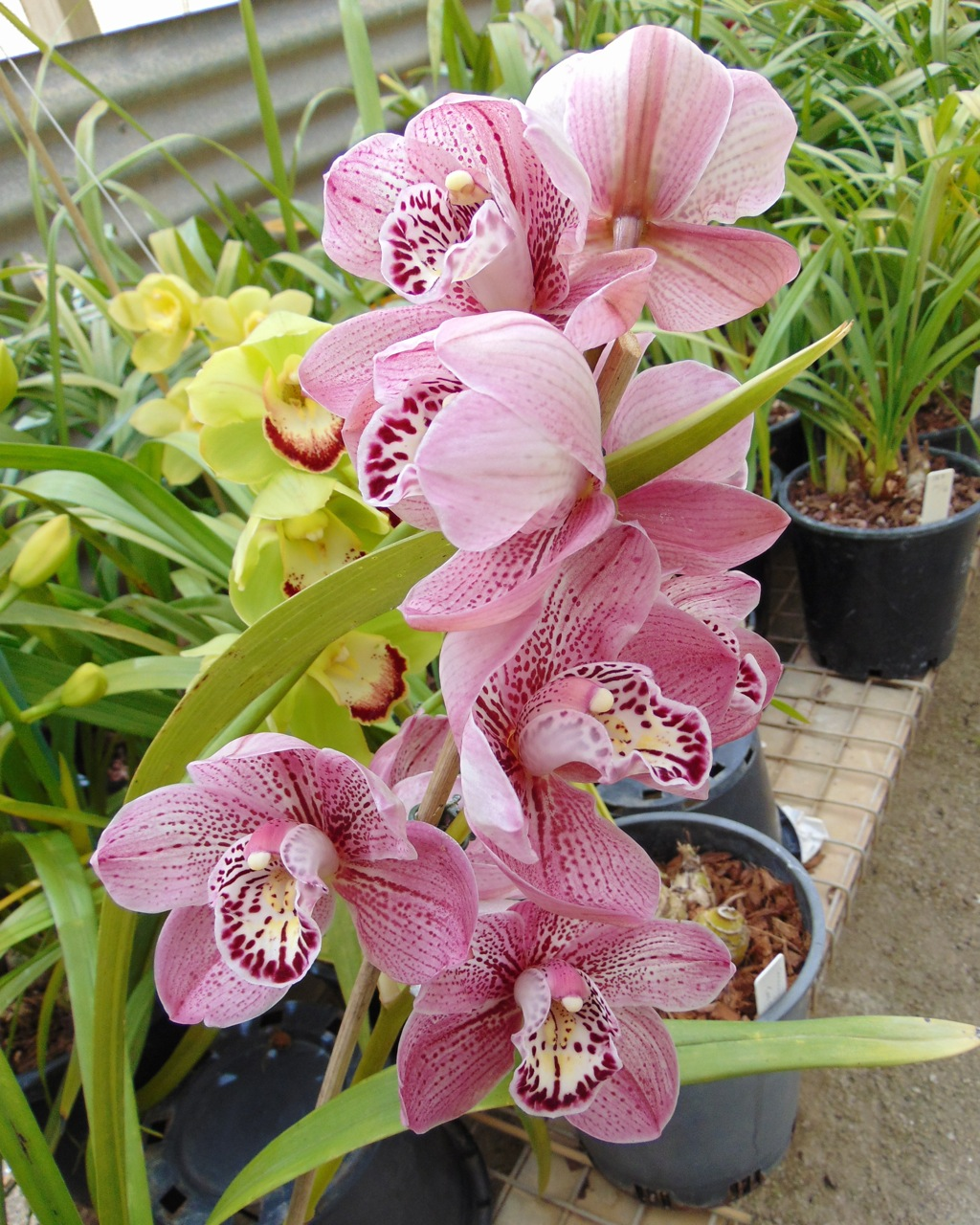
Cymbidium Kirby Lesh 'Lonsdale'

The rules for the naming of greges are defined by the International Code of Nomenclature for Cultivated Plants (ICNCP). The grex name differs from a species name in that the gregaric part of the name is capitalized, is not italicized, and may consist of more than one word (limited to 30 characters in total, excluding spaces). Furthermore, names of greges are to be in a living language rather than Latin.

For example: an artificially produced hybrid between Cattleya warscewiczii and C. dowiana (or C. aurea, which the RHS, the international orchid hybrid registration authority, considers to be a synonym of C. dowiana) is called C. Hardyana (1896) gx. An artificially produced seedling that results from pollinating a C. Hardyana (1896) gx with another C. Hardyana (1896) gx is also a C. Hardyana (1896) gx. However, the hybrid produced between Cattleya Hardyana (1896) gx and C. dowiana is not C. Hardyana (1896) gx, but C. Prince John gx. In summary:

- C. warscewiczii × C. dowiana → C. Hardyana (1896) gx
- C. Hardyana (1896) gx × C. warscewiczii → C. Eleanor (1918) gx
- C. dowiana × C. Hardyana (1896) gx → C. Prince John gx

== Registration ==
When the name of a grex is first established, a description is required that specifies two particular parents, where each parent is specified either as a species (or nothospecies) or as a grex. The grex name then applies to all hybrids between those two parents. There is a permitted exception if the full name of one of the parents is known but the other is known only to genus level or nothogenus level.

New grex names are now established by the Royal Horticultural Society, which receives applications from orchid hybridizers.

== Relationship with nothospecies ==
The concept of grex and nothospecies are similar, but not equivalent. While greges are only used within the orchid family, nothospecies are used for any plant (including orchids).

Furthermore, a grex and nothospecies differ in that a grex and a nothospecies can have the same parentage, but are not equivalent because the nothospecies includes back-crosses and the grex does not. They can even have the same epithet, distinguished by typography (see botanical name for explanation of epithets), although since January 2010 it is not permitted to publish such grex names if the nothospecies name already exists.

Hybrids between a grex and a species/nothospecies are named as greges, but this is not permitted if the nothospecies parent has the same parentage as the grex parent. That situation is a back-cross, and the nothospecies name is applied to the progeny.

== Bibliography ==
- Brickell, C.D.; Alexander, C.; David, J.C.; Hetterscheid, W.L.A.; Leslie, A.C.; Malecot, V.; Jin, X.; Cubey, J.J. (2009), International Code of Nomenclature for Cultivated Plants (ICNCP or Cultivated Plant Code) incorporating the Rules and Recommendations for naming plants in cultivation, Eighth Edition, Adopted by the International Union of Biological Sciences International Commission for the Nomenclature of Cultivated Plants (PDF), International Association for Plant Taxonomy and International Society for Horticultural Science, ISBN 978-90-6605-662-6
- McNeill, J.; Barrie, F.R.; Buck, W.R.; Demoulin, V.; Greuter, W.; Hawksworth, D.L.; Herendeen, P.S.; Knapp, S.; Marhold, K.; Prado, J.; Prud'homme Van Reine, W.F.; Smith, G.F.; Wiersema, J.H.; Turland, N.J. (2012), International Code of Nomenclature for algae, fungi, and plants (Melbourne Code) adopted by the Eighteenth International Botanical Congress Melbourne, Australia, July 2011, vol. Regnum Vegetabile 154, A.R.G. Gantner Verlag KG, ISBN 978-3-87429-425-6
- RHS (2016). "Search The International Orchid Register". Royal Horticultural Society.
