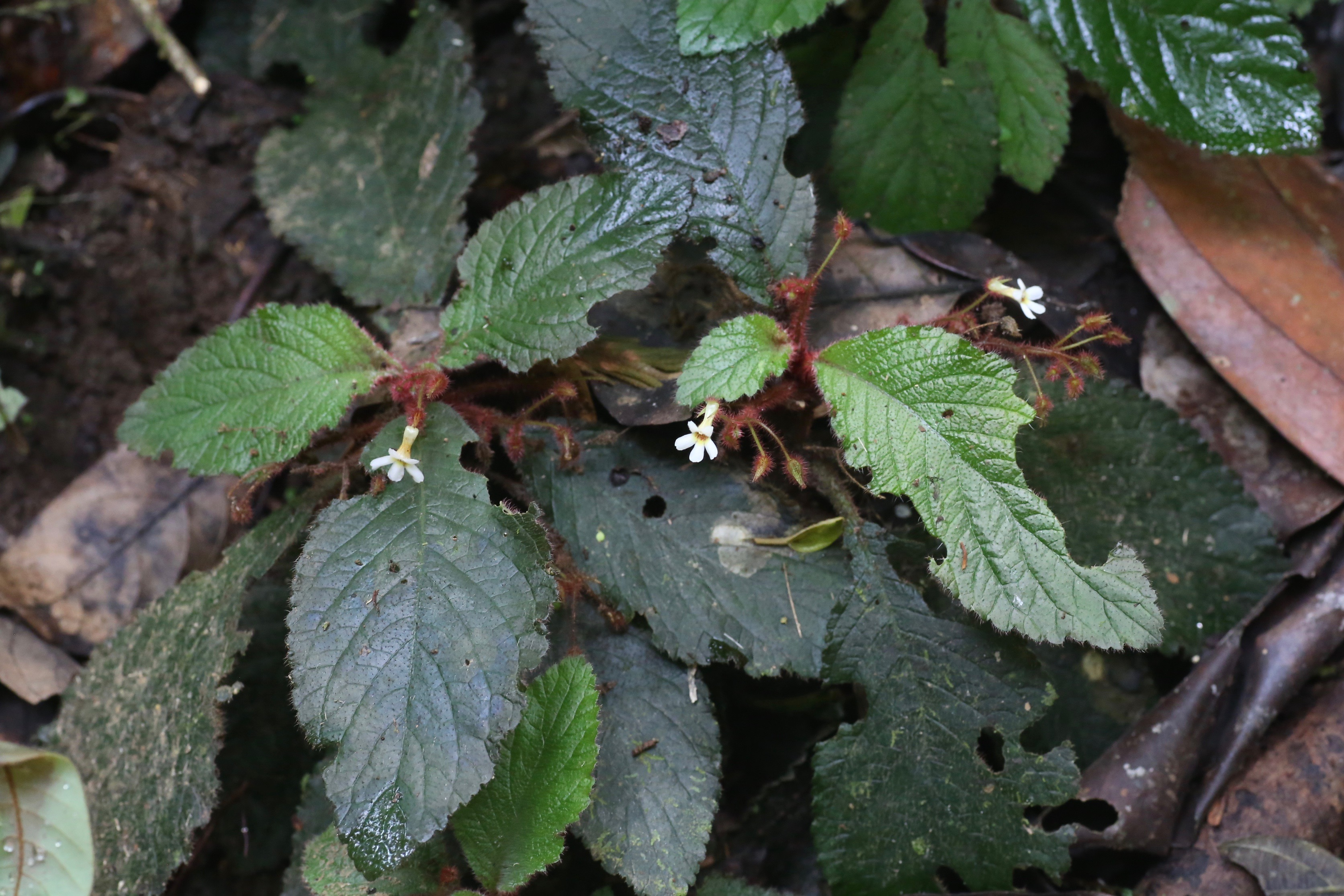
- Reldia multiflora

Scientific classification
- Kingdom: Plantae
- Clade: Tracheophytes
- Clade: Angiosperms
- Clade: Eudicots
- Clade: Asterids
- Order: Lamiales
- Family: Gesneriaceae
- Genus: Reldia; Wiehler

Species
- See text

= Reldia =

Genus of flowering plants

Reldia is a genus of plants in the family Gesneriaceae. They are also in the Beslerieae tribe.

They are native to Colombia, Costa Rica, Ecuador, Panamá and Peru in South America.

It contains the following species, according to Plants of the World Online;

- Reldia alternifolia Wiehler
- Reldia calcarata L.P.Kvist & L.E.Skog
- Reldia grandiflora L.P. Kvist & L.E. Skog
- Reldia longipedunculata J.L.Clark
- Reldia minutiflora (L.E. Skog) L.P. Kvist & L.E. Skog
- Reldia multiflora L.P.Kvist & L.E.Skog

The genus name of Reldia is in honour of Robert Louis Dressler (born 1927), an American botanist specialist of the taxonomy of the Orchidaceae family. It was first described and published in Selbyana Vol.2 on page 124 in 1977.

The genus is recognized by the United States Department of Agriculture and the Agricultural Research Service, but they do not list any known species.
