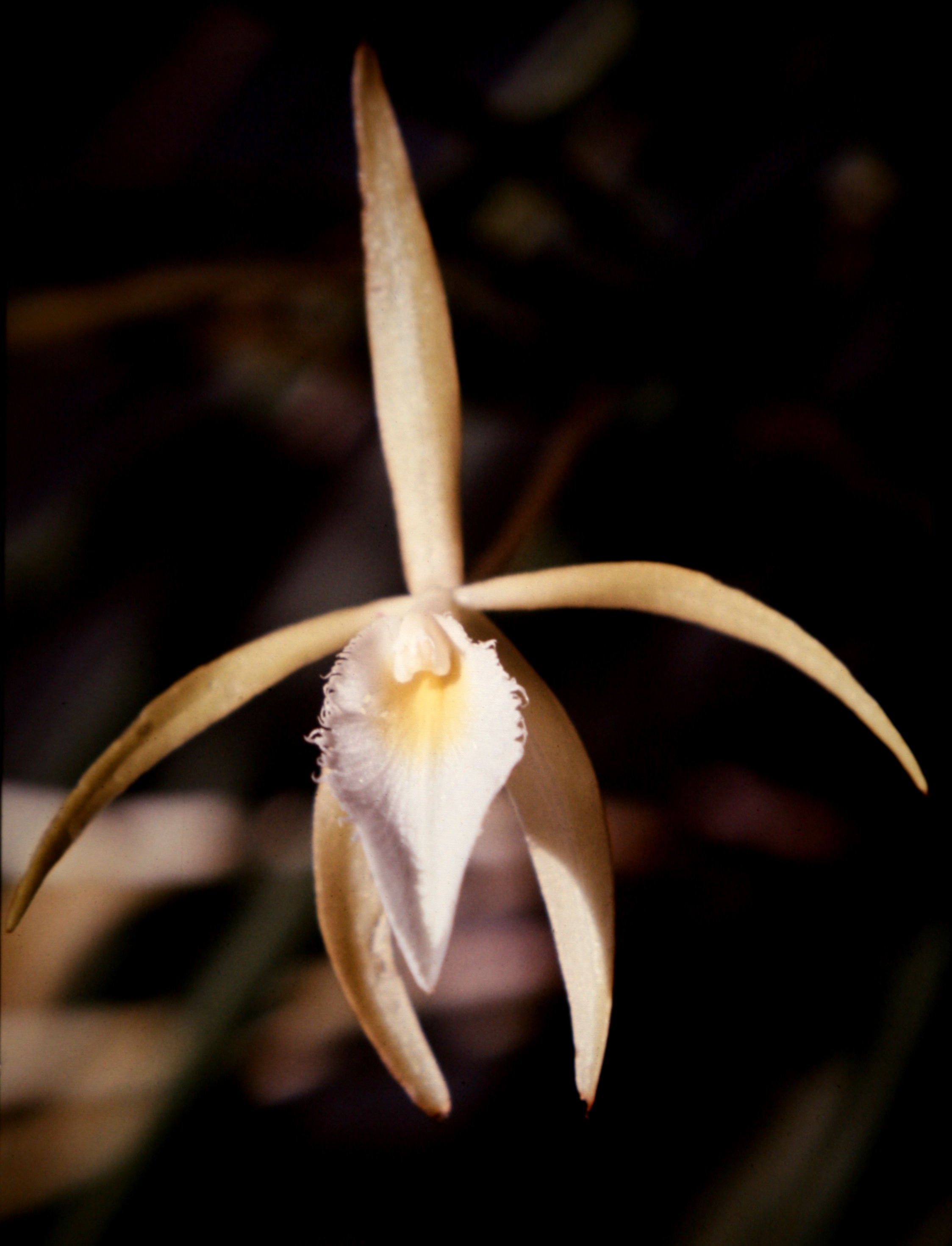

Scientific classification
- Kingdom: Plantae
- Clade: Tracheophytes
- Clade: Angiosperms
- Clade: Monocots
- Order: Asparagales
- Family: Orchidaceae
- Subfamily: Epidendroideae
- Genus: Brassavola
- Species: B. martiana

Binomial name
- Brassavola martiana Lindl.

Synonyms
- Brassavola duckeana Horta; Brassavola amazonica Poepp. & Endl.; Bletia amazonica (Poepp. & Endl.) Rchb.f.; Bletia martiana (Lindl.) Rchb.f.; Bletia attenuata Rchb.f.; Brassavola multiflora Schltr.; Brassavola martiana var. multiflora (Schltr.) H.G. Jones

= Brassavola martiana =

Species of orchid

Brassavola martiana is a species of orchid found in South Tropical America. It is reported from Brazil, Peru, Colombia, Venezuela, French Guiana, Guyana and Suriname.
