= Brassavola angustata =

Scientific classification
- Kingdom: Plantae
- Clade: Tracheophytes
- Clade: Angiosperms
- Clade: Monocots
- Order: Asparagales
- Family: Orchidaceae
- Subfamily: Epidendroideae
- Genus: Brassavola
- Species: B. angustata

Binomial name
- Brassavola angustata Lindl.

Synonyms
- Bletia angustata (Lindl.) Rchb.f. in W.G.Walpers; Brassavola surinamensis Focke; Bletia attenuata Rchb.f.

Species of orchid

Brassavola angustata is a species of orchid native to Trinidad and Tobago, Guyana, Venezuela, Suriname, and Roraima. In Henry G. Jones' revision of Brassavola, he placed it in B. sect. Sessilabia.
