= Orchinol =

Names
- Preferred IUPAC name 5,7-Dimethoxy-9,10-dihydrophenanthren-2-ol
- Other names 9,10-Dihydro-5,7-dimethoxyphenanthren-2-ol

Identifiers
CAS Number	41060-20-2
3D model (JSmol)	Interactive image
ChemSpider	158032
PubChem CID	181686
UNII	V897GN013Q
CompTox Dashboard (EPA)	DTXSID90961419
- InChI: InChI=1S/C16H16O3/c1-18-13-8-11-4-3-10-7-12(17)5-6-14(10)16(11)15(9-13)19-2/h5-9,17H,3-4H2,1-2H3 Key: HOVUVTNDNLNINP-UHFFFAOYSA-N; InChI=1/C16H16O3/c1-18-13-8-11-4-3-10-7-12(17)5-6-14(10)16(11)15(9-13)19-2/h5-9,17H,3-4H2,1-2H3 Key: HOVUVTNDNLNINP-UHFFFAOYAM
- SMILES: COC1=CC(=C2C(=C1)CCC3=C2C=CC(=C3)O)OC

Properties
Chemical formula	C_{16}H_{16}O_{3}
Molar mass	256.301 g·mol^{−1}
- Except where otherwise noted, data are given for materials in their standard state (at 25 °C [77 °F], 100 kPa). Infobox references

Orchinol is a 9,10-dihydrophenanthrene, a type of phenanthrenoid. It can be isolated from infected Orchis militaris and infected Loroglossum hircinum with Rhizoctonia repens. This molecule has a phytoalexin effect. It reduces the growth of Cattleya aurantiaca seedlings and has an antifungal activity.
