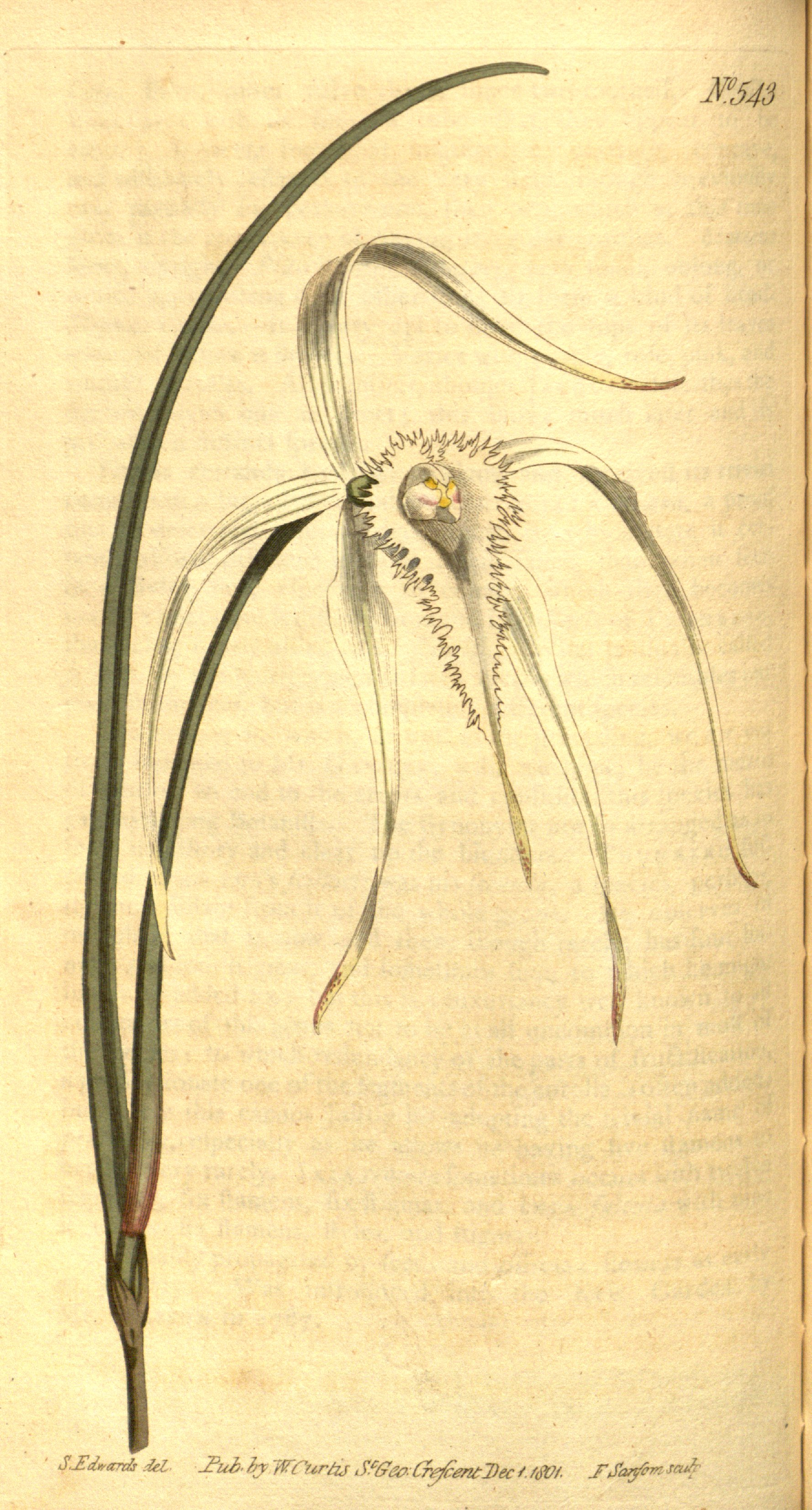
- 1829 illustration from Curtis's botanical magazine

Scientific classification
- Kingdom: Plantae
- Clade: Tracheophytes
- Clade: Angiosperms
- Clade: Monocots
- Order: Asparagales
- Family: Orchidaceae
- Subfamily: Epidendroideae
- Genus: Brassavola
- Species: B. cucullata

Binomial name
- Brassavola cucullata (L.) R. Br. (1813)

Synonyms
- Epidendrum cucullatum L. (1763) (Basionym); Cymbidium cucullatum (L.) Sw. (1799); Brassavola cuspidata Hook. (1839); Brassavola appendiculata A. Rich. & Galeotti (1845); Brassavola odoratissima Regel (1852); Bletia cucullata (L.) Rchb.f. (1862); Bletia cucullata var. cuspidata (Hook.) Rchb.f. (1862); Brassavola cucullata var. elegans Schltr. (1919)

= Brassavola cucullata =

Daddy long-legs orchid

Species of orchid

Brassavola cucullata, common name daddy long-legs orchid, is a species of orchid native to Mexico (from Sinaloa and San Luis Potosí south to Chiapas and the Yucatán Peninsula), Belize, Central America, the West Indies and northern South America (Colombia, Venezuela, Guyana, Suriname, French Guinea).

Brassavola cucullatais the type species for the genus Brassavola, and the only member of B. sect. Brassavola. The diploid chromosome number of B. cucullata has been determined as 2n = 40.
