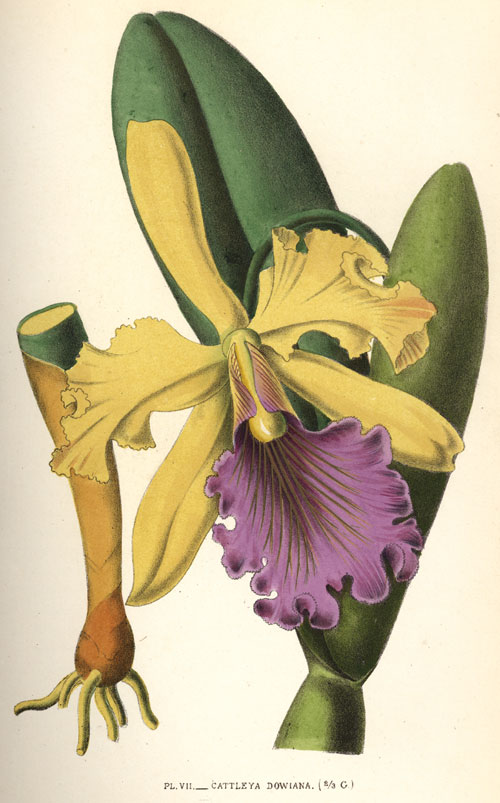

Scientific classification
- Kingdom: Plantae
- Clade: Tracheophytes
- Clade: Angiosperms
- Clade: Monocots
- Order: Asparagales
- Family: Orchidaceae
- Subfamily: Epidendroideae
- Genus: Cattleya
- Subgenus: Cattleya subg. Cattleya
- Section: Cattleya sect. Cattleya
- Species: C. dowiana

Binomial name
- Cattleya dowiana Bateman & Rchb.f.

Synonyms
- Cattleya aurea Linden; Cattleya chrysotaxa (Sander) God.-Leb.; Cattleya labiata var. dowiana (Bateman & Rchb.f.) A.H.Kent

= Cattleya dowiana =

Species of orchid

Cattleya dowiana is a species of orchid. The diploid chromosome number of C. dowiana has been determined as 2n = 40; the haploid chromosome number has been determined as n = 20.
