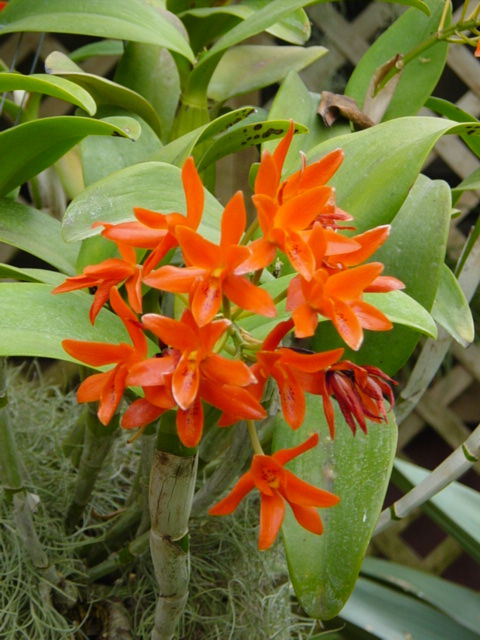

Scientific classification
- Kingdom: Plantae
- Clade: Tracheophytes
- Clade: Angiosperms
- Clade: Monocots
- Order: Asparagales
- Family: Orchidaceae
- Subfamily: Epidendroideae
- Genus: Guarianthe
- Species: G. aurantiaca

Binomial name
- Guarianthe aurantiaca (Bateman ex Lindl.) Dressler & W.E. Higgins

Synonyms
- Amalia aurantiaca (Bateman ex Lindl.) Heynh; Epidendrum aurantiacum Bateman ex Lindl. (basionym); Cattleya aurantiaca (Bateman ex Lindl.) P.N. Don; Laelia aurantiaca (Bateman ex Lindl.) Beer; Broughtonia aurea Lindl.; Epidendrum aureum (Lindl.) Lindl.

= Guarianthe aurantiaca =

Species of orchid

Guarianthe aurantiaca is a species of orchid. It is widespread across much of Mexico, south to Costa Rica. The diploid chromosome number of G. aurantiaca has been determined as 2n = 40.

The phananthrenoids orchinol and loroglossol have a phytoalexin effect and reduce the growth of G. aurantiaca seedlings.
