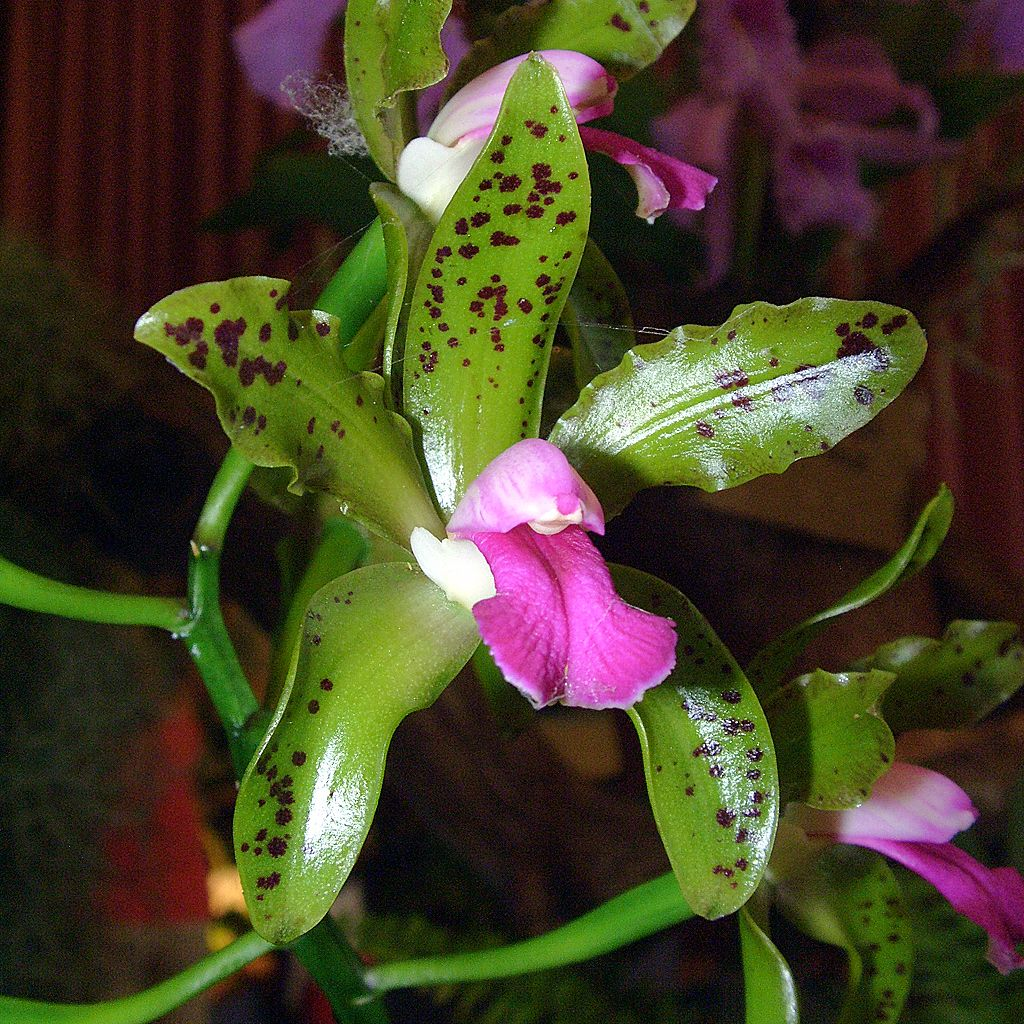

Scientific classification
- Kingdom: Plantae
- Clade: Tracheophytes
- Clade: Angiosperms
- Clade: Monocots
- Order: Asparagales
- Family: Orchidaceae
- Subfamily: Epidendroideae
- Genus: Cattleya
- Subgenus: Cattleya subg. Intermediae
- Species: C. guttata

Binomial name
- Cattleya guttata Lindl.

Synonyms
- Cattleya elatior Lindl.; Cattleya sphenophora C. Morren; Epidendrum amethystoglossum Rchb.f.; Epidendrum elatius (Lindl.) Rchb.f.; Cattleya guttata var. pernambucensis Rodigas; Cattleya guttata var. compacta Hoehne & Schltr.; Cattleya guttata var. elatior (Lindl.) Fowlie; Cattleya guttata var. caerulea L.C. Menezes; Cattleya leopoldii subsp. pernambucensis Brieger; Cattleya guttata f. munda (Rchb.f.) M.Wolff & O.Gruss; Cattleya guttata f. albina Xim.Bols.

= Cattleya guttata =

Species of orchid

Cattleya guttata ("the spotted Cattley orchid") is a bifoliate Cattleya species of orchid. The diploid chromosome number of C. guttata has been determined as 2n = 40.
