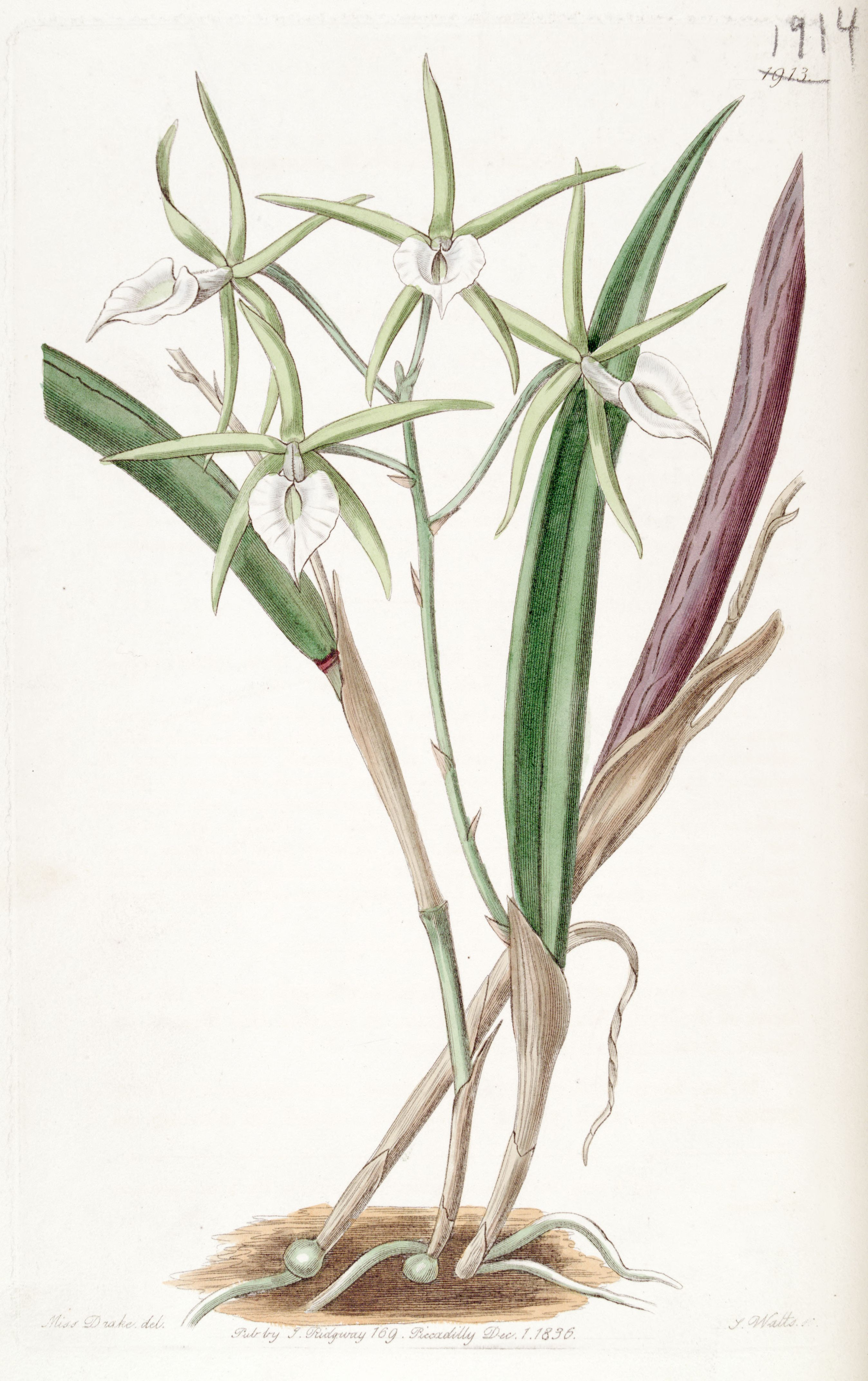
- 1836 illustration by Sarah Drake in Edwards's Botanical Register

Conservation status
- Least Concern (IUCN 3.1)
- CITES Appendix II

Scientific classification
- Kingdom: Plantae
- Clade: Tracheophytes
- Clade: Angiosperms
- Clade: Monocots
- Order: Asparagales
- Family: Orchidaceae
- Subfamily: Epidendroideae
- Genus: Brassavola
- Species: B. subulifolia

Binomial name
- Brassavola subulifolia Lindl.

Synonyms
- Brassavola nodosa Hook.; Brassavola cordata Lindl.; Lysimnia bicolor Raf.; Bletia cordata (Lindl.) Rchb.f.; Bletia nodosa var. cordata (Lindl.) Rchb.f.; Brassavola sloanei Griseb.; Brassavola stricta T.Moore & Mast.

= Brassavola subulifolia =

Species of orchid

Brassavola subulifolia is a species of orchid endemic to Jamaica.
