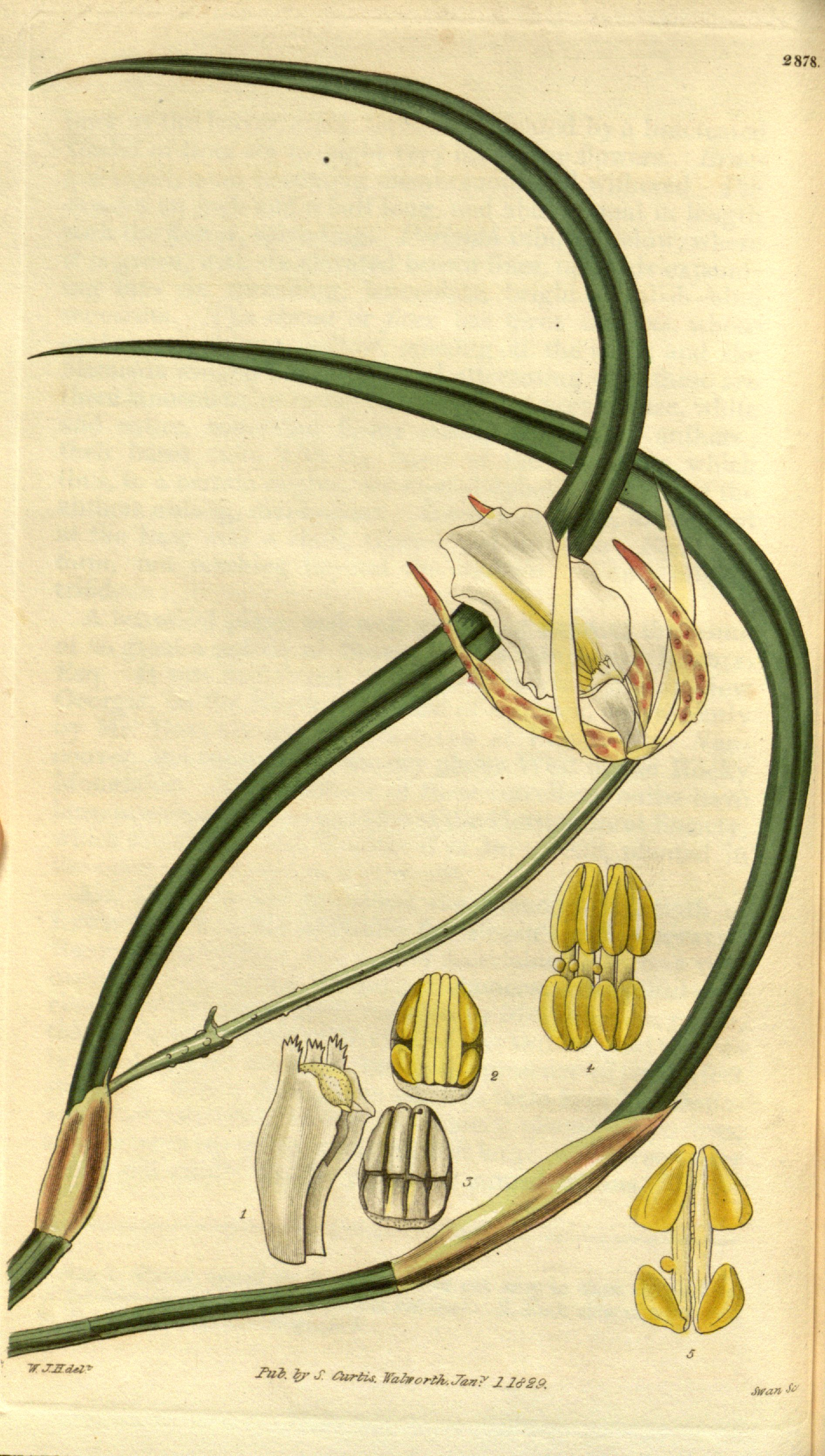
- 1829 illustration from Curtis's botanical magazine

Scientific classification
- Kingdom: Plantae
- Clade: Tracheophytes
- Clade: Angiosperms
- Clade: Monocots
- Order: Asparagales
- Family: Orchidaceae
- Subfamily: Epidendroideae
- Genus: Brassavola
- Species: B. tuberculata

Binomial name
- Brassavola tuberculata Hook. (1829)

Synonyms
- Bletia tuberculata (Hook.) Rchb.f. (1862); Tulexis bicolor Raf. (1838); Brassavola fragrans Lem. (1853); Brassavola gibbsiana G.Nicholson (1884)

= Brassavola tuberculata =

Species of orchid

Brassavola tuberculata is a species of orchid native to Bolivia, Paraguay, Argentina and Brazil.

Its diploid chromosome number has been determined as 2n = 40; its haploid chromosome number has been determined as n = 20.
