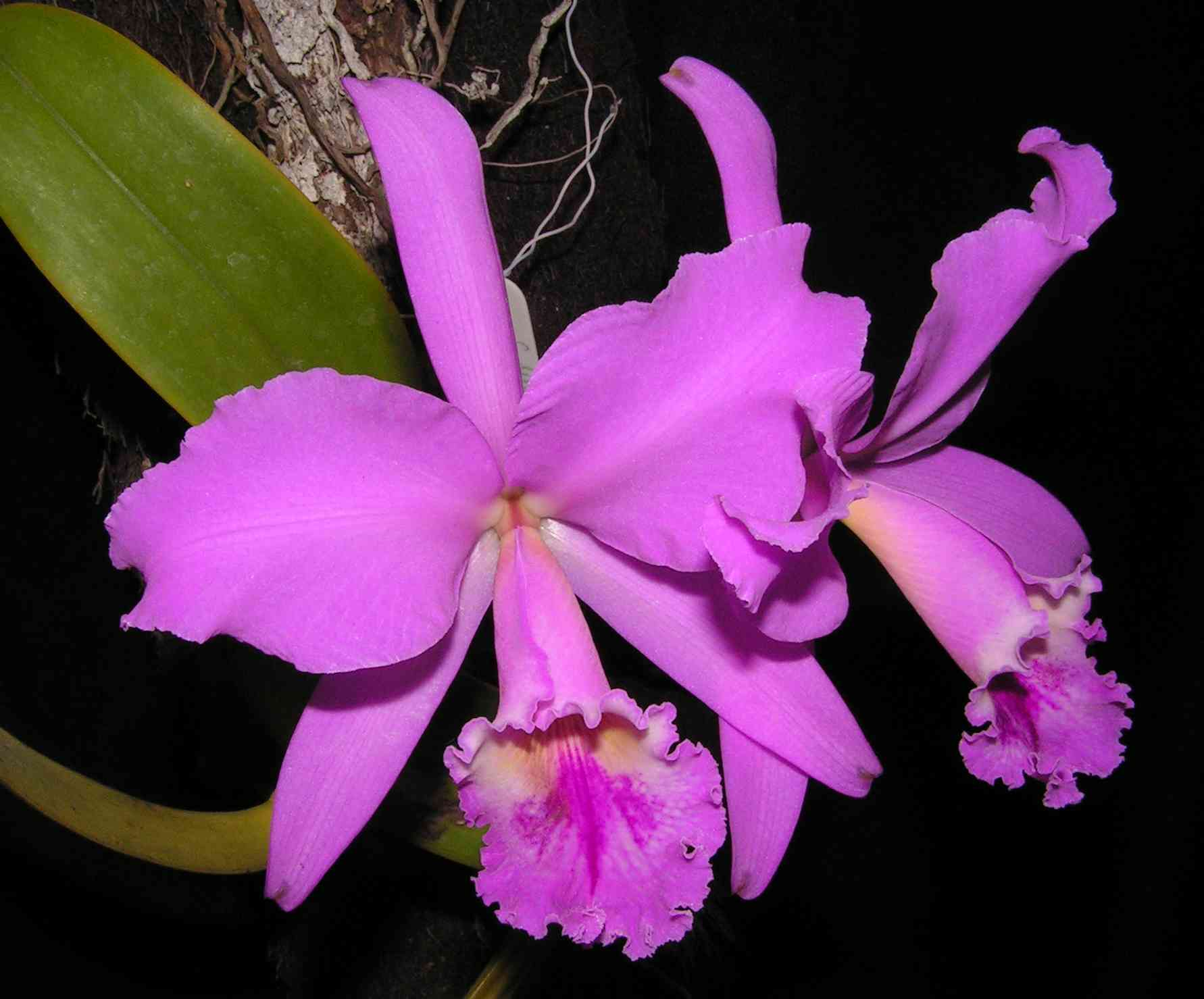

Scientific classification
- Kingdom: Plantae
- Clade: Tracheophytes
- Clade: Angiosperms
- Clade: Monocots
- Order: Asparagales
- Family: Orchidaceae
- Subfamily: Epidendroideae
- Genus: Cattleya
- Subgenus: Cattleya subg. Cattleya
- Section: Cattleya sect. Cattleya
- Species: C. labiata

Binomial name
- Cattleya labiata Lindl.

= Cattleya labiata =

Species of orchid

Cattleya labiata, also known as the crimson cattleya or ruby-lipped cattleya, is the type species of Cattleya, discovered in 1818 in Brazil.

== Description ==
This plant grows in Pernambuco, Alagoas, Ceará, and Sergipe in northeastern Brazil and is considered of Least Concern (LC) by the IUCN. It attains different sizes depending on the area from which it originates. Plants in Pernambuco are smaller with mostly lilac flowers. The interior part of the flower is a dark lilac color. Plants from Alagoas are bigger and have larger flowers. Some varieties, such as Cattleya labiata var. semialba, have large white flowers with a touch of yellow. There is another variety of semialba, with lilac in the inferior part of the flower. The plant is an epiphyte, growing on trees where light is plentiful. There are many other places where the plant also grows, such as directly on rock with little soil.

The plant itself is a medium-sized unifoliate (labiate) Cattleya, with a medium-sized rhizome. The plant has long leaves with a tough (coriaceous) consistency due to aridity in the tree's canopy, which results from a short dry season. For water requirements, the plant has a pseudobulb under every leaf to store water and nutritive substances during the short dry season. In the wet season, new leaves grow rapidly, producing a large flowered inflorescence. Flowers are white or lavender, with a darker spot on the lip. Pollination is performed by insects, usually by a scent-collecting male euglossine bee. The result is a capsule with a very large number of seeds (10,000-20,000).

The diploid chromosome number of C. labiata has been variously determined as 2n = 40, 41, and 46. The haploid chromosome number of C. labiata has been variously determined as n = 21 and 21.

== History ==
Its discovery by English naturalist William Swainson led to intense interest in orchids in Victorian society, leading to fierce competition to rediscover the flower's precise habitat.
