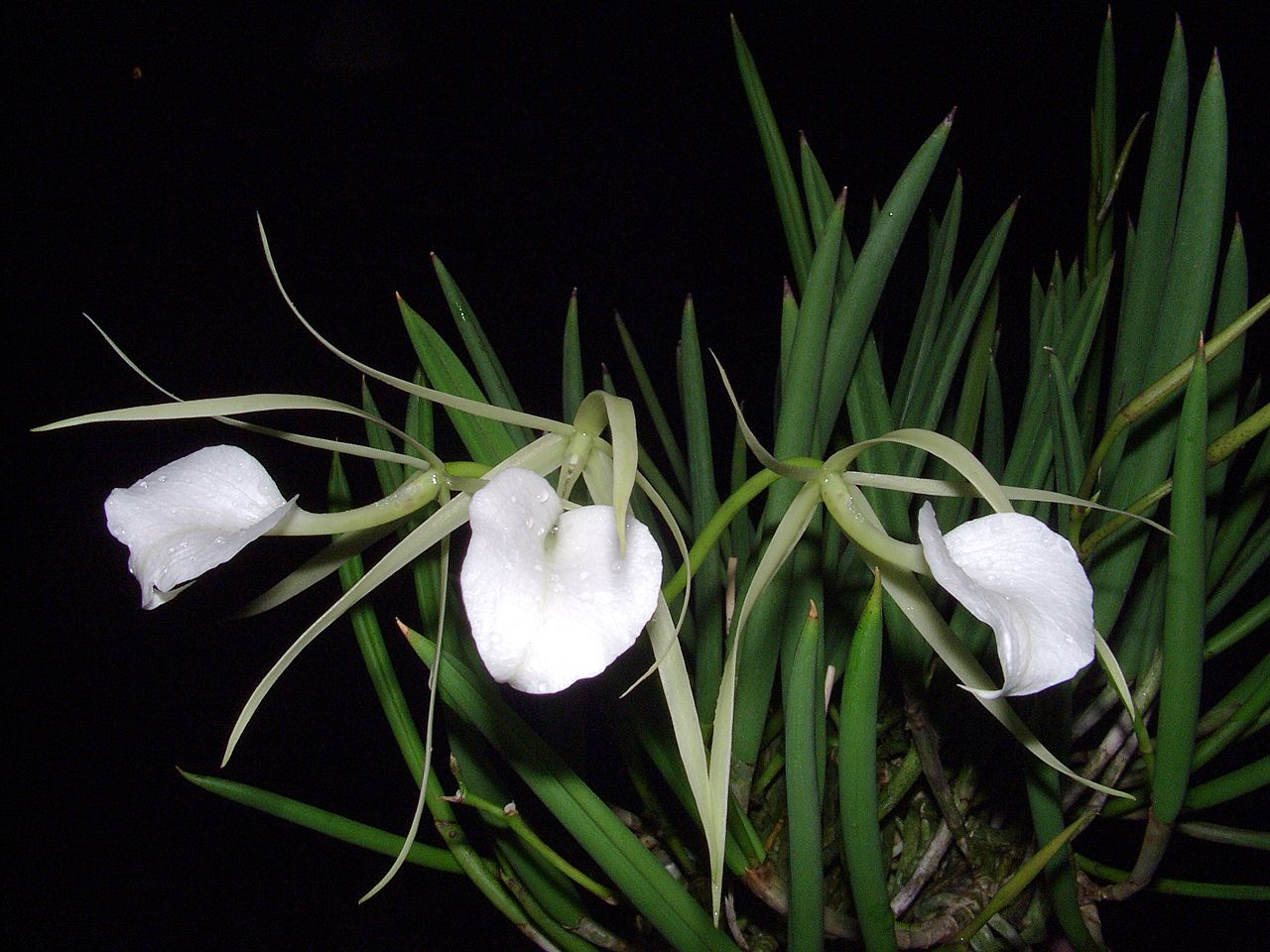

Scientific classification
- Kingdom: Plantae
- Clade: Tracheophytes
- Clade: Angiosperms
- Clade: Monocots
- Order: Asparagales
- Family: Orchidaceae
- Subfamily: Epidendroideae
- Genus: Brassavola
- Species: B. nodosa

Binomial name
- Brassavola nodosa (L.) Lindl.

Synonyms
- Epidendrum nodosum L. (1753) (Basionym); Cymbidium nodosum (L.) Sw. (1799); Bletia nodosa (L.) Rchb.f. (1862); Brassavola rhopalorrhachis Rchb.f. (1852); Bletia rhopalorrhachis (Rchb.f.) Rchb.f. (1862); Brassavola nodosa var. rhopalorrhachis Schltr. (1919); Brassavola scaposa Schltr. (1919)

= Brassavola nodosa =

Lady of the night

Species of orchid

Brassavola nodosa is a small, tough species of orchid native to Mexico (from Tamaulipas south to Chiapas and the Yucatán Peninsula), Central America, the West Indies, and northern South America (Venezuela, Colombia, Guyana and French Guiana). It is also known as "lady of the night" orchid due to its citrus and gardenia-like fragrance which begins in the early evening. It has been widely hybridized and cultivated for its showy flowers and pleasing scent.

== Scent ==
Brassavola nodosa is known for its exceptionally strong fragrance, which is emitted primarily after dark to attract night-pollinating moths. As is typical for moth-pollinated flowers, the scent of B. nodosa is described as "white floral". It is dominated by linalool, benzoates, salicylates, and nerolidol.

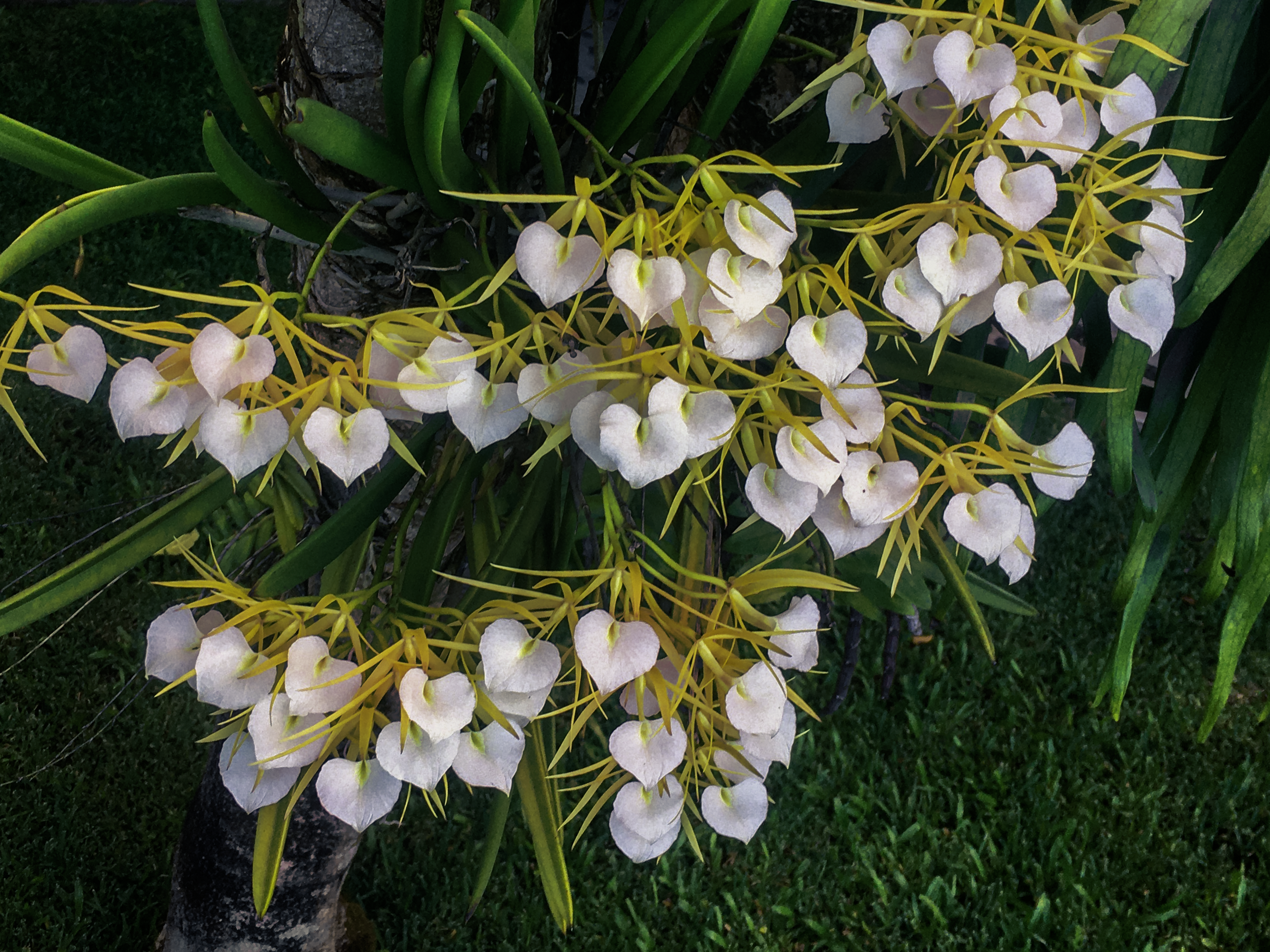
At dusk, a B. nodosa specimen such as this emits a distinct and pleasant fragrance.

== Genetics ==
The diploid chromosome number of B. nodosa has been determined to be 2n = 40.
