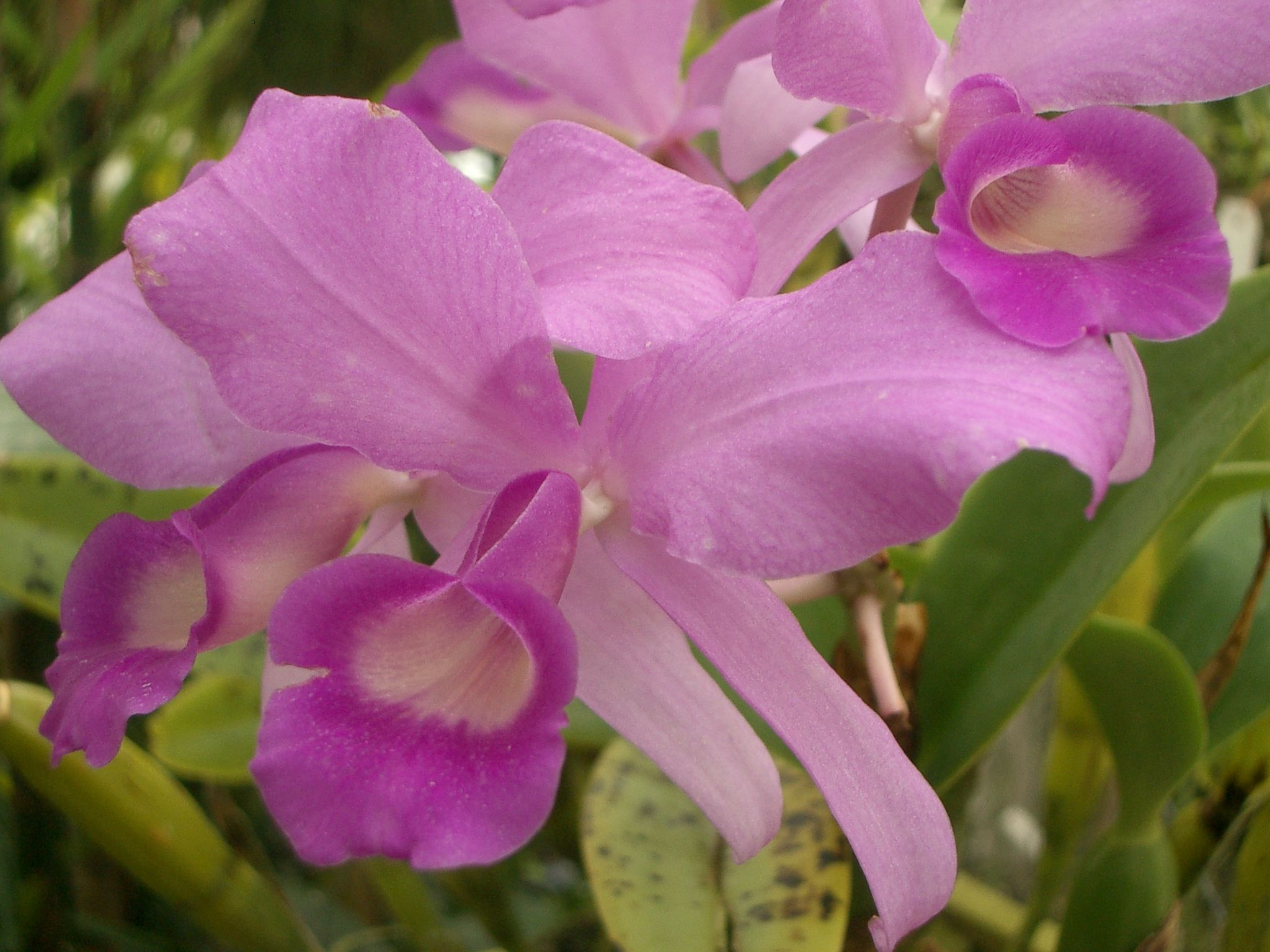
- Guarianthe skinneri

Scientific classification
- Kingdom: Plantae
- Clade: Embryophytes
- Clade: Tracheophytes
- Clade: Angiosperms
- Clade: Monocots
- Order: Asparagales
- Family: Orchidaceae
- Subfamily: Epidendroideae
- Tribe: Epidendreae
- Subtribe: Laeliinae
- Genus: Guarianthe; Dressler & W.E. Higgins (2003)

Type species
- Guarianthe skinneri

= Guarianthe =

Genus of orchids

Guarianthe, abbreviated Gur. in the horticultural trade, is a small genus of epiphytic orchids, growing in wet forests in Mexico, Central America, Colombia, Venezuela and Trinidad. It was separated from the bifoliate Cattleyas in 2003, based on phylogenetic studies of nuclear DNA sequence data.

== Species ==
| Image | Name | Distribution | Elevation (m) |
|---|---|---|---|
| | Guarianthe aurantiaca (Bateman) Dressler & W.E. Higgins 2003 | Widespread across much of Mexico, south to Costa Rica | 300 – 1600 meters |
| | Guarianthe bowringiana (Veitch) Dressler & W.E. Higgins 2003 | Chiapas, Belize, Guatemala, Honduras | 210 – 900 meters |
| | Guarianthe patinii (Cogn.) Dressler & W.E. Higgins 2003 | Costa Rica, Panama, Colombia, Venezuela, Trinidad; naturalized in Ecuador | 30 – 800 meters |
| | Guarianthe skinneri (Bateman) Dressler & W.E. Higgins 2003 | from Chiapas, Mexico south to Panama | 200 – 2300 meters |

== Natural hybrid ==
- Guarianthe × laelioides (Lem.) Van den Berg 2015 = Gur. aurantiaca × Gur. skinneri – Chiapas, Belize, Guatemala, Honduras, Nicaragua
