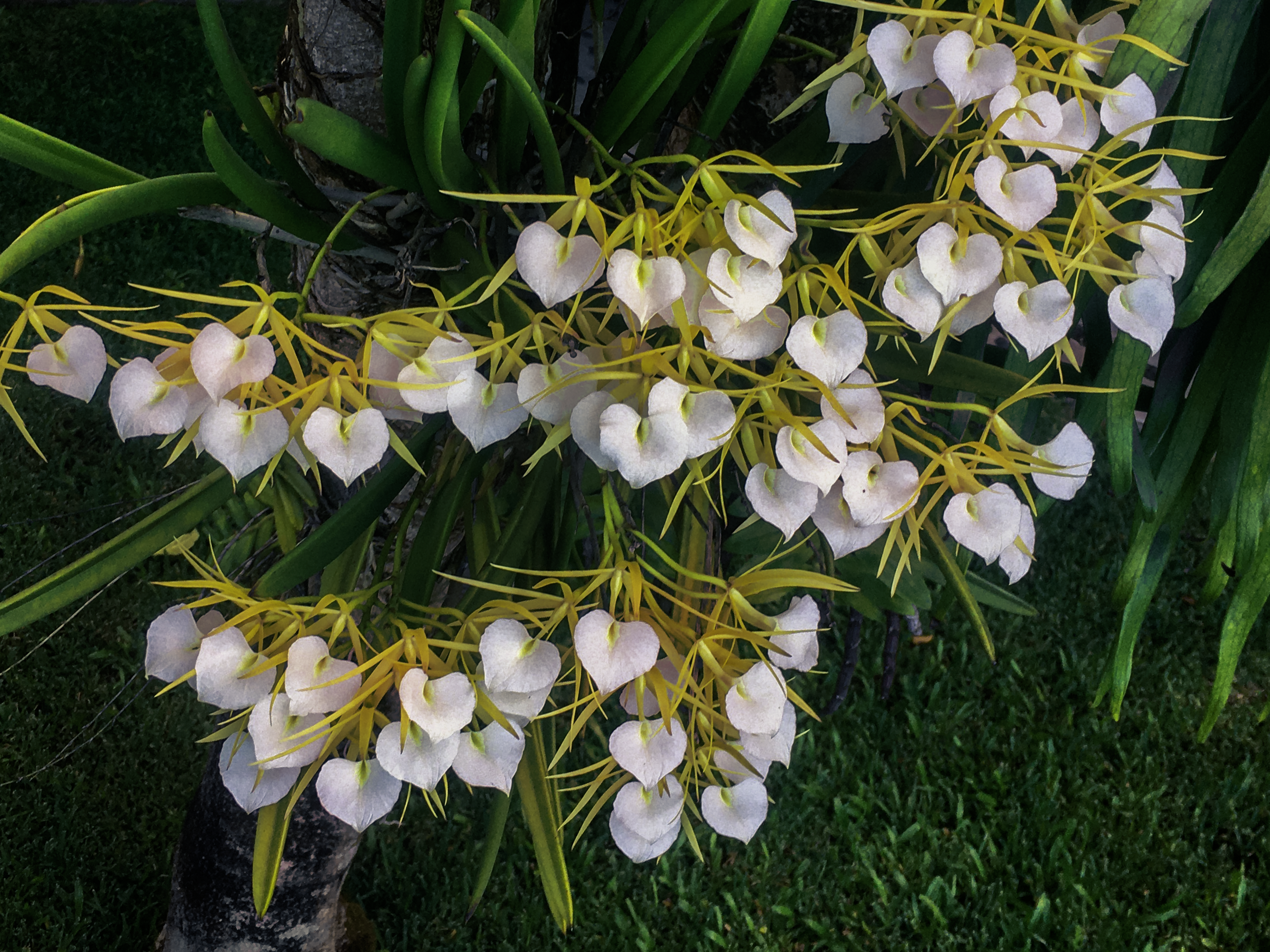
- Brassavola nodosa

Scientific classification
- Kingdom: Plantae
- Clade: Tracheophytes
- Clade: Angiosperms
- Clade: Monocots
- Order: Asparagales
- Family: Orchidaceae
- Subfamily: Epidendroideae
- Tribe: Epidendreae
- Subtribe: Laeliinae
- Genus: Brassavola; R.Br., 1813

Type species
- B. cucullata (L.) R.Br. in W.T.Aiton

Synonyms
- Eudisanthema Neck. ex Post & Kuntze; Lysimnia Raf.; Tulexis Raf.

= Brassavola =

Genus of orchids

Brassavola is a genus of 21 orchids (family Orchidaceae). They were named in 1813 by the Scottish botanist Robert Brown. The name comes from the Italian nobleman and physician Antonio Musa Brassavola. This genus is abbreviated B. in trade journals.

These species are widespread across Mexico, Central America, the West Indies and South America. They are epiphytes, and a few are lithophytes. A single, apical and succulent leaf grows on an elongated pseudobulb.

The orchid yields a single white or greenish white flower, or a raceme of a few flowers. The three sepals and two lateral petals are greenish, narrow and long. The base of the broad, sometimes fringed lip partially enfolds the column. This column has a pair of falciform (sickle-shaped) ears on each side of the front and contains twelve (sometimes eight) pollinia.

Most Brassavola orchids are very fragrant, attracting pollinators with their citrusy smell. But they are only fragrant at night, in order to attract the right moth. Longevity of flowers depends on the species and is between five and thirty days.

In 1698 Brassavola nodosa was the first tropical orchid to be brought from the Caribbean island Curaçao to Holland. Thus began the propagation of this orchid and the fascination for orchids in general.

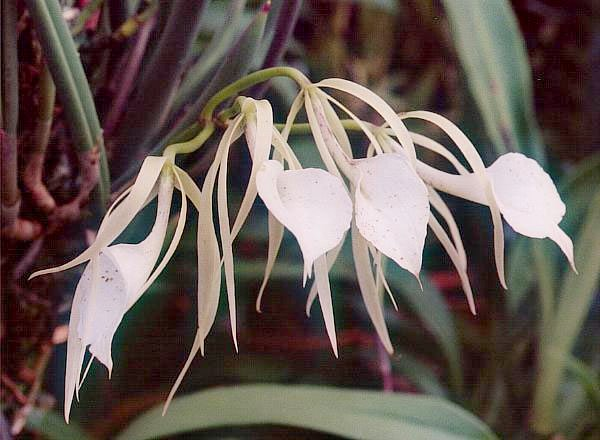
Lady-of-the-night orchid Brassavola nodosa

== Taxonomy ==
The species of Brassavola have been divided into four sections:

=== B. sect. Brassavola ===
This monotypic section, erected by H. G. Jones in 1969, contains the type of the genus:

Image	Name	Distribution	Elevation (m)
	B. appendiculata A.Rich. & Galeotti. 1845	Mexico to Nicaragua	
	B. cucullata [L.] R.Br. 1813 - Hooded brassavola, daddy longlegs orchid	Colombia to Venezuela and in the Caribbean	0–1,800 metres (0–5,906 ft)

=== B. sect. Sessilabia ===
This section, erected by Rolfe in 1902, is characterized by narrow labella with fimbriate margins to wider labella with entire margins.

Image	Name	Distribution	Elevation (m)
	B. amazonica Poepp. & Endl.	Brazil, Bolivia	
	B. angustata Lindl.	Brazil, Guyana, Suriname, Trinidad and Tobago, Venezuela	
	B. caraiensis Campacci & Rosim 2020	Brazil	870 metres (2,850 ft)
	B. ceboletta Rchb.f 1855	Brazil, Bolivia, Argentina, Peru, Paraguay	1,200–1,800 metres (3,900–5,900 ft)
	B. fasciculata Pabst 1955	Brazil	
	B. filifolia Linden 1881	Colombia	
	B. flagellaris Barb. Rodr. 1881	Brazil	
	B. gardneri Cogn. 1902	French Guiana, Brazil	
	B. martiana Lindl. 1836	S. Trop. America	50–1,000 metres (160–3,280 ft)
	B. pitengoensis Campacci 2016	Brazil	1,100 metres (3,600 ft)
	B. perrinii Lindley 1833	Argentina, Bolivia and Paraguay	1,980–2,580 metres (6,500–8,460 ft)
	B. reginae Pabst 1978	Argentina, Brazil, Peru	
	B. retusa Lindley 1847	Venezuela, N. Brazil to Peru	
	B. revoluta Barb. Rodr. 1882	Brazil	
	B. tuberculata Hooker 1829	Brazil, NE. Argentina and Paraguay	

=== B. sect. Cuneilabia ===
This section, erected by Rolfe in 1902, is characterized by narrowly constricted labellum bases. The sectional type is B. nodosa

Image	Name	Distribution	Elevation (m)
	B. harrisii H.G.Jones 1968	Jamaica	
	B. nodosa [L.]Lindley 1831 - Lady-of-the-night orchid	Mexico to Colombia	0–500 metres (0–1,640 ft)
	B. subulifolia Lindley 1831	Jamaica	
	B. xerophylla Archila 2013	Guatemala	

=== B. sect. Lateraliflorae ===
This section, erected by H.G.Jones in 1975, is characterized by laterally-borne inflorescences. The sectional type is B. acaulis

Image	Name	Distribution	Elevation (m)
	B. acaulis Lindl. 1851-2	C. America: Belize	

== Greges and hybrid genera ==
Brassavola is in the same alliance as the genera Cattleya and Laelia. They have been used extensively in hybridization and represent the "B" at the beginning of the names of such crosses. For example, Blc. is × Brassolaeliocattleya.

- B. Little Stars, a primary hybrid between B. nodosa and B. subulifolia
- × Rhynchovola 'David Sanders', a primary intergeneric hybrid between B. cucullata and Rhyncholaelia digbyana. Rhyncholaelia digbyana was formerly classified as a Brassavola; its hybrids have now been reclassified.
- × Brassocattleya 'Yellow Bird' = × Brassocattleya 'Richard Mueller × B. nodosa
- × Brassocattleya 'Richard Mueller' is a primary intergeneric hybrid between B. nodosa and C. milleri. C. milleri was formerly classified as a Laelia until it was transferred into Sophronitis which was then sunk into Cattleya to avoid confusion.
