= Robert Louis Dressler =

American botanist (1927-2019)

Robert (Louis) Dressler (born 1927, died October 15, 2019, in Paraíso, Costa Rica) was an American botanist specialist of the taxonomy of the Orchidaceae.

He graduated from the University of Southern California and Harvard University.

In 1977, botanist Hans Wiehler published Reldia, which is a genus of plants from South America in the family Gesneriaceae, with the name honouring Robert Louis Dressler.
