= Józef Warszewicz =

Polish botanist, biologist and plant and animal collector

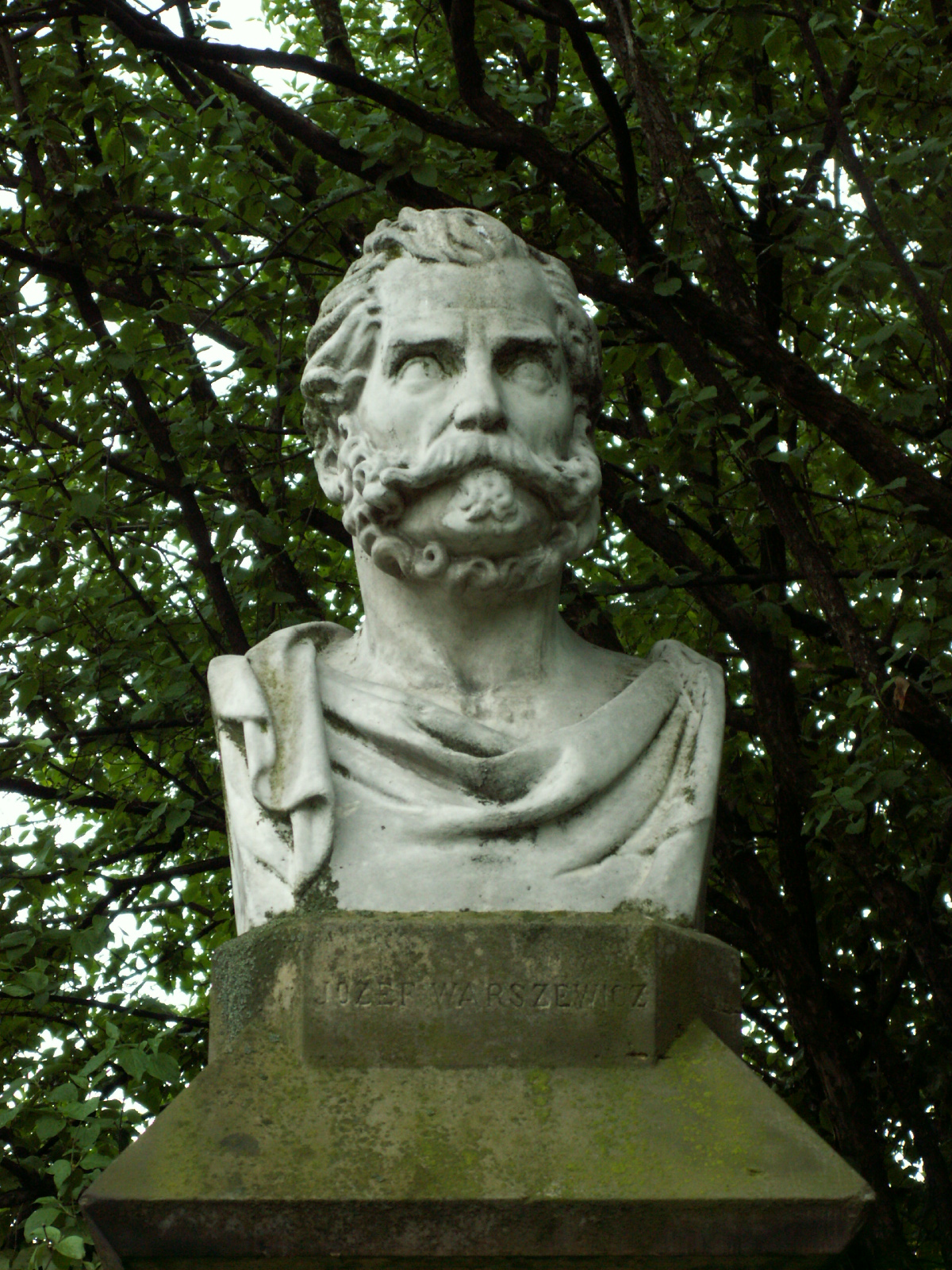
Warszewicz's bust in the Kraków Botanical Garden

Józef Warszewicz Ritter von Rawicz (Lithuanian: Juozapas Varševičius) (c. 8 September 1812 – 29 December 1866) was a Polish botanist, biologist and plant and animal collector.

== Life ==
Warszewicz was born on (c. 8 September 1812 in Vilnius, Lithuania. Born into an impoverished Polish family of lower nobility, he grew up in Vilnius, and became a botanist at the botanical garden of the Vilnius University. While at the university, he joined the November Uprising which was quickly and brutally suppressed, whereupon, with the remnants of the Polish army, he fled to Germany. In the years 1840-1844 he worked as assistant gardener in the Botanical Garden at Berlin.

In 1844, upon recommendation of Alexander von Humboldt, he was sent by Louis Benoît Van Houtte, a horticulturalist of Ghent, to join a Belgian colony in Guatemala, where he soon became an independent collector and wholesale supplier of plants to European horticulturalists and botanical gardens.

Warszewicz was especially interested in orchids, of which he imported enormous quantities, many of which were described by H.G. Reichenbach. He travelled and collected extensively throughout Central America, discovering a wealth of new plant species in Guatemala, Costa Rica and Panama, where he climbed the 11,000-foot Chiriqui Volcano.

He was also a herpetological collector. Warszewicz's collection of Central American frogs included many previously undescribed species. The specimens from the collection were sent to institutions in Berlin, Vienna and Kraków. In 1858 Oskar Schmidt described and illustrated many of the amphibians collected by Warszewicz.

Suffering from complications of yellow fever, Warszewicz returned to Germany in 1850. He spent some time working with Reichenbach in Berlin, but at the begin of 1851 he left for South America. At the end of that year he was robbed of all his possessions in Guayaquil. Undaunted, he travelled throughout Ecuador, Bolivia and Peru, collecting and discovering many new plant species. He also collected animals and cultural artefacts.

A recurrence of yellow fever in 1853 compelled Warszewicz to return to Kraków where he became supervisor of the Botanical Gardens. He retained this position until his death. He died in Kraków on 9 December 1866. His exsiccates were bequeathed to the Berlin Botanic Garden.

== Selected taxa ==
Warscewiczella Rchb.f., Warszewiczia and Warscaea Szlach. (a synonym of Cyclopogon) were named after him as well as many species, e.g.

- Gymnogramma warscewiczii Mett. (Adiantaceae)
- Hippeastrum warscewiczianum A.Dietr. (Amaryllidaceae)
- Anthurium warscewiczii K.Koch (Araceae)
- Philodendron warszewiczii K. Koch & C.D. Bouché (Araceae)
- Nunnezharria warscewicziana Kuntze (Arecaceae )
- Callaeolepium warscewiczii H.Karst. (Asclepiadaceae )
- Begonia warscewiczii Neuman (Begoniaceae)
- Lamproconus warscewiczii Lem. (Bromeliaceae)
- Lobelia warscewiczii Vatke (Campanulaceae)
- Anguria warscewiczii Hook. (Cucurbitaceae)
- Columnea warscewicziana Klotzsch & Hanst. (Gesneriaceae)
- Calathea warscewiczii Körn. (Marantaceae )
- Ugni warscewiczii O.Berg (Myrtaceae)
- Cattleya warscewiczii Rchb.f. (Orchidaceae )
- Fernandezia warscewiczii Schltr. (Orchidaceae )
- Miltonia warscewiczii Rchb.f. (Orchidaceae )
- Odontoglossum warscewiczianum Hemsl. (Orchidaceae )
- Phragmipedium warscewiczianum (Rchb.f.) Garay (Orchidaceae )
- Esenbeckia warscewiczii Engl. (Rutaceae)
- Alonsoa warscewiczii Regel (Scrophulariaceae)
- Iochroma warscewiczii Regel (Solanaceae)
- Tropaeolum warscewiczii Buchenau (Tropaeolaceae)

== Notes ==
- Note regarding personal names: Ritter is a title, best translated as Knight, in the British sense of an hereditary knighthood, not a first or middle name.
- For reasons known only to him, H. G. Reichenbach consistently misspelled Warszewicz’s name as Warscewicz or Warczewicz, the latter spellings being valid following older rules of nomenclature, maintaining the spelling in the protolog. However, orthographic and typographic errors may be amended according to articles 60 and 32.6 of the 1994 International Code of Botanical Nomenclature.
- Until recently, due to a misprint, IPNI had the title of nobility von Rawicz spelled as Rawiez, but that was corrected.
