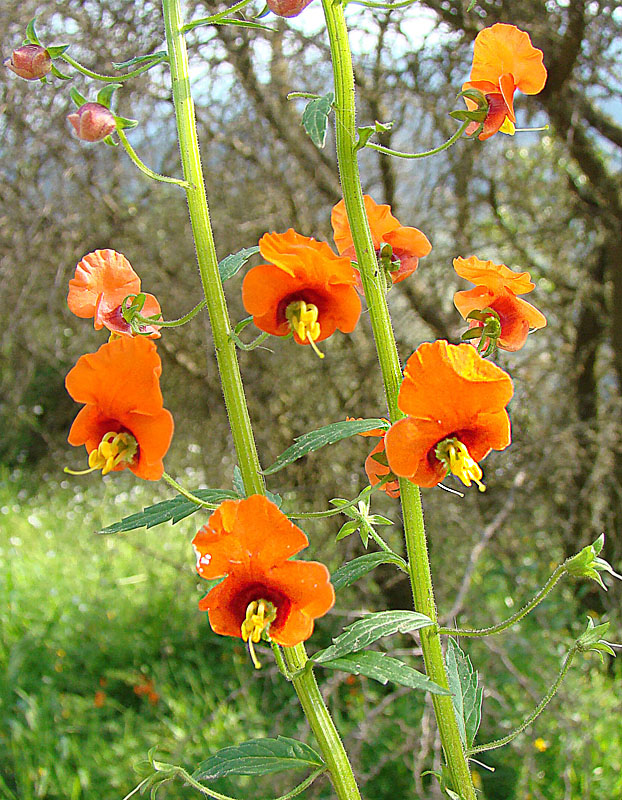
- Alonsoa meridionalis

Scientific classification
- Kingdom: Plantae
- Clade: Tracheophytes
- Clade: Angiosperms
- Clade: Eudicots
- Clade: Asterids
- Order: Lamiales
- Family: Scrophulariaceae
- Tribe: Hemimerideae
- Genus: Alonsoa; Ruiz & Pav.

Species
- See text

= Alonsoa =

Genus of flowering plants

Alonsoa (mask flower) is a genus of 12 species of flowering plants in the family Scrophulariaceae. The genus includes both herbaceous and shrubby species.

The genus is native to Central and western South America, from south Mexico to Peru and Chile. At least two species are native to South Africa. Alonsoas grow to around 30–100 cm tall, and have small, broadly oval, serrated leaves. The red, orange, yellow, white or occasionally blue flowers are borne on a loose terminal raceme.

The alonsoa is named after Zenón de Alonso Acosta, a Spanish official in Bogotá, Colombia.

== Species ==
- Alonsoa acutifolia Ruiz & Pav.
- Alonsoa albiflora G.Nicholson
- Alonsoa auriculata Diels
- Alonsoa caulialata Ruiz & Pav.
- Alonsoa hirsuta (Spreng.) Steud.
- Alonsoa honoraria Grau
- Alonsoa linearis (Jacq.) Ruiz & Pav.
- Alonsoa meridionalis (L.f.) Kuntze
- Alonsoa minor Edwin
- Alonsoa pallida Edwin
- Alonsoa peduncularis (Kuntze) Wettst.
- Alonsoa quadrifolia G.Don
- Alonsoa serrata Pennell
