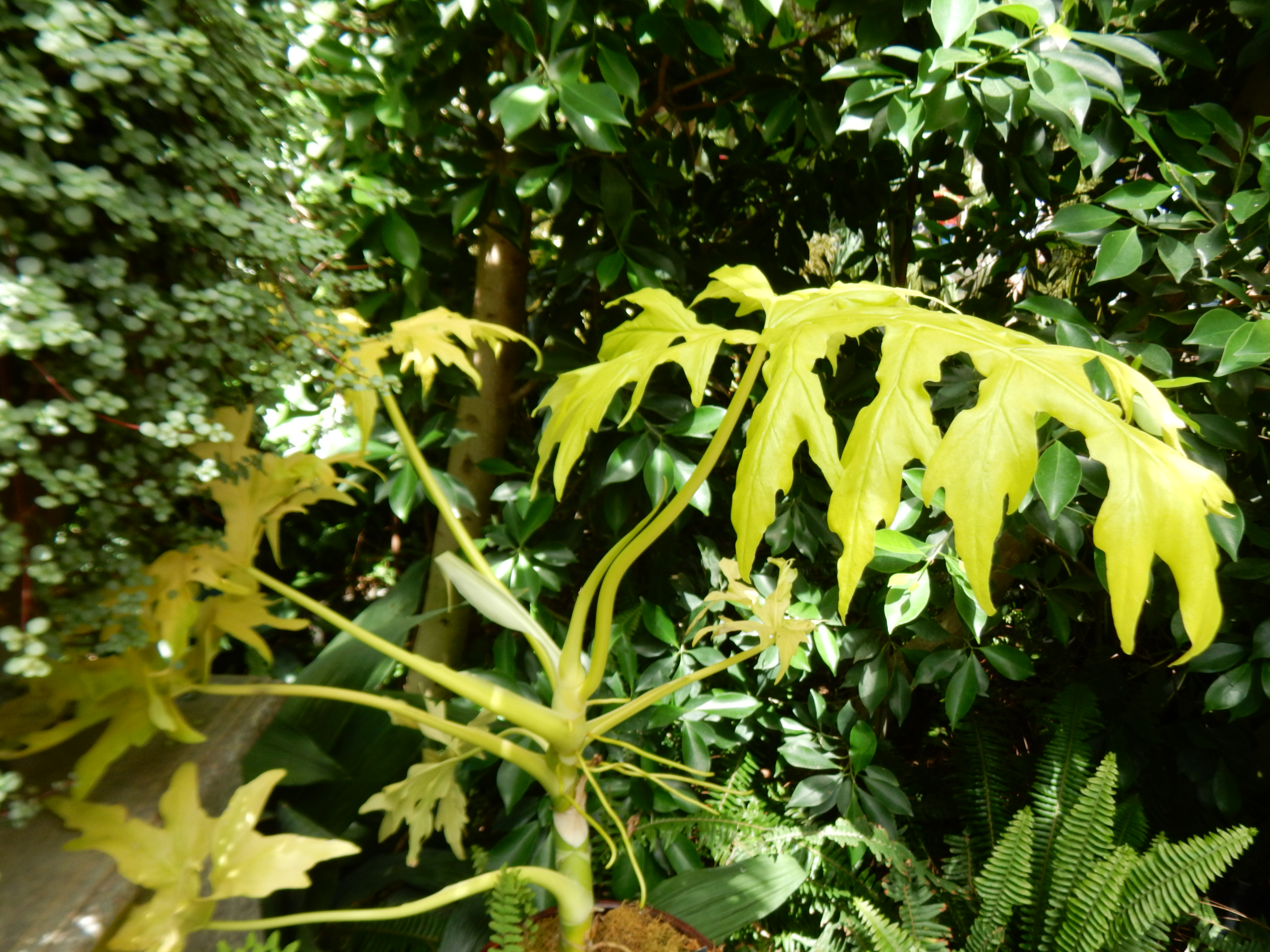
- Philodendron warszewiczii 'Aurea' at Longwood Gardens

Scientific classification
- Kingdom: Plantae
- Clade: Tracheophytes
- Clade: Angiosperms
- Clade: Monocots
- Order: Alismatales
- Family: Araceae
- Genus: Philodendron
- Species: P. warszewiczii

Binomial name
- Philodendron warszewiczii K.Koch & C.D.Bouché

Synonyms
- Anthurium warszewiczii K.Koch; Philodendron serpens Engl

= Philodendron warszewiczii =

- Philodendron warszewiczii, pictured in Nayarit, Mexico by Eric Knight

Species of plant

Philodendron warszewiczii is a species of flowering plant in the family Araceae. It is native to southern Mexico, and to Central America. A climber, it is typically found in the seasonally dry tropics at elevations from 300 to 1,900 m (1,000 to 6,200 ft), where it can grow in soil, on rocks, or epiphytically on trees. It is facultatively deciduous in the dry season.

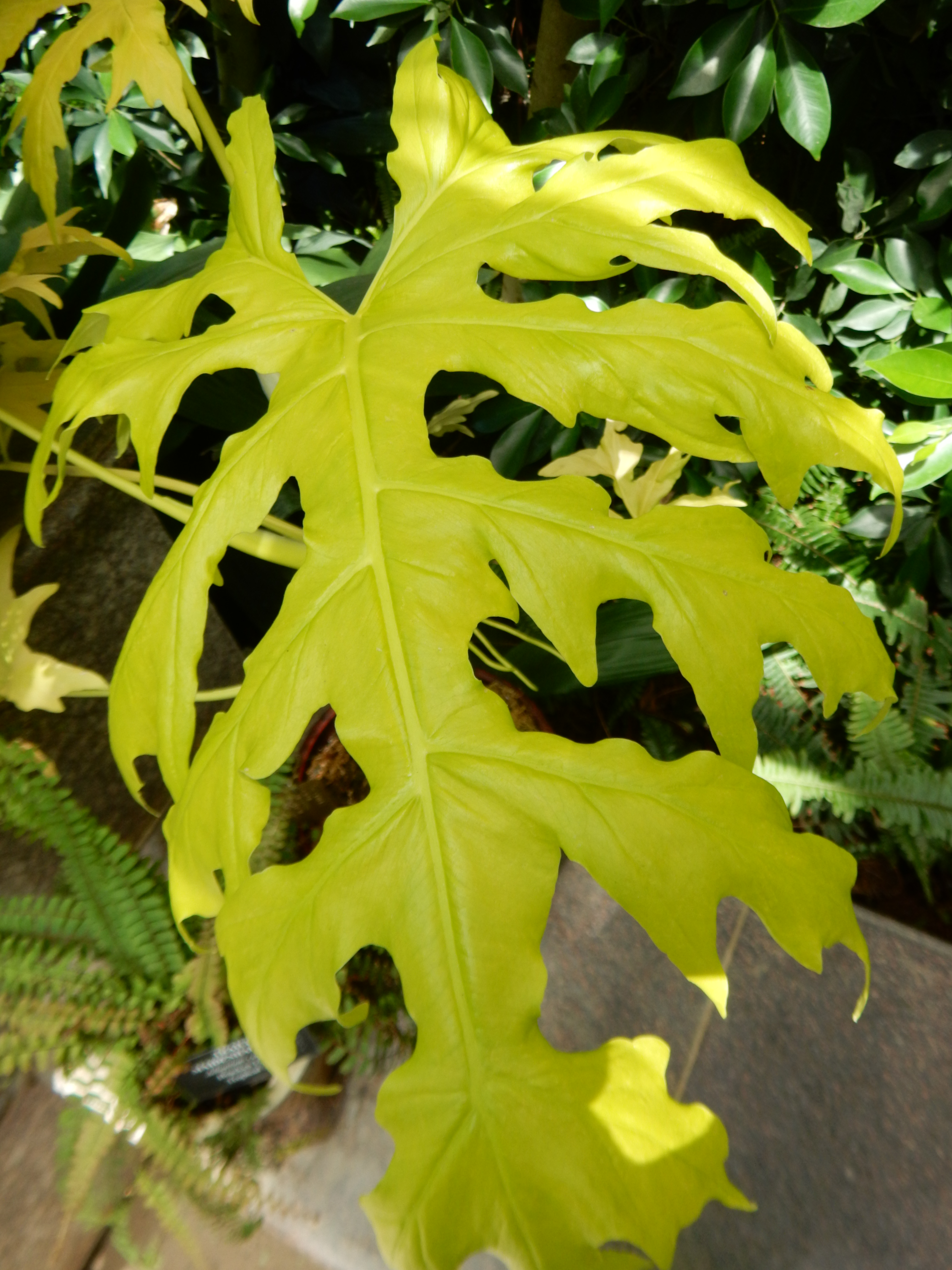
Philodendron warszewiczii 'Aurea' leaf at Longwood Gardens

Named after Polish botanist, biologist and plant and animal collector, Józef Warszewicz.
