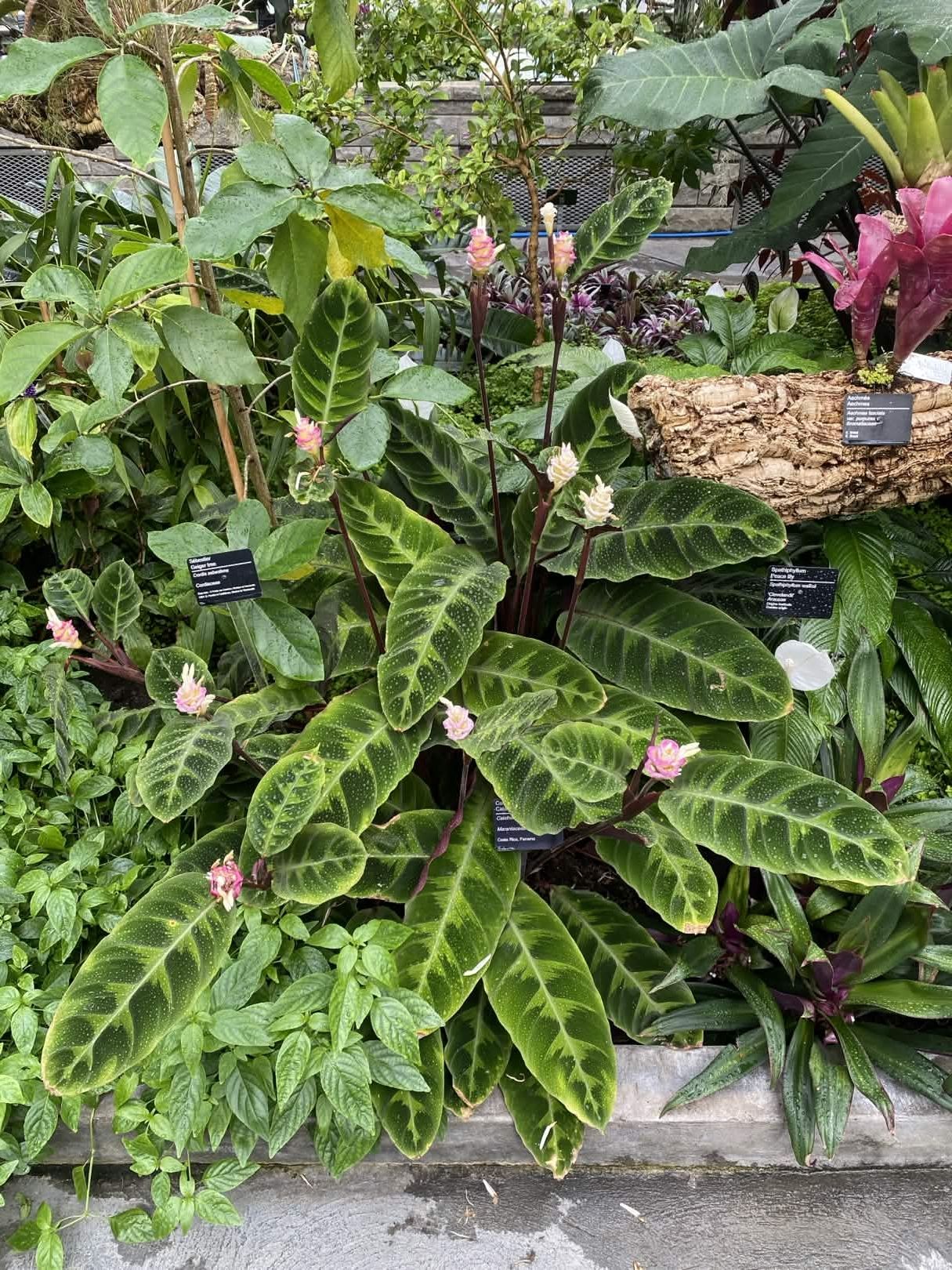

Scientific classification
- Kingdom: Plantae
- Clade: Tracheophytes
- Clade: Angiosperms
- Clade: Monocots
- Clade: Commelinids
- Order: Zingiberales
- Family: Marantaceae
- Genus: Goeppertia
- Species: G. warszewiczii

Binomial name
- Goeppertia warszewiczii (Lem.) Borchs. & S.Suárez

Synonyms
- Calathea warszewiczii (Lem.) Planch. & Linden; Maranta warszewiczii Lem.; Phrynium warszewiczii (Lem.) Klotzsch; Phyllodes warszewiczii (Lem.) Kuntze

= Goeppertia warszewiczii =

Species of flowering plant

Goeppertia warszewiczii (previously Calathea warscewiczii) is a species of perennial, herbaceous plant from the genus Goeppertia in the Marantaceae family, native to Costa Rica, El Salvador, Honduras, Nicaragua and Panamá. The specific epithet warszewiczii refers to Józef Warszewicz.

== Description ==
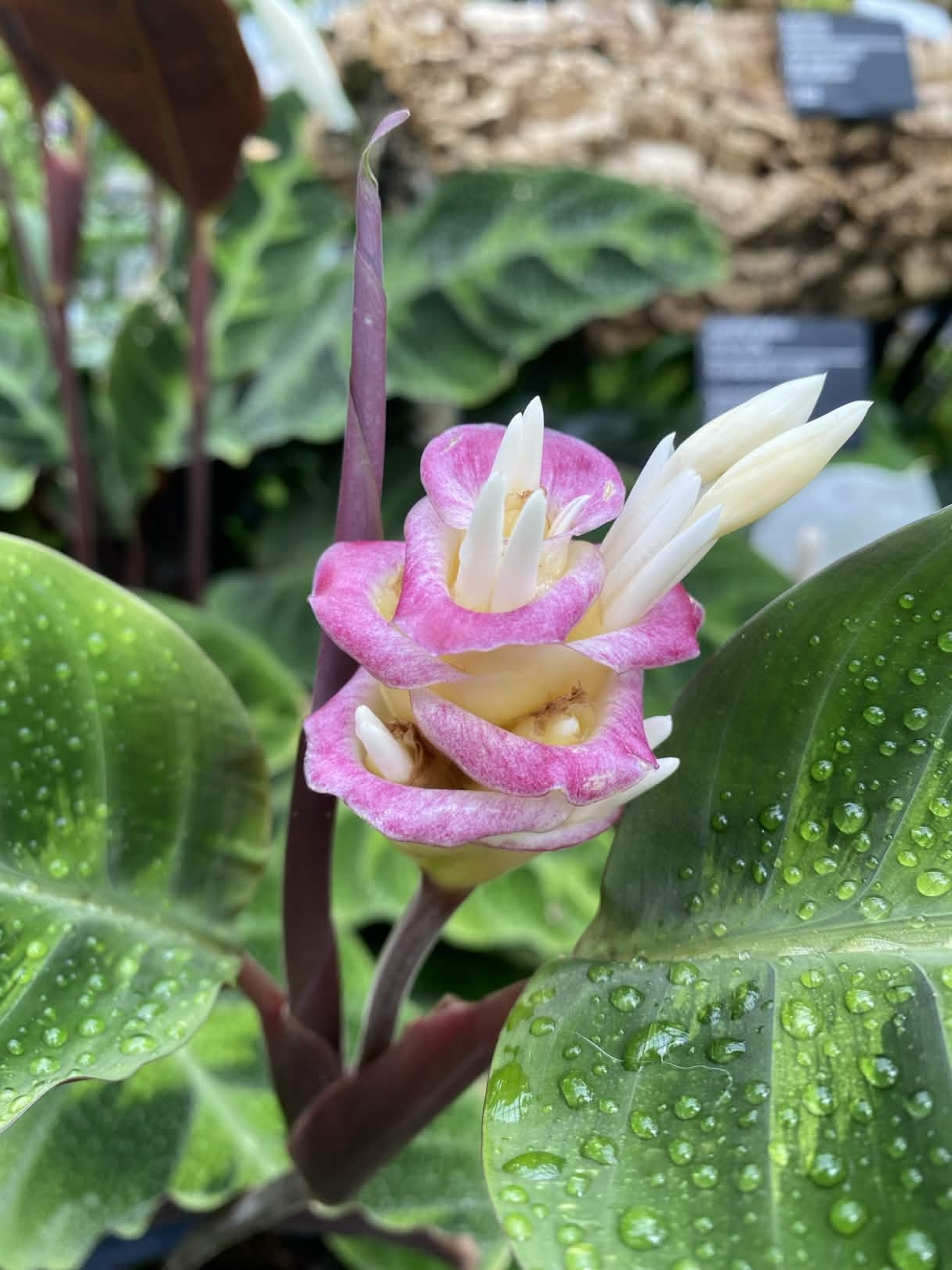
Inflroescence of Goeppertia warszewiczii

Goeppertia warszeiwczii is a medium sized plant with long, dark green velvety leaves, with short and thick; purple petioles and short; purple pulvinus. The leaves usually have a pattern on the upper side of the leaf, with a saw tooth, light green band along the middle vein. The inflorescence of G.warszewiczii is made of multiple bracts around a short, purple peduncle. The bracts appear white at first and slowly fade into a deep purple color with time, the flowers often stay closed throughout the flowering process until a pollinator come to open it. The flowers are white creamy.

== Uses ==
The Teribe use Goeppertia warscewiczii for treating snakebites.

== Similar species ==
In, Costa Rica, it is often confused with a very similar species Goeppertia leucostachys. This later plant has an extremely similar inflorescence and dark green velvety leaves. The key to differentiate those two species is the hair being found on the whole plant of G.leucostachys. On this species, the bracts, peduncle, petioles, leaves are all hairy, unlike on Goeppertia warszewiczii.
