= Cyclopogon elegans =

Scientific classification
- Kingdom: Plantae
- Clade: Tracheophytes
- Clade: Angiosperms
- Clade: Monocots
- Order: Asparagales
- Family: Orchidaceae
- Subfamily: Orchidoideae
- Tribe: Cranichideae
- Genus: Cyclopogon
- Species: C. elegans

Binomial name
- Cyclopogon elegans Hoehne (1944)

Synonyms
- Beadlea elegans (Hoehne) Garay

Species of orchid

Cyclopogon elegans is a species of terrestrial orchids in the genus Cyclopogon native to Brazil and Argentina.
