= Cyclopogon cranichoides =

Conservation status
- Apparently Secure (NatureServe)

Scientific classification
- Kingdom: Plantae
- Clade: Tracheophytes
- Clade: Angiosperms
- Clade: Monocots
- Order: Asparagales
- Family: Orchidaceae
- Subfamily: Orchidoideae
- Tribe: Cranichideae
- Genus: Cyclopogon
- Species: C. cranichoides

Binomial name
- Cyclopogon cranichoides (Griseb.) Schltr.

Synonyms
- Beadlea cranichoides (Griseb.) Small; Beadlea cranichoides f. alba P.M.Br. & C.L.McCartney; Beadlea cranichoides f. albolabia P.M.Br. & C.L.McCartney; Beadlea storeri (Chapm.) Small; Cyclopogon cranichoides f. albolabia (P.M.Br. & C.L.McCartney) P.M.Br.; Cyclopogon nigricans (Schltr.) Schltr.; Cyclopogon storeri (Chapm.) Szlach., Mytnik & Rutk.; Pelexia cranichoides Griseb.; Sauroglossum cranichoides (Griseb.) Ames; Sauroglossum nigricans Schltr.; Spiranthes cranichoides (Griseb.) Cogn.; Spiranthes storeri Chapm.

Species of orchid

Cyclopogon cranichoides, also known as Speckled Ladies’ Tresses, is a terrestrial species of orchid. It grows from south Florida to the tropical Americas. It was first described by August Grisebach as Pelexia cranichoides and later placed in the genus Cyclopogon by Rudolf Schlechter.

== Description ==
C. cranichoides is an orchid that grows in the West Indies, Central America, and northern South America. It is small, growing about 40 centimetres (16 in) tall. It grows in humus, in the moist shade of hammocks. The roots are fusiform and fleshy, growing about 0.45 by 0.4–0.8 centimetres (0.18 in × 0.16 in–0.31 in) wide and tall.

There are funnelform, tube-shaped flowers, which have green-brown dorsal sepals that are darker near the midvein and apex. Those sepals are narrow and elliptic to pandurate, being 3.5–5 by 1.2–2 millimetres (0.138 in–0.197 in × 0.047 in–0.079 in), with an acute apex. It flowers in February through March.

The proximal parts of the petals are greenish-brownish, while the distant parts are greenish-white. The petals have dark brown apical margins and midveins. They are narrowly spatulate-oblanceolate, being 4.5 by 0.5–1 millimetre (0.177 in × 0.020 in–0.039 in), and they have an acute apex.

The lip is white, canaliculate, oblong, and is constricted near the middle or end, and is widest near the constriction. It reaches 5 by 2.5 millimetres (0.197 in × 0.098 in) at the middle. It has a gibbose base with two tubercles. The apex is slightly flared.

The lateral sepals are often reflexed, and they are narrowly elliptic to narrowly pandurate. They are 4–6 by 1–1.5 millimetres (0.16 in–0.24 in × 0.04 in–0.06 in) with an acute apex.

The column is slender, being 3.5 millimetres (0.14 in) long. The pollinia are yellow, and the ovary is 4–7 millimetres (0.16–0.28 in). The capsules are ellipsoid and erect, and they are 6–8 by 3.5–4.5 millimetres (0.24 in–0.31 in × 0.14 in–0.18 in).

There are three to eight oval-shaped leaves, which are petiolate and suberect, with a greenish-purple top and a purple underside, which sometimes have white marks. The leaves are 2.5–8 by 1.3–3.8 centimetres (0.98 in–3.15 in × 0.51 in–1.50 in), and have an acute to obtuse tip.

There are pubescent mottled-purple inflorescences which are racemes that grow up to 15 centimetres (6 in) as the fruit matures. There are mottled-lanceolate floral bracts that are longer than the ovaries.

== Ecology, taxonomy, and distribution ==
There was a 1990 study on the growth and reproduction of C. cranichoides, which was carried out by Ricardo Calvo. The rhomboid leaves die during reproduction, and afterward, another shoot may take the place of the original.

C. cranichoides has a large number of synonyms. The synonyms include Beadlea cranichoides, Pelexia cranichoides, Sauroglossum cranichoides, Spiranthes cranichoides, Cyclopogon nigricans, and Spiranthes storeri.
