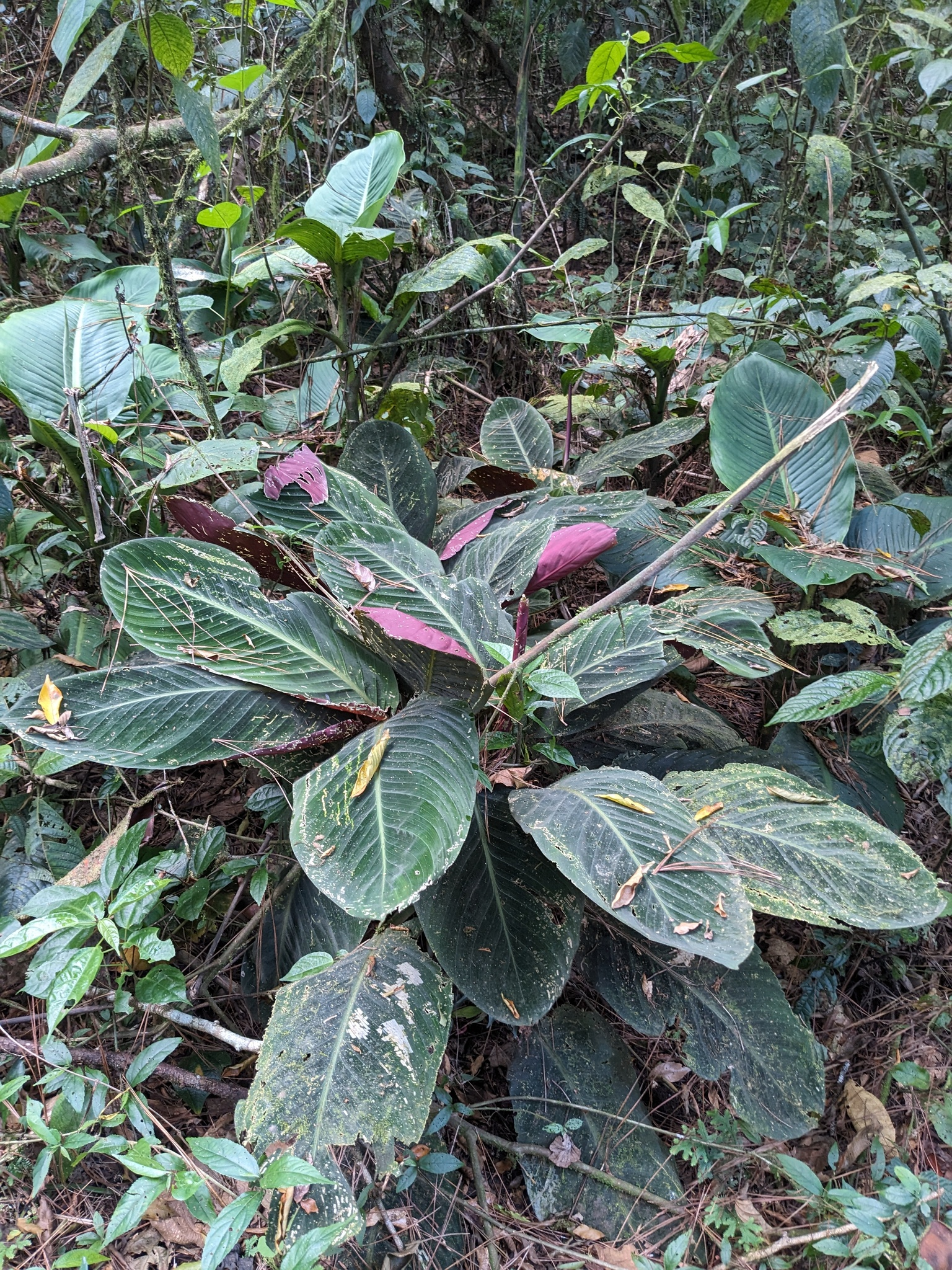

Scientific classification
- Kingdom: Plantae
- Clade: Embryophytes
- Clade: Tracheophytes
- Clade: Spermatophytes
- Clade: Angiosperms
- Clade: Monocots
- Clade: Commelinids
- Order: Zingiberales
- Family: Marantaceae
- Genus: Goeppertia
- Species: G. leucostachys

Binomial name
- Goeppertia leucostachys (Hook.f.) Borchs. & S.Suárez

Synonyms
- Calathea leucostachys Hook.f.; Phyllodes leucostachys (Hook.f.) Kuntze; Calathea valeriana Standl.

= Goeppertia leucostachys =

Species of plant

Goeppertia leucostachys is a species of plant from the genus Goeppertia in the family Marantaceae. It is native from Costa Rica, Nicaragua and Panamá.

== Description ==
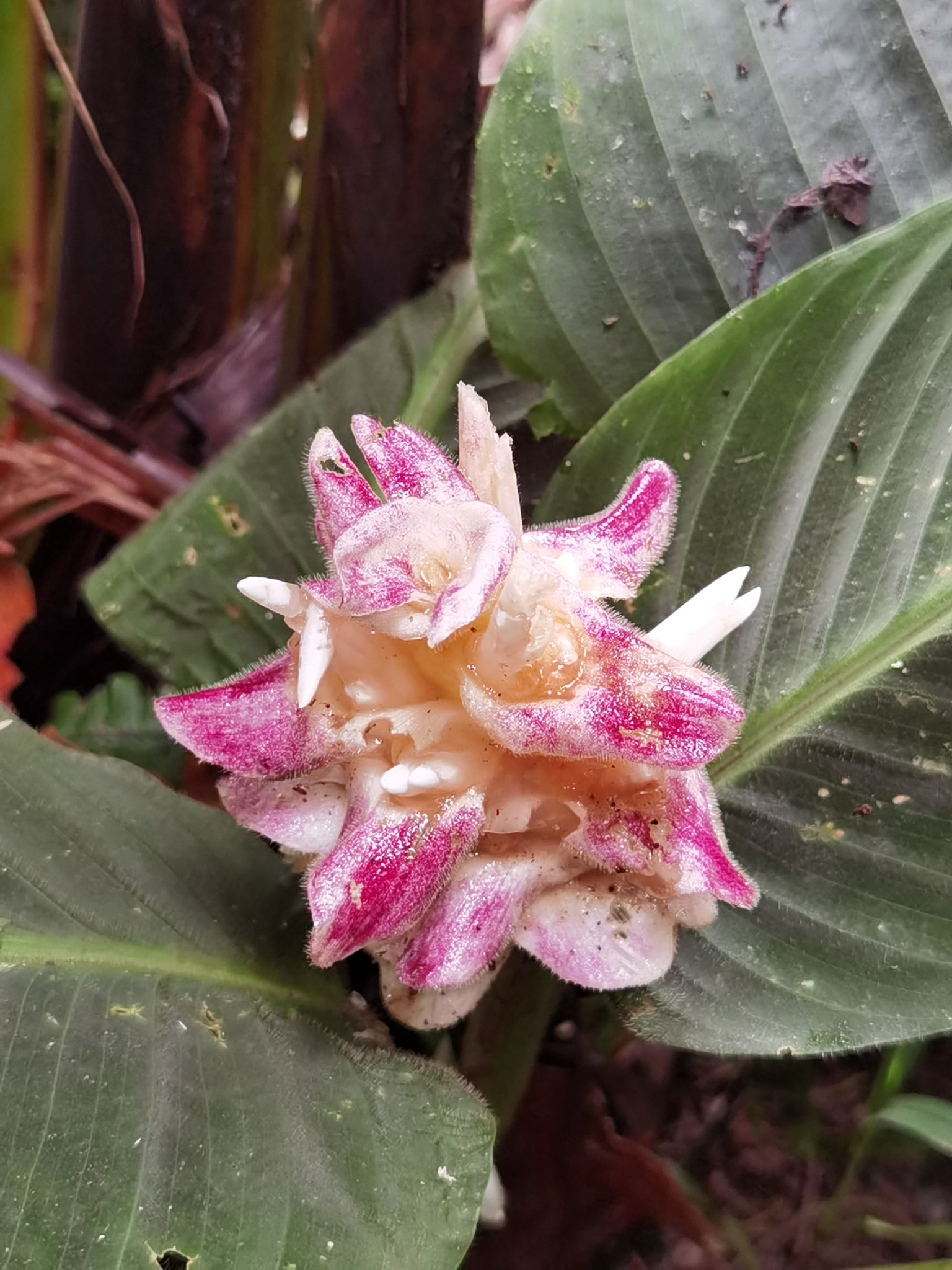
Inflorescence of Goeppertia leucostachys

Goeppertia leucostachys is a medium sized plant with dark green velvety leaves, a purple back, thick green petioles and a very short pulvinus. It is very similar to Goeppertia warszewiczii but is fully hairy and doesn't have the leaf pattern on the upper side of the leaf, usually only the middle vein is light green and the rest dark green. The inflorescence is made of multiple bracts on a thick, green peduncle. The bracts are white and develop a pink color with time. The flowers stay closed throughout the flowering process and are fully white. The inflorescence is also very similar to G.warszewiczii but is fully hairy compared to fully glabrous on the later.
