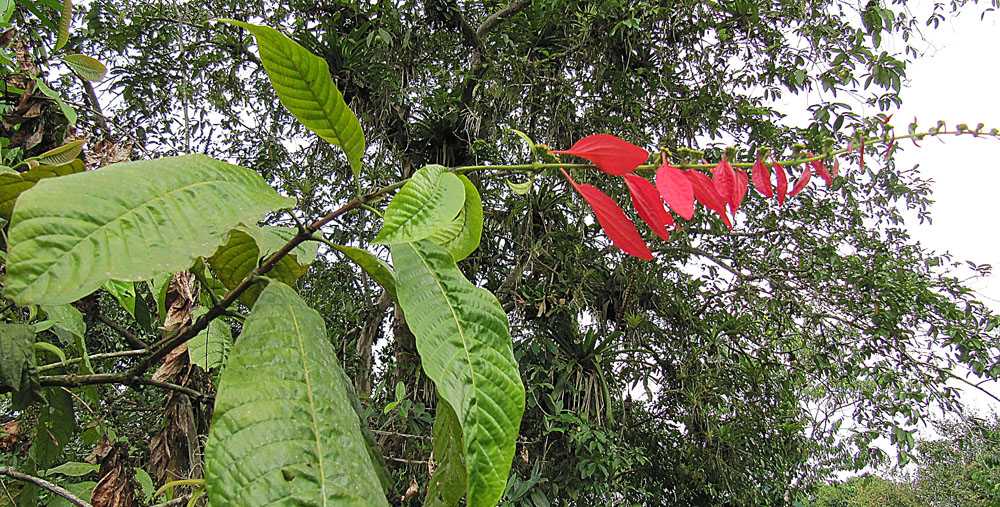
- Warszewiczia coccinea growing wild in Sarapiqui, Heredia Province, northern Costa Rica

Scientific classification
- Kingdom: Plantae
- Clade: Tracheophytes
- Clade: Angiosperms
- Clade: Eudicots
- Clade: Asterids
- Order: Gentianales
- Family: Rubiaceae
- Genus: Warszewiczia
- Species: W. coccinea

Binomial name
- Warszewiczia coccinea (Vahl) Klotzsch, 1853

= Warszewiczia coccinea =

Species of plant

Warszewiczia coccinea (or chaconia, wild poinsettia, pastora del monte and pride of Trinidad and Tobago) is a species of flowering plant in the family Rubiaceae. It is native in the south of Central America from Nicaragua southward, the southern West Indies, and southward through northern South America to Bolivia and central Brazil. It is the national flower of Trinidad and Tobago.

This evergreen shrub or small tree grows to 6 metres tall, with leaves up to 60 cm long and 30 cm broad. It is remarkable for its inflorescence, a verticillaster up to 50 cm long with up to a dozen clusters with bright red bracts (up to 7 by 5 cm) and small flowers with inconspicuous yellow petals.

Its habitat is lowland, forests and second growth. Its optimum elevation is from sea level to 500 m. It is rarely found in areas above 500 m.

== Cultivation ==
It is widely grown as an ornamental tree. A cultivar, Warszewiczia coccinea 'David Auyong', which has a double row of bracts, is the most widely cultivated form. This plant originates from cuttings taken from a wild plant found growing along a Trinidad roadside in 1957. All double chaconias have been propagated by cuttings from this individual.

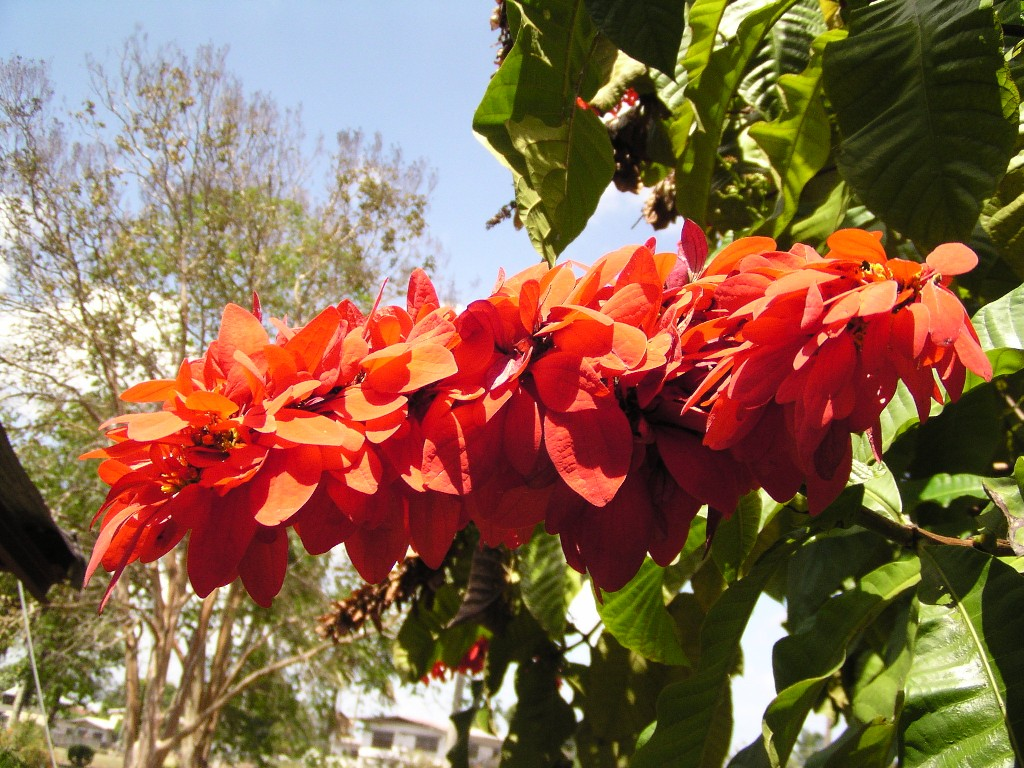
Double chaconia at the University of the West Indies, St. Augustine, Trinidad and Tobago
