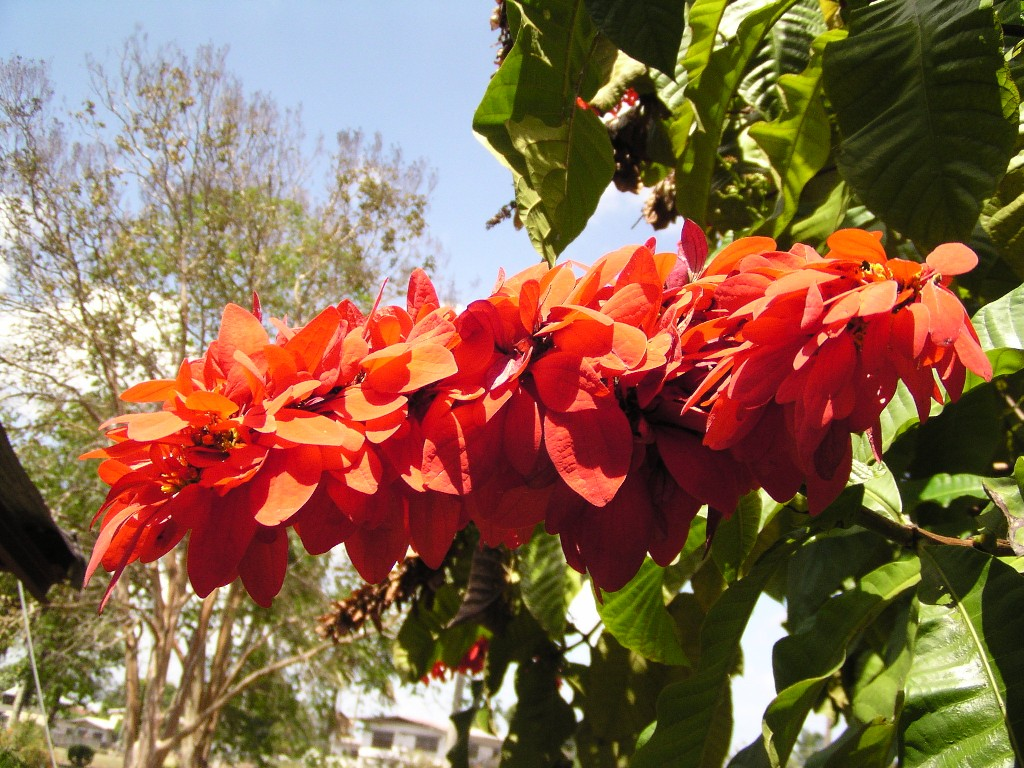
- Warszewiczia coccinea

Scientific classification
- Kingdom: Plantae
- Clade: Tracheophytes
- Clade: Angiosperms
- Clade: Eudicots
- Clade: Asterids
- Order: Gentianales
- Family: Rubiaceae
- Subfamily: Ixoroideae
- Tribe: Dialypetalantheae
- Genus: Warszewiczia; Klotzsch

Type species
- Warszewiczia coccinea (Vahl) Klotzsch

= Warszewiczia =

Genus of plants

Warszewiczia (or Warscewiczia) is a genus of flowering plants in the family Rubiaceae. They are primarily tropical Central and South American trees and shrubs. Perhaps the most famous member of the genus is W. coccinea (chaconia), which is the national flower of Trinidad and Tobago.

== Description ==
The inflorescences show leaf-shaped, bright-colored calycophylls, expanded foliaceous structures made from floral petaloids with enlarged showy calyx-lobes. Their main task is to attract pollinators.

== Taxonomy ==
This genus was named after Józef Warszewicz, a 19th-century Polish orchid collector and inspector of the botanic gardens in Kraków, Poland. Warszawa is also the Polish name for Warsaw – capital city of Poland.

== Species ==
- Warszewiczia ambigua Standl.
- Warszewiczia coccinea (Vahl) Klotzsch - Orangegold Chaconia, Wild Poinsettia
- Warszewiczia cordata Spruce ex K.Schum.
- Warszewiczia elata Ducke
- Warszewiczia longistaminea K.Schum.
- Warszewiczia peltata Wedd.
- Warszewiczia schwackei K.Schum.
- Warszewiczia uxpanapensis (Lorence) C.M.Taylor
