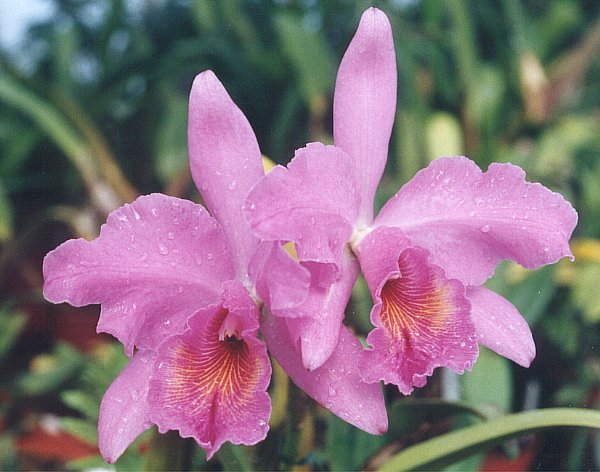

Scientific classification
- Kingdom: Plantae
- Clade: Tracheophytes
- Clade: Angiosperms
- Clade: Monocots
- Order: Asparagales
- Family: Orchidaceae
- Subfamily: Epidendroideae
- Genus: Cattleya
- Subgenus: Cattleya subg. Cattleya
- Section: Cattleya sect. Cattleya
- Species: C. warscewiczii

Binomial name
- Cattleya warscewiczii Rchb.f.

Synonyms
- Cattleya gigas Linden & André; Cattleya sanderiana H. Low, Gard. Chron.; Cattleya imperialis O'Brien; Cattleya gloriosa Carrière

= Cattleya warscewiczii =

Species of orchid

Cattleya warscewiczii (The "Warscewicz's Cattley's orchid"), a labiate Cattleya, is a species of orchid.

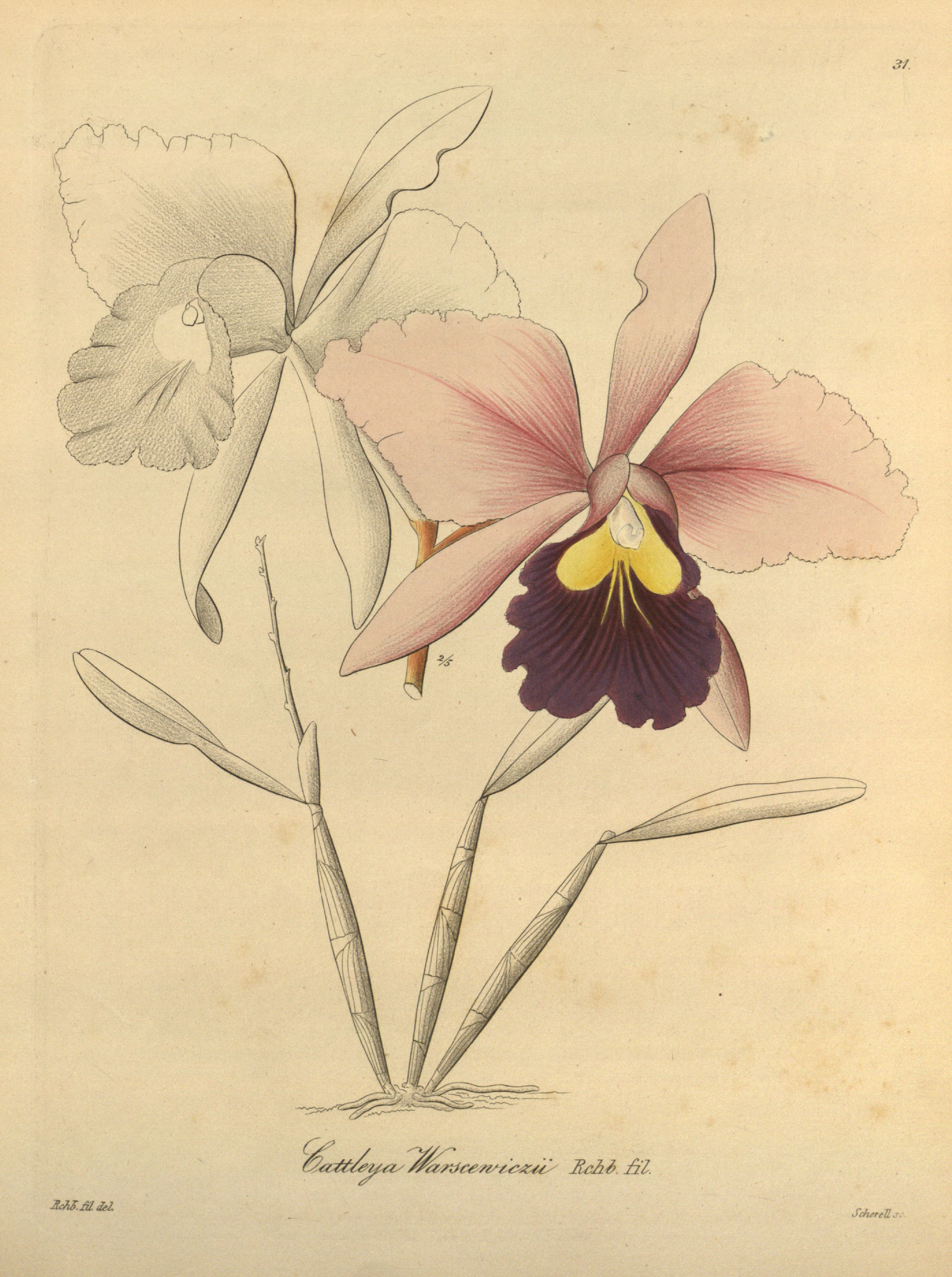
Drawing of C. warscewiczii in Xenia Orchidacea vol. 1, 1858

It was first collected by Józef Warszewicz in Colombia in 1848-49 and formally described by Heinrich Gustav Reichenbach in 1855. C. warscewiczii exhibits a typical Cattleya sympodial habit. Pseudobulbs are 8-16" (20-40 cm) long, unifoliate, cylindrical or cigar-shaped, grooved. Flowers are 7-11" (17.5-27.5 cm) across, largest in the genus, showy, fragrant. In culture the flowering is in summer on that year's spring growth. Strong light and good air movement are required.

The diploid chromosome number of C. warscewiczii has been determined as 2n = 40; the haploid chromosome number as n = 20.

C. warscewiczii hybridizes naturally with C. aurea / dowiana (Note: C. aurea has now been established to be a separate species from C. dowiana, but has occasionally been considered a subspecies in the past. C. aurea is a Colombian species, like C. warscewivzii, while C. dowiana is found in Costa Rica and Panama.), producing C. x hardyana. C. warscewiczii has also been used extensively in Cattleya hybridization, to produce large-flowered hybrid Cattleyas.
