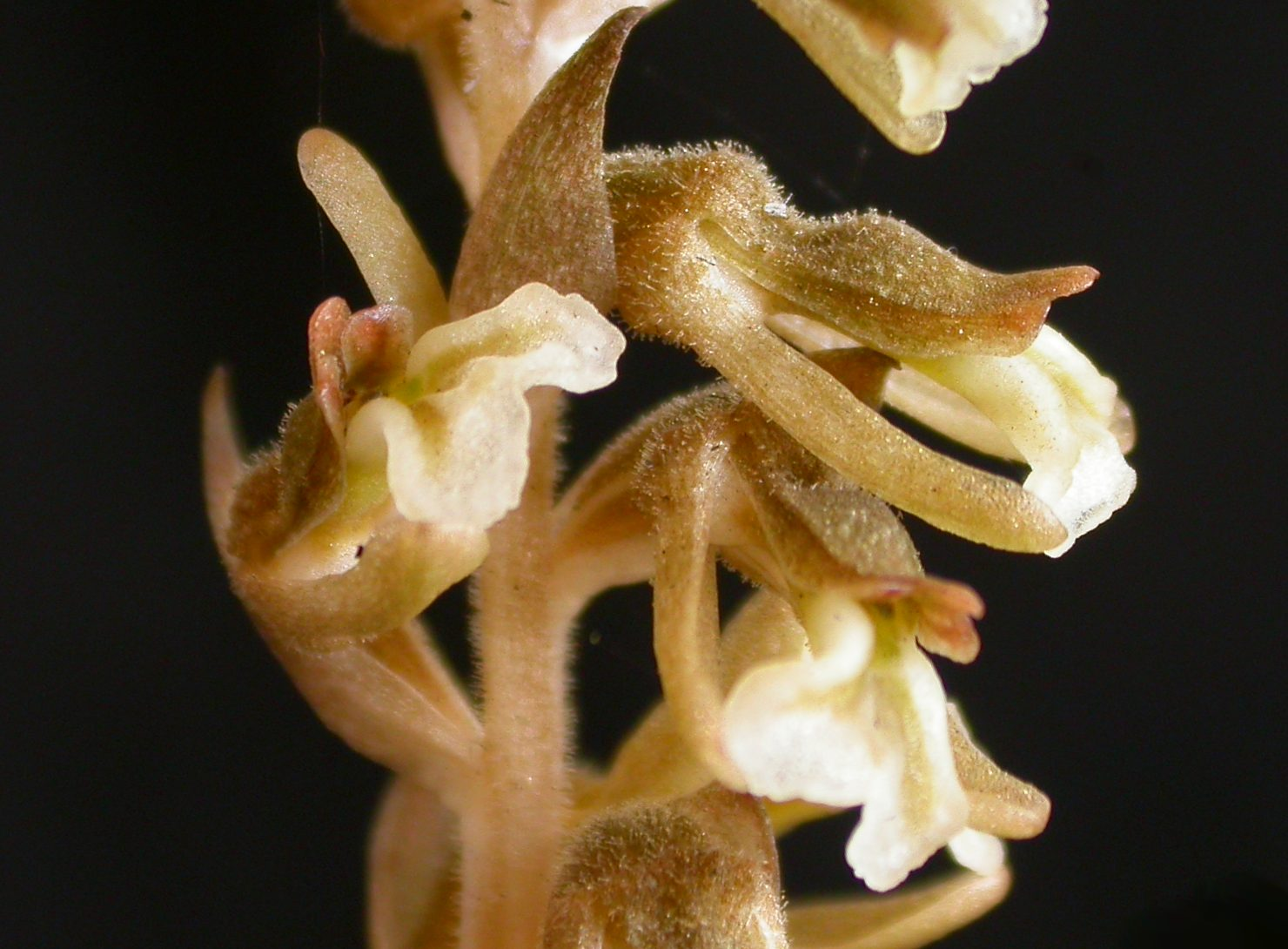

Conservation status
- Least Concern (IUCN 3.1)

- Apparently Secure (NatureServe)

Scientific classification
- Kingdom: Plantae
- Clade: Tracheophytes
- Clade: Angiosperms
- Clade: Monocots
- Order: Asparagales
- Family: Orchidaceae
- Subfamily: Orchidoideae
- Tribe: Cranichideae
- Genus: Cyclopogon
- Species: C. elatus

Binomial name
- Cyclopogon elatus (Sw.) Schltr.

Synonyms
- Satyrium elatum Sw.; Neottia elata (Sw.) Sw.; Ibidium elatum (Sw.) Salisb.; Spiranthes elata (Sw.) Rich.; Sauroglossum richardii Ames; Beadlea elata (Sw.) Small ex Britton; Neottia minor Jacq.; Spiranthes elata var. humilis Rchb.f.; Gyrostachys haenkeana Kuntze; Gyrostachys minor (Jacq.) Kuntze; Spiranthes elata var. foliosa Cogn. in C.F.P.von Martius; Spiranthes elata var. longipetiolata Cogn. in C.F.P.von Martius; Spiranthes elata var. minutiflora Cogn. in C.F.P.von Martius; Spiranthes elata var. ovata Cogn. in C.F.P.von Martius; Spiranthes elata var. parvifolia Cogn. in C.F.P.von Martius; Cyclopogon densiflorus Schltr.

= Cyclopogon elatus =

Species of orchid

Cyclopogon elatus is a species of terrestrial orchids, commonly known as Juan Ascencio or tall Neottia. It is widespread across much of Latin America from Mexico and Belize to Argentina, as well as in the West Indies and southern Florida.
