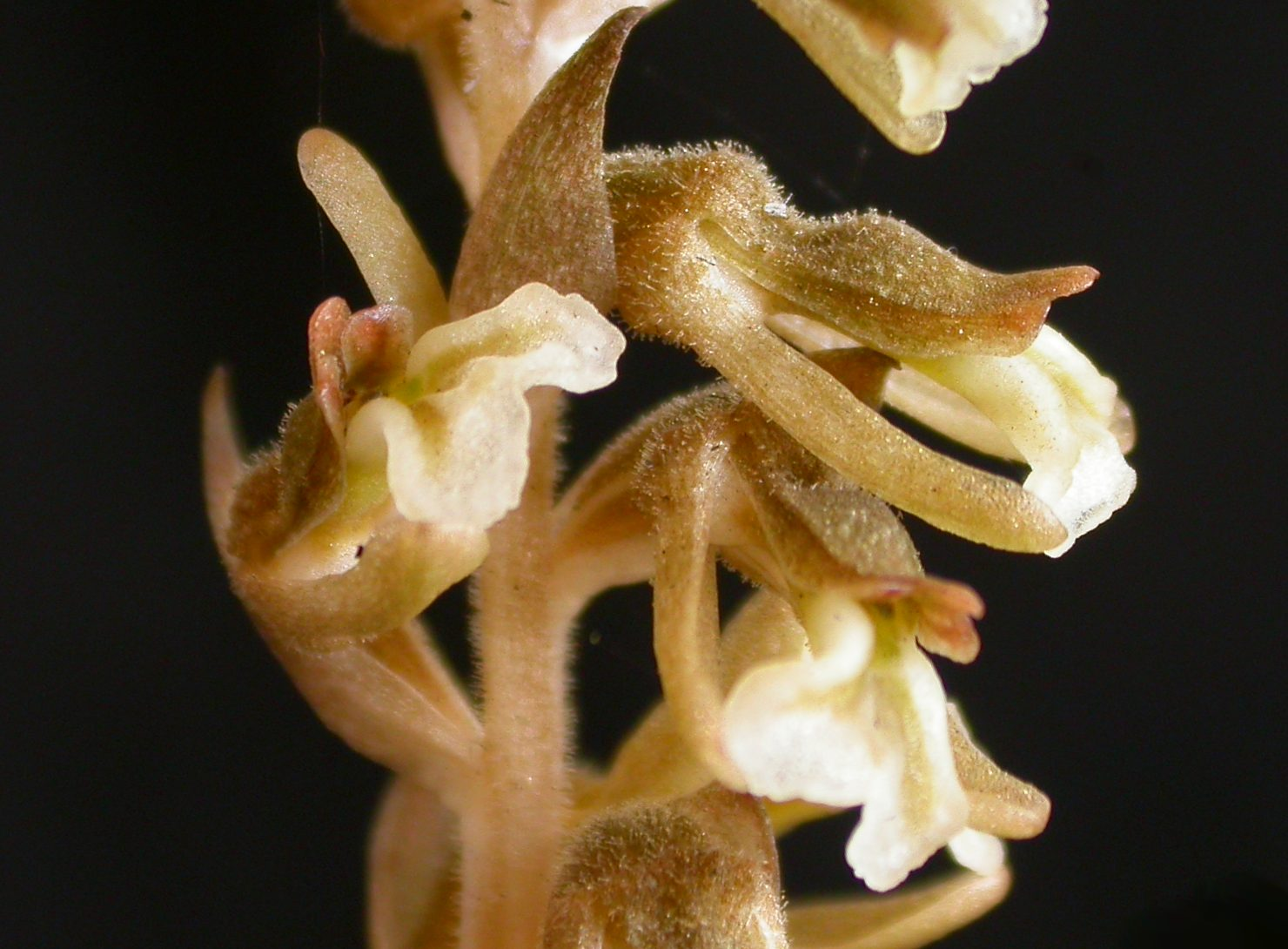
- Cyclopogon elatus

Scientific classification
- Kingdom: Plantae
- Clade: Tracheophytes
- Clade: Angiosperms
- Clade: Monocots
- Order: Asparagales
- Family: Orchidaceae
- Subfamily: Orchidoideae
- Tribe: Cranichideae
- Subtribe: Spiranthinae
- Genus: Cyclopogon; C.Presl (1827)

Synonyms
- Beadlea Small; Stigmatosema Garay; Cocleorchis Szlach.; Warscaea Szlach.

= Cyclopogon =

Genus of orchids

Cyclopogon is a genus of flowering plants from the orchid family, Orchidaceae. It is a fairly large genus distributed widely over much of South America, the Galápagos, Central America, Mexico and the West Indies, with 2 species (C. elatus + C. cranichoides) in southern Florida.

== Species ==
1. Cyclopogon adhaesus Szlach.
2. Cyclopogon alexandrae (Kraenzl.) Schltr.
3. Cyclopogon aphyllus Schltr.
4. Cyclopogon apricus (Lindl.) Schltr.
5. Cyclopogon argyrifolius (Barb.Rodr.) Barb.Rodr.
6. Cyclopogon argyrotaenius Schltr.
7. Cyclopogon bangii (Rolfe ex Rusby) Schltr.
8. Cyclopogon bicolor (Ker Gawl.) Schltr.
9. Cyclopogon bidentatus (Barb.Rodr.) Szlach.
10. Cyclopogon calophyllus (Barb.Rodr.) Barb.Rodr.
11. Cyclopogon casanaensis Schltr.
12. Cyclopogon cearensis Barb.Rodr.
13. Cyclopogon comosus (Rchb.f.) Burns-Bal. & E.W.Greenw.
14. Cyclopogon condoranus Dodson
15. Cyclopogon congestus (Vell.) Hoehne
16. Cyclopogon cranichoides (Griseb.) Schltr.
17. Cyclopogon deminkiorum Burns-Bal. & M.S.Foster
18. Cyclopogon dressleri Szlach.
19. Cyclopogon dusenii Schltr.
20. Cyclopogon dutrae Schltr.
21. Cyclopogon elatus (Sw.) Schltr.
22. Cyclopogon eldorado (Linden & Rchb.f.) Schltr.
23. Cyclopogon elegans Hoehne
24. Cyclopogon ellipticus (Garay) Dodson
25. Cyclopogon epiphyticus (Dodson) Dodson
26. Cyclopogon estradae Dodson
27. Cyclopogon eugenii (Rchb.f. & Warm.) Schltr.
28. Cyclopogon gardneri Mytnik, Szlach. & Rutk.
29. Cyclopogon glabrescens (T.Hashim.) Dodson, Brako & Zarucchi
30. Cyclopogon goodyeroides (Schltr.) Schltr.
31. Cyclopogon gracilis Schltr.
32. Cyclopogon graciliscapus Schltr.
33. Cyclopogon hatschbachii Schltr.
34. Cyclopogon hennisianus (Sandt) Szlach.
35. Cyclopogon hirtzii Dodson
36. Cyclopogon iguapensis Schltr.
37. Cyclopogon inaequilaterus (Poepp. & Endl.) Schltr.
38. Cyclopogon itatiaiensis (Kraenzl.) Hoehne
39. Cyclopogon laxiflorus Ekman & Mansf.
40. Cyclopogon lindleyanus (Link, Klotzsch & Otto) Schltr.
41. Cyclopogon longibracteatus (Barb.Rodr.) Schltr.
42. Cyclopogon luerorum Dodson
43. Cyclopogon luteoalbus (A.Rich. & Galeotti) Schltr.
44. Cyclopogon macer Schltr.
45. Cyclopogon maldonadoanus Dodson
46. Cyclopogon millei (Schltr.) Schltr.
47. Cyclopogon miradorensis Schltr.
48. Cyclopogon monophyllus (Lindl.) Schltr.
49. Cyclopogon multiflorus Schltr.
50. Cyclopogon obliquus (J.J.Sm.) Szlach.
51. Cyclopogon oliganthus (Hoehne) Hoehne & Schltr.
52. Cyclopogon olivaceus (Rolfe) Schltr.
53. Cyclopogon ovalifolius C.Presl
54. Cyclopogon paludosus (Cogn.) Schltr.
55. Cyclopogon papilio Szlach.
56. Cyclopogon pelagalloanus Dodson
57. Cyclopogon peruvianus (C.Presl) Schltr.
58. Cyclopogon plantagineus Schltr.
59. Cyclopogon prasophylloides (Garay) Szlach.
60. Cyclopogon prasophyllus (Rchb.f.) Schltr.
61. Cyclopogon pringlei (S.Watson) Soto Arenas
62. Cyclopogon proboscideus Szlach.
63. Cyclopogon pululahuanus Dodson
64. Cyclopogon rimbachii Schltr.
65. Cyclopogon rotundifolius (Cogn.) Schltr.
66. Cyclopogon saccatus (A.Rich. & Galeotti) Schltr.
67. Cyclopogon sillarensis Dodson & R.Vásquez
68. Cyclopogon stenoglossus Pabst
69. Cyclopogon subalpestris Schltr.
70. Cyclopogon tandapianus Dodson
71. Cyclopogon taquaremboensis (Barb.Rodr.) Schltr.
72. Cyclopogon torusus Mytnik, Szlach. & Rutk.
73. Cyclopogon trifasciatus Schltr.
74. Cyclopogon truncatus (Lindl.) Schltr.
75. Cyclopogon variegatus Barb.Rodr.
76. Cyclopogon venustus (Barb.Rodr.) Schltr.
77. Cyclopogon vittatus Dutra ex Pabst
78. Cyclopogon warmingii (Rchb.f.) Schltr.
79. Cyclopogon werffii Dodson
80. Cyclopogon williamsii Dodson & R.Vásquez

== See also ==
- List of Orchidaceae genera
