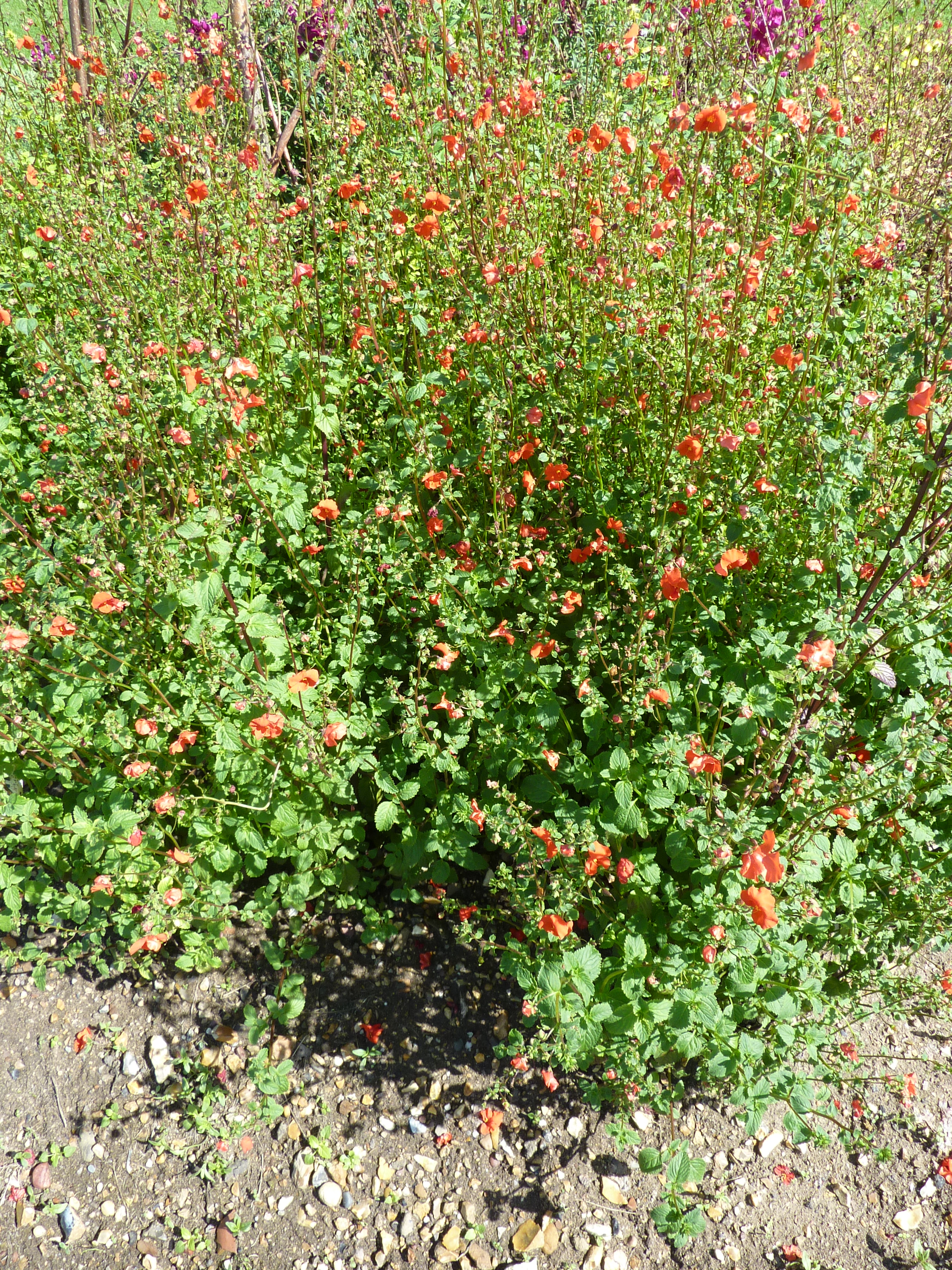

Scientific classification
- Kingdom: Plantae
- Clade: Tracheophytes
- Clade: Angiosperms
- Clade: Eudicots
- Clade: Asterids
- Order: Lamiales
- Family: Scrophulariaceae
- Genus: Alonsoa
- Species: A. meridionalis

Binomial name
- Alonsoa meridionalis Kuntze

= Alonsoa meridionalis =

Species of flowering plant

Alonsoa meridionalis (syn. Alonsoa grandiflora, Alonsoa incisifolia and Alonsoa warscewiczii), is an ornamental plant in the family Scrophulariaceae.

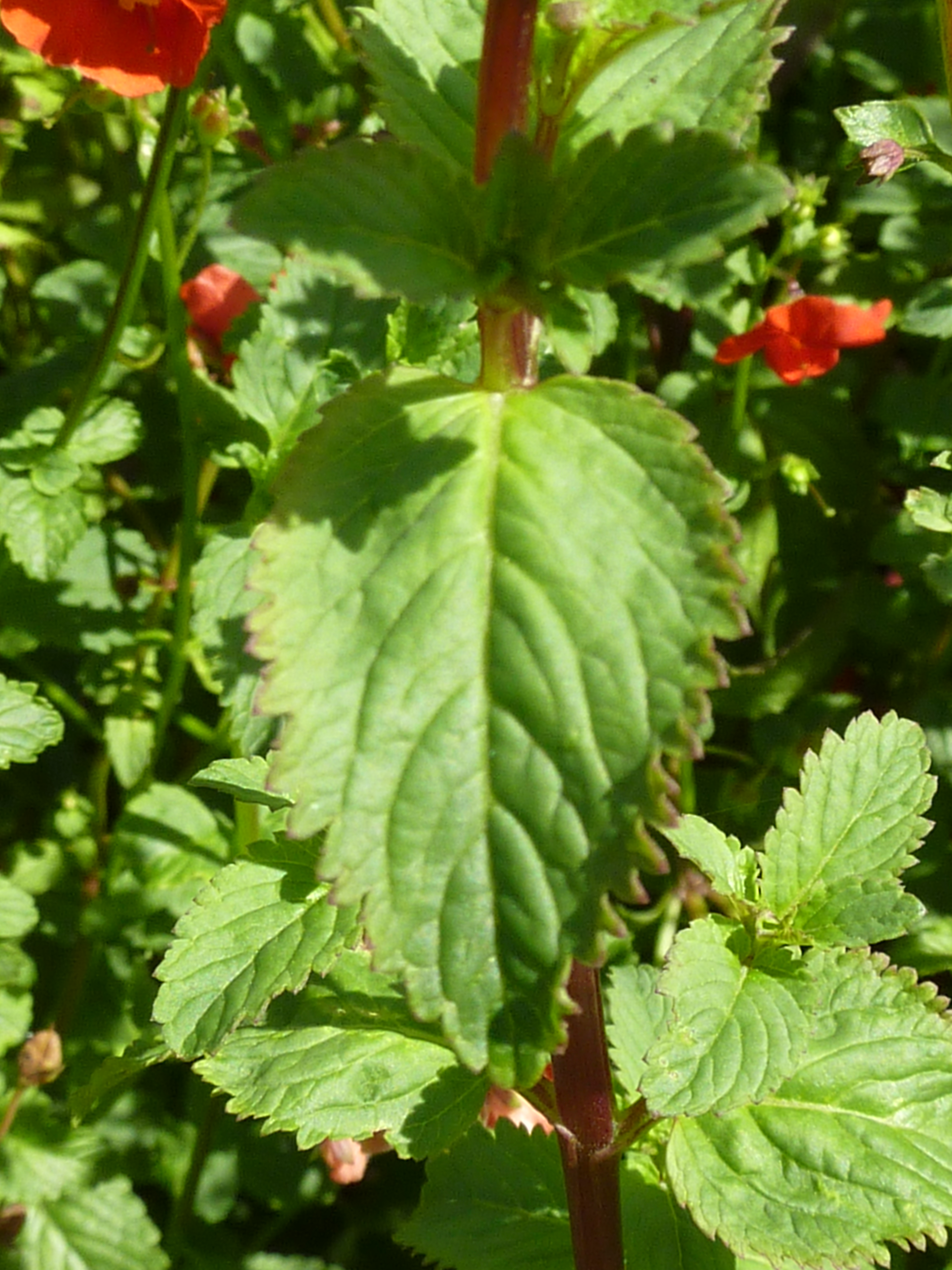
Leaves
