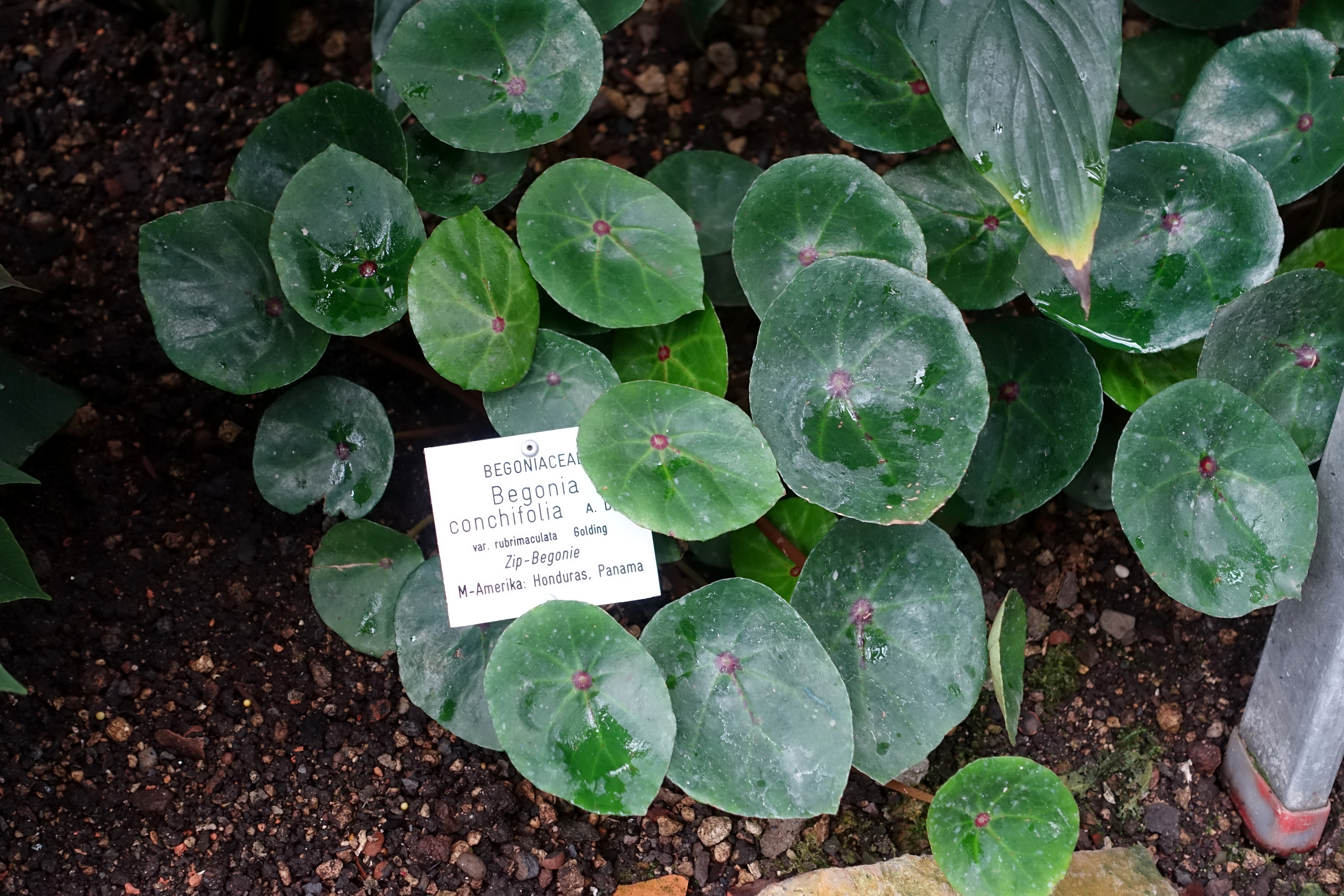
- At the Botanical Garden of the University of Heidelberg
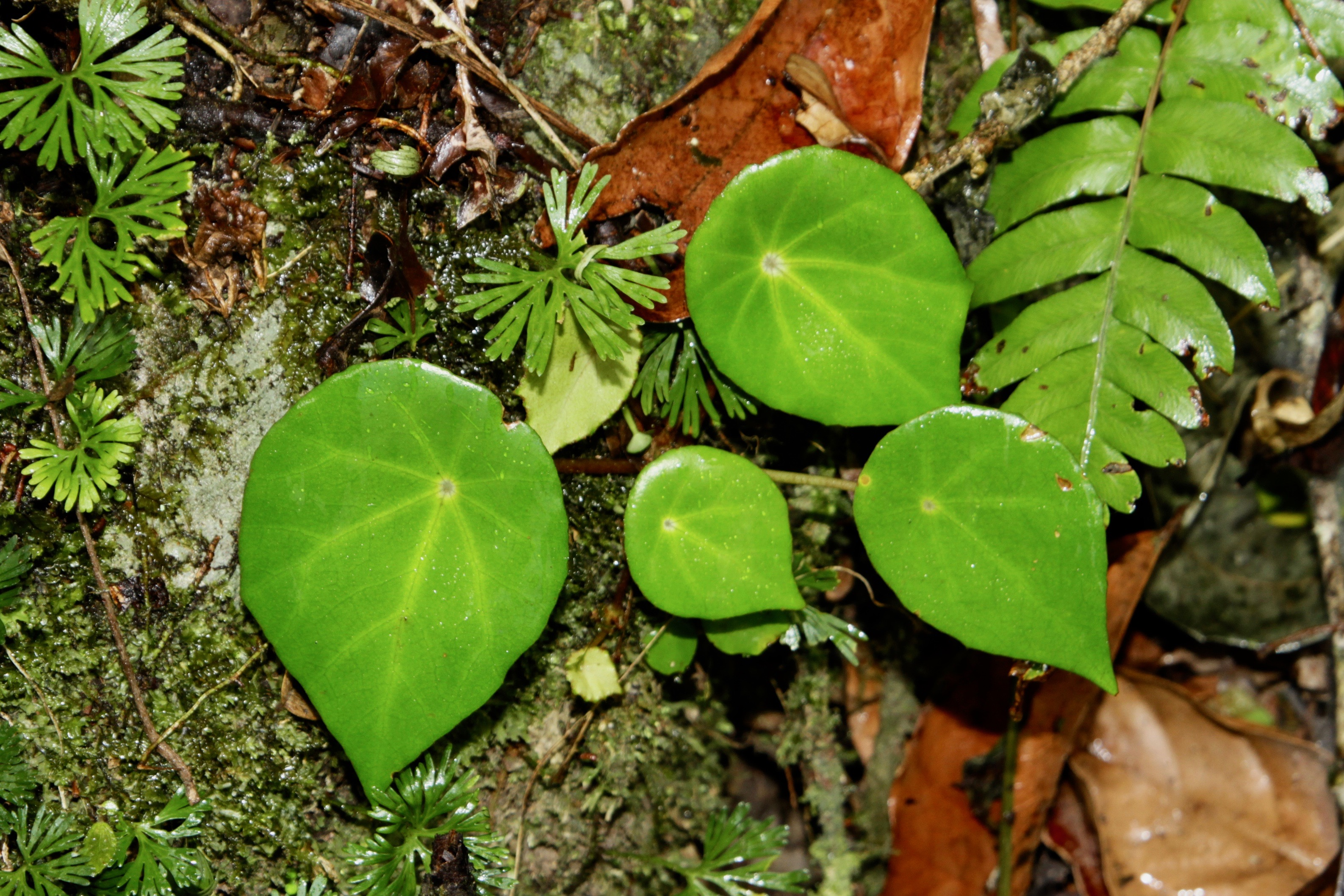
- In the wild on Cerro Gaital massif in Panama

Scientific classification
- Kingdom: Plantae
- Clade: Tracheophytes
- Clade: Angiosperms
- Clade: Eudicots
- Clade: Rosids
- Order: Cucurbitales
- Family: Begoniaceae
- Genus: Begonia
- Species: B. conchifolia

Binomial name
- Begonia conchifolia A.Dietr.

Synonyms
- List: Begonia conchifolia var. rubrimacula Golding; Begonia conchifolia f. rubrimacula (Golding) Tebbitt; Begonia pumilio Standl.; Begonia scutellata Liebm.; Begonia warscewiczii Neumann; Begonia warscewitzii Hérincq; Gireoudia conchifolia (A.Dietr.) Klotzsch; Gireoudia conchifolia var. scutellata (Liebm.) Klotzsch; Gireoudia warscewicziana A.DC.

= Begonia conchifolia =

Species of flowering plant

Begonia conchifolia, the zip begonia, is a species of flowering plant in the family Begoniaceae. It is native to Central America; El Salvador, Costa Rica and Panama. As a houseplant it does best out of direct sunlight. 'Red Ruby' is the best known cultivar.
