= List of Encyclia species =

Encyclia is an orchid genus with about 170 species. It belongs to the subfamily Epidendroideae of the orchid family (Orchidaceae).

The type species is Encyclia viridiflora Hook., Bot. Mag. 55: t. 2831 (1828).

As of December 2023, Plants of the World Online accepted the following species and natural hybrids:

| Image | Name | Distribution | Elevation (m) |
|---|---|---|---|
| | Encyclia acapulcensis Viccon, Cetzal & Carnevali | | |
| | Encyclia acutifolia Schltr. | | |
| | Encyclia adenocarpos (Lex.) Schltr. | | |
| | Encyclia adenocaula (Lex.) Schltr. | | |
| | Encyclia advena (Rchb.f.) Porto & Brade | | |
| | Encyclia aenicta Dressler & G.E.Pollard | | |
| | Encyclia alata (Bateman) Schltr. | | |
| | Encyclia albopurpurea (Barb.Rodr.) Porto & Brade | | |
| | Encyclia alboxanthina Fowlie | | |
| | Encyclia altissima Schltr. | | |
| | Encyclia amazonica Brongn. ex Neumann | | |
| | Encyclia ambigua (Lindl.) Schltr. | | |
| | Encyclia andrichii L.C.Menezes | | |
| | Encyclia androsiana Sauleda | | |
| | Encyclia angustifolia (Sw.) Schltr. | | |
| | Encyclia angustiloba Schltr. | | |
| | Encyclia archilarum W.E.Higgins | | |
| | Encyclia argentinensis (Speg.) Hoehne | | |
| | Encyclia aspera (Lindl.) Schltr. | | |
| | Encyclia asperula Dressler & G.E.Pollard | | |
| | Encyclia atrorubens (Rolfe) Schltr. | | |
| | Encyclia auyantepuiensis Carnevali & I.Ramírez | | |
| | Encyclia belizensis (Rchb.f.) Schltr. | | |
| | Encyclia betancourtiana Carnevali & I.Ramírez | | |
| | Encyclia bicalhoi V.P.Castro & Bohnke | | |
| | Encyclia bipapularis (Rchb.f.) Acuña | | |
| | Encyclia bocourtii Múj.Benítez & Pupulin | | |
| | Encyclia bohnkiana V.P.Castro & Campacci | | |
| | Encyclia bracteata Schltr. ex Hoehne | | |
| | Encyclia bractescens (Lindl.) Hoehne | | |
| | Encyclia bradfordii (Griseb.) Carnevali & I.Ramírez | | |
| | Encyclia bragancae Ruschi | | |
| | Encyclia caicensis Sauleda & R.M.Adams | | |
| | Encyclia cajalbanensis Múj.Benítez, Bocourt & Pupulin | | |
| | Encyclia calderoniae Soto Arenas | | |
| | Encyclia candollei (Lindl.) Schltr. | | |
| | Encyclia ceratistes (Lindl.) Schltr. | | |
| | Encyclia chapadensis L.C.Menezes | | |
| | Encyclia chiapasensis Withner & D.G.Hunt | | |
| | Encyclia chloroleuca (Hook.) Neumann | | |
| | Encyclia conchaechila (Barb.Rodr.) Porto & Brade | | |
| | Encyclia contrerasii R.González | | |
| | Encyclia cordigera (Kunth) Dressler | | |
| | Encyclia correllii Sauleda | | |
| | Encyclia cyperifolia (C.Schweinf.) Carnevali & I.Ramírez | | |
| | Encyclia davidhuntii Withner & M.Fuente | | |
| | Encyclia delacruzii W.E.Higgins & Archila | | |
| | Encyclia dichroma (Lindl.) Schltr. | | |
| | Encyclia dickinsoniana (Withner) Hamer | | |
| | Encyclia diota (Lindl.) Schltr. | | |
| | Encyclia diurna (Jacq.) Schltr. | | |
| | Encyclia dressleri Beutelsp. & Mor.-Mol. | | |
| | Encyclia duveenii Pabst | | |
| | Encyclia elegantula Dressler | | |
| | Encyclia enriquearcilae Carnevali & Cetzal | | |
| | Encyclia fehlingii (Sauleda) Sauleda & R.M.Adams | | |
| | Encyclia ferreirae Campacci & J.B.F.Silva | | |
| | Encyclia fimbriata C.A.Bastos, Van den Berg & Meneguzzo | | |
| | Encyclia flabellata (Lindl.) B.F.Thurst. & W.R.Thurst. | | |
| | Encyclia fowliei Duveen | | |
| | Encyclia fucata (Lindl.) Schltr. | | |
| | Encyclia gallopavina (Rchb.f.) Porto & Brade | | |
| | Encyclia garciae-esquivelii Carnevali & I.Ramírez | | |
| | Encyclia gonzalezii L.C.Menezes | | |
| | Encyclia grahamii (Hook.) Bosmenier, Esperon & Sauleda | | |
| | Encyclia granitica (Lindl.) Schltr. | | |
| | Encyclia gravida (Lindl.) Schltr. | | |
| | Encyclia grisebachiana (Cogn.) Acuña | | |
| | Encyclia guadalupeae R.González & Alvarado | | |
| | Encyclia guanahacabibensis Sauleda & Esperon | | |
| | Encyclia guatemalensis (Klotzsch) Dressler & G.E.Pollard | | |
| | Encyclia guentheriana (Kraenzl.) R.Vásquez | | |
| | Encyclia guianensis Carnevali & G.A.Romero | | |
| | Encyclia halbingeriana Hágsater & Soto Arenas | | |
| | Encyclia hamiltonii Sauleda & Esperon | | |
| | Encyclia hanburyi (Lindl.) Schltr. | | |
| | Encyclia havanensis O.Bello, Esperon & Sauleda | | |
| | Encyclia hermentiana Brongn. ex Neumann | | |
| | Encyclia holguinensis Soto Calvo, Esperon & Sauleda | | |
| | Encyclia howardii (Ames & Correll) Hoehne | | |
| | Encyclia huertae Soto Arenas & R.Jiménez | | |
| | Encyclia ibanezii Archila & W.E.Higgins | | |
| | Encyclia inaguensis Nash ex Britton & Millsp. | | |
| | Encyclia incumbens (Lindl.) Mabb. | | |
| | Encyclia inopinata Leopardi, Carnevali & G.A.Romero | | |
| | Encyclia ionosma (Lindl.) Schltr. | | |
| | Encyclia isochila (Rchb.f.) Dod | | |
| | Encyclia ivoniae Carnevali & G.A.Romero | | |
| | Encyclia jenischiana (Rchb.f.) Porto & Brade | | |
| | Encyclia joaosaiana Campacci & Bohnke | | |
| | Encyclia kennedyi (Fowlie & Withner) Hágsater | | |
| | Encyclia kermesina (Lindl.) P.Ortiz | | |
| | Encyclia kingsii (C.D.Adams) Nir | | |
| | Encyclia leucantha Schltr. | | |
| | Encyclia linearifolioides (Kraenzl.) Hoehne | | |
| | Encyclia lineariloba Withner | | |
| | Encyclia lopezii Leopardi & Carnevali | | |
| | Encyclia lorata Dressler & G.E.Pollard | | |
| | Encyclia mapuerae (Huber) Brade & Pabst | | |
| | Encyclia maravalensis Withner | | |
| | Encyclia meliosma (Rchb.f.) Schltr. | | |
| | Encyclia microbulbon (Hook.) Schltr. | | |
| | Encyclia microtos (Rchb.f.) Hoehne | | |
| | Encyclia moebusii H.Dietr. | | |
| | Encyclia monteverdensis M.A.Díaz & Ackerman | | |
| | Encyclia mooreana (Rolfe) Schltr. | | |
| | Encyclia naranjapatensis Dodson | | |
| | Encyclia navarroi Vale & D.Rojas | | |
| | Encyclia nematocaulon (A.Rich.) Acuña | | |
| | Encyclia obtusa (A.DC.) Schltr. | | |
| | Encyclia ochrantha (A.Rich.) Withner | | |
| | Encyclia oestlundii (Ames, F.T.Hubb. & C.Schweinf.) Hágsater & Stermitz | | |
| | Encyclia oliveirana Campacci | | |
| | Encyclia oncidioides (Lindl.) Schltr. | | |
| | Encyclia osmantha (Barb.Rodr.) Schltr. | | |
| | Encyclia ossenbachiana Pupulin | | |
| | Encyclia oxypetala (Lindl.) Schltr. | | |
| | Encyclia oxyphylla Schltr. | | |
| | Encyclia pachyantha (Lindl.) Hoehne | | |
| | Encyclia papillosa (Bateman ex Lindl.) Aguirre-Olav. | | |
| | Encyclia parallela (Lindl.) P.Ortiz | | |
| | Encyclia parkeri Reina-Rodr. & Leopardi | | |
| | Encyclia parviflora (Regel) Withner | | |
| | Encyclia parviloba (Fawc. & Rendle) Nir | | |
| | Encyclia patens Hook. | | |
| | Encyclia patriciana (J.S.Moreno & Campacci) J.M.H.Shaw | | |
| | Encyclia pauciflora (Barb.Rodr.) Porto & Brade | | |
| | Encyclia peraltensis (Ames) Dressler | | |
| | Encyclia perplexa (Ames, F.T.Hubb. & C.Schweinf.) Dressler & G.E.Pollard | | |
| | Encyclia phoenicea (Lindl.) Neumann | | |
| | Encyclia picta (Lindl.) Hoehne | | |
| | Encyclia pilosa (C.Schweinf.) Carnevali & I.Ramírez | | |
| | Encyclia plicata (Lindl.) Schltr. | | |
| | Encyclia pollardiana (Withner) Dressler & G.E.Pollard | | |
| | Encyclia profusa (Rolfe) Dressler & G.E.Pollard | | |
| | Encyclia pyriformis (Lindl.) Schltr. | | |
| | Encyclia randii (L.Linden & Rodigas) Porto & Brade | | |
| | Encyclia recurvata Schltr. | | |
| | Encyclia remotiflora (C.Schweinf.) Carnevali & I.Ramírez | | |
| | Encyclia replicata (Lindl. & Paxton) Schltr. | | |
| | Encyclia richardiana Rodr.Seijo, Esperon & Sauleda | | |
| | Encyclia rodolfoi Archila, Chiron & Véliz | | |
| | Encyclia rosariensis Múj.Benítez, R.Pérez & Pupulin | | |
| | Encyclia rufa (Lindl.) Britton & Millsp. | | |
| | Encyclia rzedowskiana Soto Arenas | | |
| | Encyclia sabanensis Vale, Pérez-Obr. & Faife | | |
| | Encyclia sagrana (A.Rich.) Soto Calvo, Esperon & Sauleda | | |
| | Encyclia sclerocladia (Lindl.) Hoehne | | |
| | Encyclia seidelii Pabst | | |
| | Encyclia selligera (Bateman ex Lindl.) Schltr. | | |
| | Encyclia silverarum Leopardi & Carnevali | | |
| | Encyclia spatella (Rchb.f.) Schltr. | | |
| | Encyclia spiritusanctensis L.C.Menezes | | |
| | Encyclia steinbachii Schltr. | | |
| | Encyclia stellata (Lindl.) Schltr. | | |
| | Encyclia suaveolens Dressler | | |
| | Encyclia tampensis (Lindl.) Small | | |
| | Encyclia thienii Dodson | | |
| | Encyclia thrombodes (Rchb.f.) Schltr. | | |
| | Encyclia trachycarpa (Lindl.) Schltr. | | |
| | Encyclia trachychila (Lindl.) Schltr. | | |
| | Encyclia trautmannii Senghas | | |
| | Encyclia triangulifera (Rchb.f.) Acuña | | |
| | Encyclia tuerckheimii Schltr. | | |
| | Encyclia unaensis Fowlie | | |
| | Encyclia uxpanapensis Salazar | | |
| | Encyclia viridiflora Hook. | | |
| | Encyclia withneri (Sauleda) Sauleda & R.M.Adams | | |
| | Encyclia xerophytica Pabst | | |
| | Encyclia xipheres (Rchb.f.) Schltr. | | |
| | Encyclia yauaperyensis (Barb.Rodr.) Porto & Brade | | |

== Natural hybrids ==
- Encyclia × adamsii Sauleda
- Encyclia × alcardoi V.P.Castro & Chiron) (Encyclia argentinensis × Encyclia flava)
- Encyclia × bajamarensis Sauleda & R.M.Adams (Encyclia gracilis × Encyclia rufa)
- Encyclia × breueriana V.P.Castro & Speckm.
- Encyclia × camagueyensis Rodr.Seijo, Gonz.Estév., Sauleda, Risco Vill. & Esperon
- Encyclia × carbonitensis Campacci
- Encyclia × celiamirandae Campacci & G.F.Carr
- Encyclia × cordistes Sauleda
- Encyclia × darieniana Esperon & Sauleda
- Encyclia × esperonii Rodr.Seijo & Sauleda
- Encyclia × fabianae B.P.Faria, A.D.Santana & Péres Junior
- Encyclia × gracilis (Lindl.) Schltr.
- Encyclia × guzinskii Sauleda & R.M.Adams (Encyclia altissima × Encyclia plicata)
- Encyclia × hillyerorum Sauleda & R.M.Adams (Encyclia fehlingii × Encyclia fucata)
- Encyclia × jequitinhonhensis Campacci & Bohnke
- Encyclia × jezuinae Campacci & G.F.Carr
- Encyclia × knowlesii Sauleda & R.M.Adams (Encyclia fehlingii × Encyclia plicata)
- Encyclia × lleidae Sauleda & R.M.Adams (Encyclia gracilis × Encyclia plicata)
- Encyclia × nizanburyi Pérez-García & Hágsater
- Encyclia × nizandensis Pérez-García & Hágsater
- Encyclia × osmentii Sauleda & Esperon
- Encyclia × padreortizii Sauleda
- Encyclia × raganii Sauleda & R.M.Adams (Encyclia altissima × Encyclia gracilis)
- Encyclia × verboonenii V.P.Castro & Campacci
