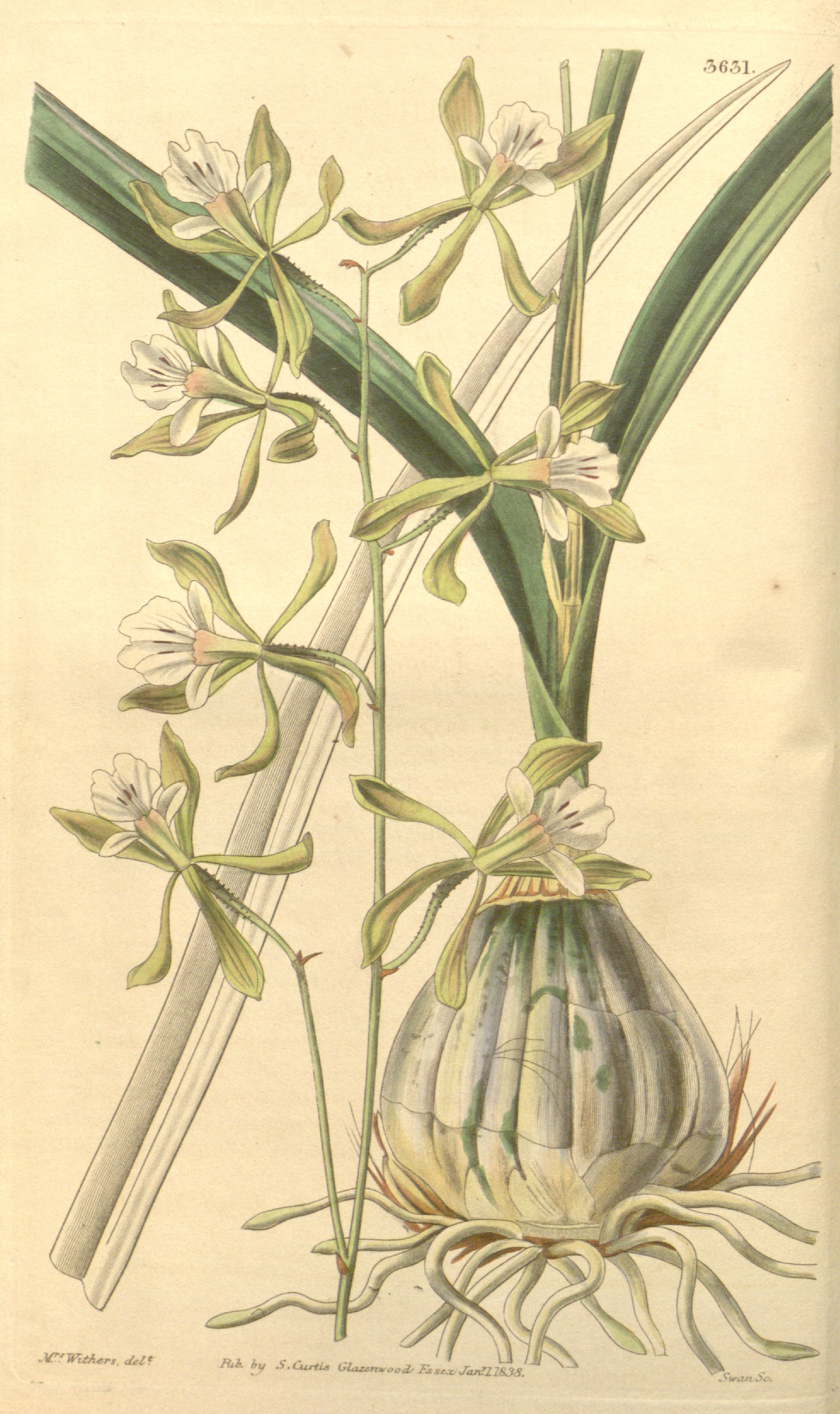

Scientific classification
- Kingdom: Plantae
- Clade: Tracheophytes
- Clade: Angiosperms
- Clade: Monocots
- Order: Asparagales
- Family: Orchidaceae
- Subfamily: Epidendroideae
- Genus: Encyclia
- Species: E. adenocarpa

Binomial name
- Encyclia adenocarpa (Lex.) Schltr.

Synonyms
- Encyclia adenocarpon La Llave & Lex. Schltr; Encyclia papillosa Bateman ex Lindl. Aguirre-Olav.; Epidendrum adenocarpon Lex.; Epidendrum adenocarpon var. rosei Ames F.T.Hubb. & C.Schweinf.; Epidendrum crispatum Knowles & Westc.; Epidendrum papillosum Bateman ex Lindl.

= Encyclia adenocarpa =

Species of orchid

Encyclia adenocarpa is a species of orchid.
