= Epidendrum alatum =

The binomial Epidendrum alatum refers to:

- Epidendrum alatum Bateman, a synonym of Encyclia alata
- Epidendrum alatum Lindl., a synonym of Encyclia ambigua
