= Diurna =

Diurna is a Latin & Italian word relating to 'day'. Sometimes refers to:

- Acta Diurna ('Daily Acts'), the newspaper of Rome, recording legal matters & public news of the Republic & Empire
- Encyclia diurna, a species of orchid
