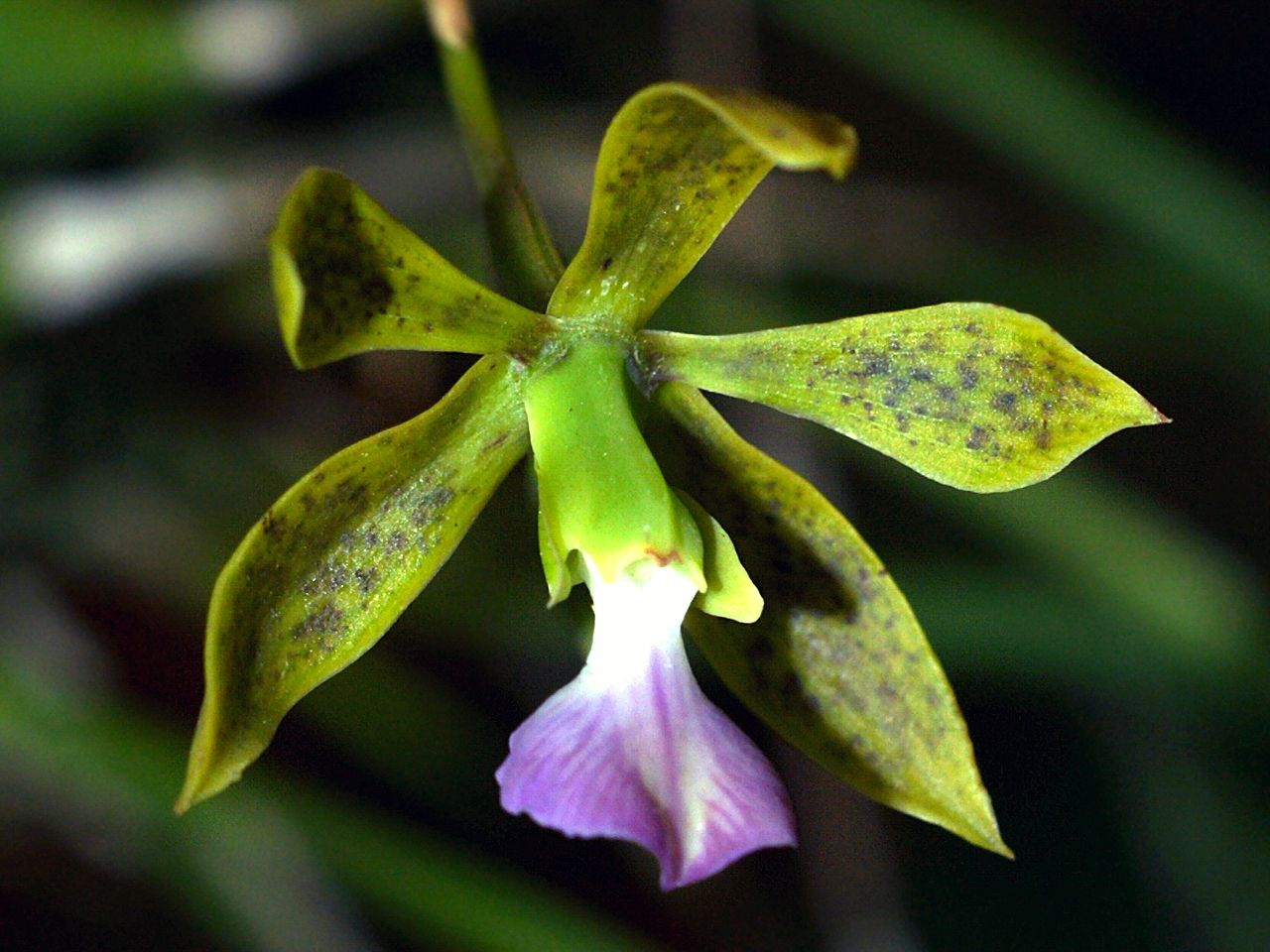

Scientific classification
- Kingdom: Plantae
- Clade: Tracheophytes
- Clade: Angiosperms
- Clade: Monocots
- Order: Asparagales
- Family: Orchidaceae
- Subfamily: Epidendroideae
- Genus: Encyclia
- Species: E. bracteata

Binomial name
- Encyclia bracteata Schltr. ex Hoehne

Synonyms
- Epidendrum bracteatum Barb.Rodr. (Basionym); Epidendrum pusillum Rolfe; Epidendrum pabstii A.D. Hawkes

= Encyclia bracteata =

Species of orchid

Encyclia bracteata is a species of orchid.
