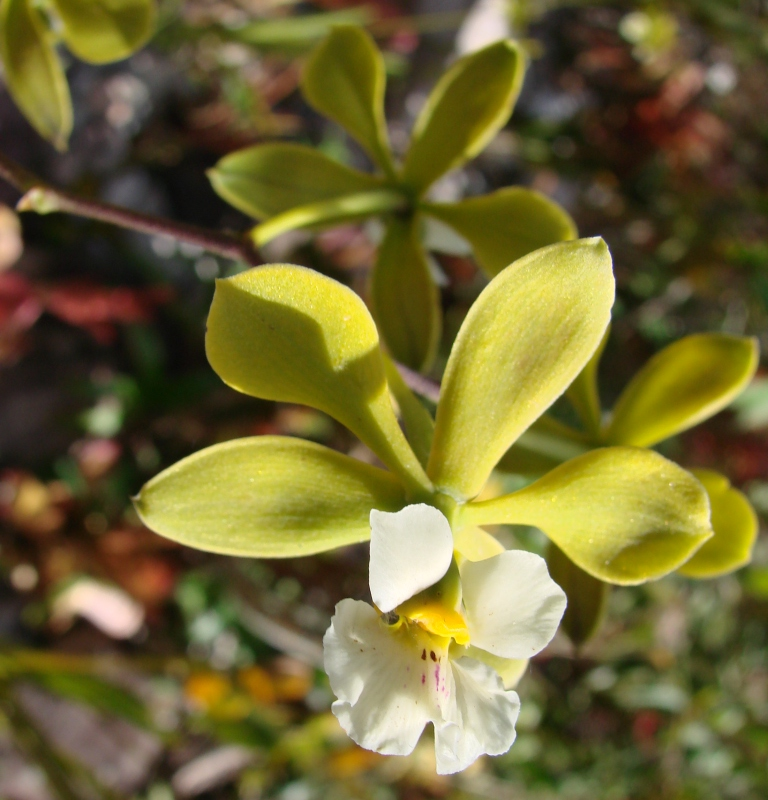

Scientific classification
- Kingdom: Plantae
- Clade: Tracheophytes
- Clade: Angiosperms
- Clade: Monocots
- Order: Asparagales
- Family: Orchidaceae
- Subfamily: Epidendroideae
- Genus: Encyclia
- Species: E. alboxanthina

Binomial name
- Encyclia alboxanthina Fowlie (1990)

= Encyclia alboxanthina =

Species of orchid

Encyclia alboxanthina is a species of orchid.
