= Encyclia linearifolioides =

Scientific classification
- Kingdom: Plantae
- Clade: Tracheophytes
- Clade: Angiosperms
- Clade: Monocots
- Order: Asparagales
- Family: Orchidaceae
- Subfamily: Epidendroideae
- Genus: Encyclia
- Species: E. linearifolioides

Binomial name
- Encyclia linearifolioides (Kraenzl.) Hoehne

Synonyms
- Encyclia bicornuta Brade; Encyclia linearifolioides var. fuscosepala (Hoehne) Hoehne; Encyclia microxanthina Fowlie; Epidendrum flavum var. fuscosepalum Hoehne; Epidendrum linearifolioides Kraenzl.

Species of orchid

Encyclia linearifolioides is a species of flowering plant in the family Orchidaceae, native to Bolivia, Brazil and Paraguay. It was first described in 1911 as Epidendrum linearifolioides.
