= Encyclia fehlingii =

Scientific classification
- Kingdom: Plantae
- Clade: Tracheophytes
- Clade: Angiosperms
- Clade: Monocots
- Order: Asparagales
- Family: Orchidaceae
- Subfamily: Epidendroideae
- Genus: Encyclia
- Species: E. fehlingii

Binomial name
- Encyclia fehlingii (Sauleda) Sauleda & R.M. Adams

Species of orchid

Encyclia fehlingii is a species of orchid that was named for Gladys Fehling who lived on Andros Island in the Bahamas and spent much of her time searching for the orchids of the area and growing them for her own pleasure. The plants of Encyclia fehlingii are epiphytic and grew mostly in the Fresh Creek area on Andros, but the species has also been found on New Providence Island and on Abaco.

The sepals and petals are green to yellow-green, and the lips are white with three prominent purple veins on the disc. The callus is broad and fleshy and terminates in three teeth that run out as the purple veins on the midlobe. The flattened lips have a spread of 18 mm between the tips of the lateral lobes and are 14 mm long. The sepals and petals are 17–18 mm long.

The flowers are produced in slender panicles to 70 cm high with as many as 50 flowers. There are one or two leaves measuring 0.5–2 cm wide and to 21 cm long. They are linear, oblong, rigid and may have roughened margins.
