= Encyclia trachychila =

Scientific classification
- Kingdom: Plantae
- Clade: Tracheophytes
- Clade: Angiosperms
- Clade: Monocots
- Order: Asparagales
- Family: Orchidaceae
- Subfamily: Epidendroideae
- Genus: Encyclia
- Species: E. trachychila

Binomial name
- Encyclia trachychila (Lindl.) Schltr.

Synonyms
- Epidendrum trachychilum Lindl.

Species of plant

Encyclia trachychila is a species of flowering plant in the family Orchidaceae, native to El Salvador, Guatemala, Honduras, and Nicaragua. It was first described in 1853 as Epidendrum trachychilum.
