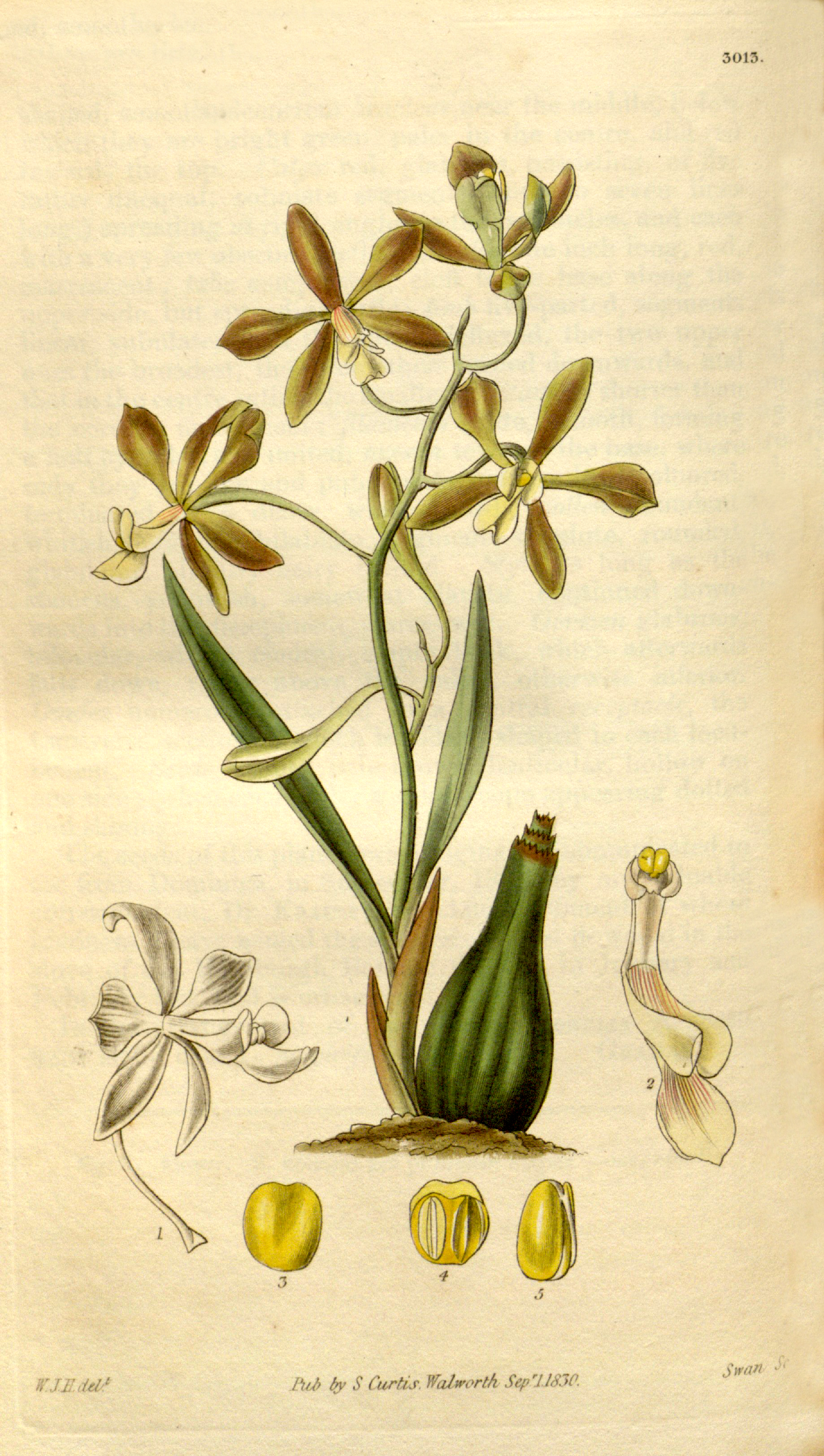

Scientific classification
- Kingdom: Plantae
- Clade: Tracheophytes
- Clade: Angiosperms
- Clade: Monocots
- Order: Asparagales
- Family: Orchidaceae
- Subfamily: Epidendroideae
- Genus: Encyclia
- Species: E. patens

Binomial name
- Encyclia patens Hook.

Synonyms
- Of var. patens: Encyclia flava (Lindl.) Porto & Brade; Encyclia odoratissima (Lindl.) Schltr.; Encyclia tripartita (Vell.) Hoehne; Epidendrum flavum Lindl.; Epidendrum glutinosum Scheidw.; Epidendrum odoratissimum Lindl.; Epidendrum oncidioides var. itabirae W.Zimm.; Epidendrum tripartitum Vell.; Sulpitia odorata Raf.; Of var. serroniana: Encyclia odoratissima var. serroniana (Barb.Rodr.) Brieger ex F.Barros; Encyclia serroniana (Barb.Rodr.) Hoehne; Epidendrum serronianum Barb.Rodr.

= Encyclia patens =

Species of orchid

Encyclia patens is a species of orchid native to east and south Brazil. Encyclia flava is a synonym of Encyclia patens var. patens.

As of December 2023, two varieties were accepted by Plants of the World Online:

- Encyclia patens var. patens
- Encyclia patens var. serroniana (Barb.Rodr.) Romanini & F.Barros

The diploid chromosome number of E. patens has been determined as 2n = 40.
