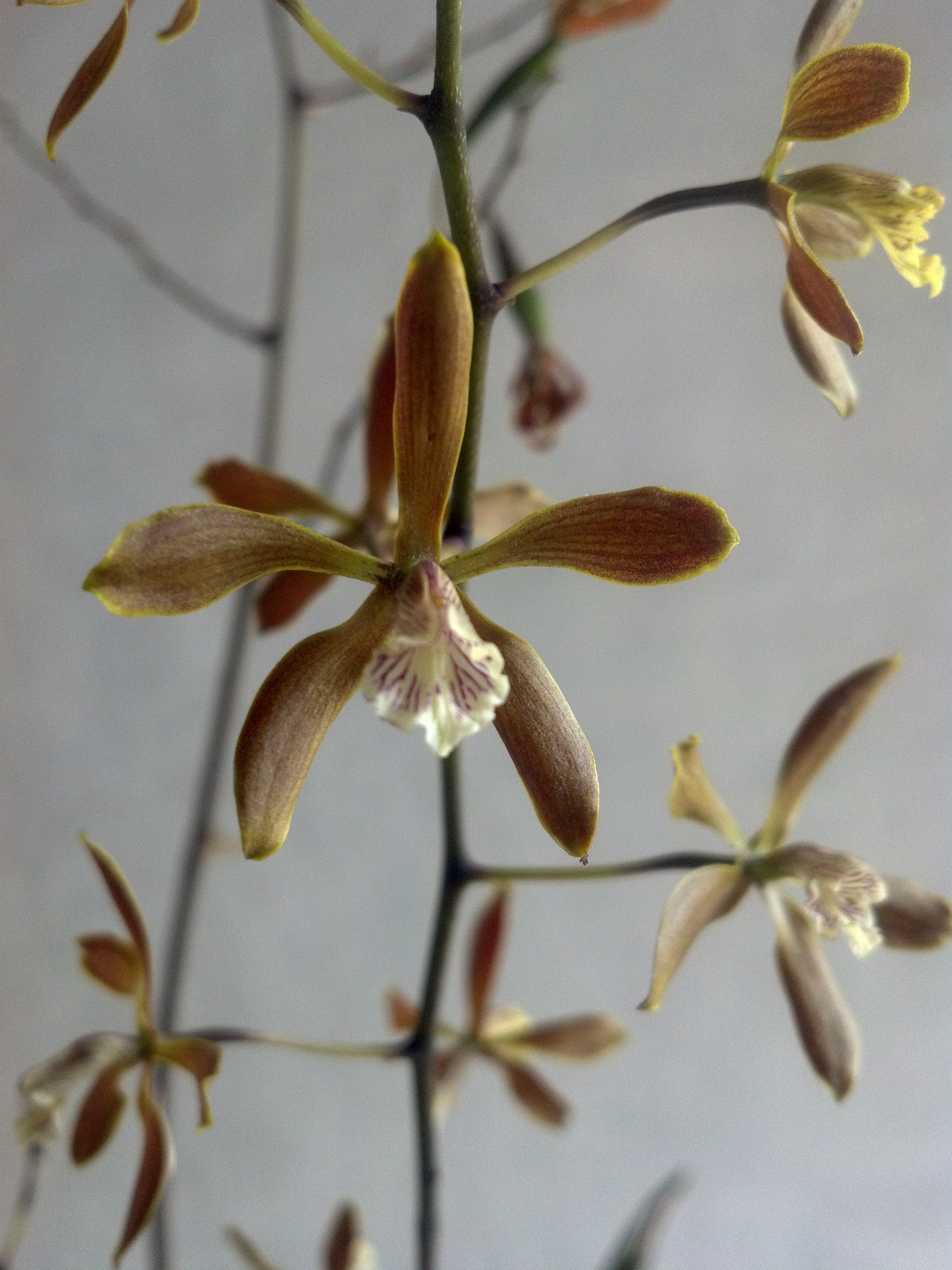

Scientific classification
- Kingdom: Plantae
- Clade: Tracheophytes
- Clade: Angiosperms
- Clade: Monocots
- Order: Asparagales
- Family: Orchidaceae
- Subfamily: Epidendroideae
- Genus: Encyclia
- Species: E. candollei

Binomial name
- Encyclia candollei (Lindl.) Schltr. (1914)

Synonyms
- Encyclia laxa Schltr. (1918); Epidendrum candollei Lindl. (Basionym) (1839); Epidendrum cepiforme Hook. (1839); Epidendrum laxum Schltr. (1918)

= Encyclia candollei =

Species of orchid

Encyclia candollei is a species of epiphytic orchid of yellow-brown to reddish flowers, native to Belize, Guatemala and Mexico.

== Description ==
The orchid species is a medium-sized, cool growing, epiphytic species. It has clustered, ovoid-conical to globose pseudobulbs enveloped basally by several scarious, sheaths and 1 to 3, coriaceous, elliptic -ligulate leaves. It blooms in the later spring and summer on a terminal 3 foot [to 90 cm] long, many flowered panicle arising on a mature pseudobulb with several short branches and carrying 2 to 8, weakly fragrant flowers.

The flowers have sepals and petals that are yellow-brown to chocolate and a lip that is cream-colored with fine red-violet veins. The flowers are displayed high above the leaves and have a mild fragrance.

== Distribution and habitat ==
Encyclia candollei is a cool growing epiphyte usually growing on oaks in mountainous forests at elevations of 500 to 1500 meters. Their habitat is situated in Belize, Guatemala and Mexico.

== Gallery ==
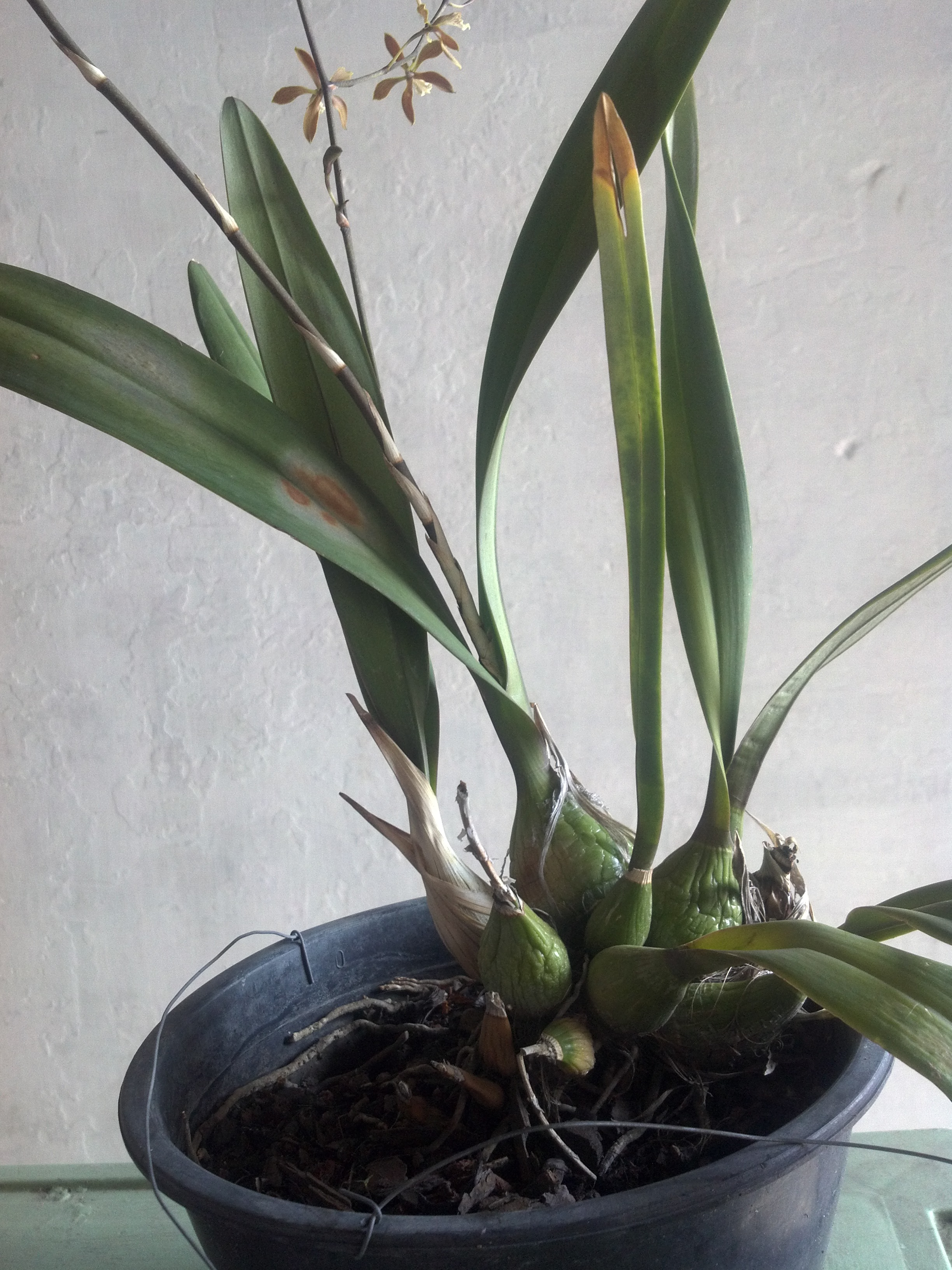
Encyclia candollei plant

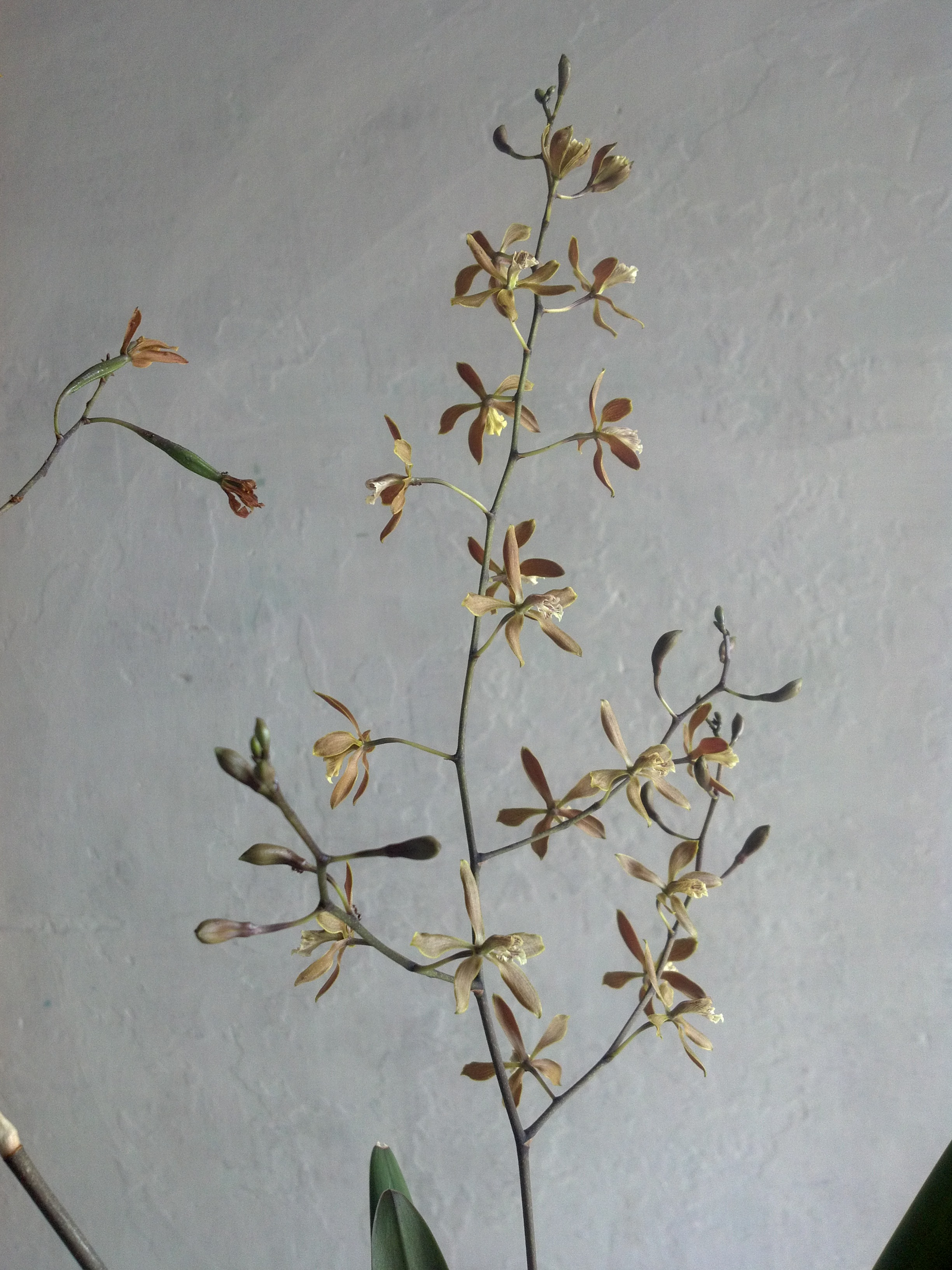
Encyclia candollei inflorescence

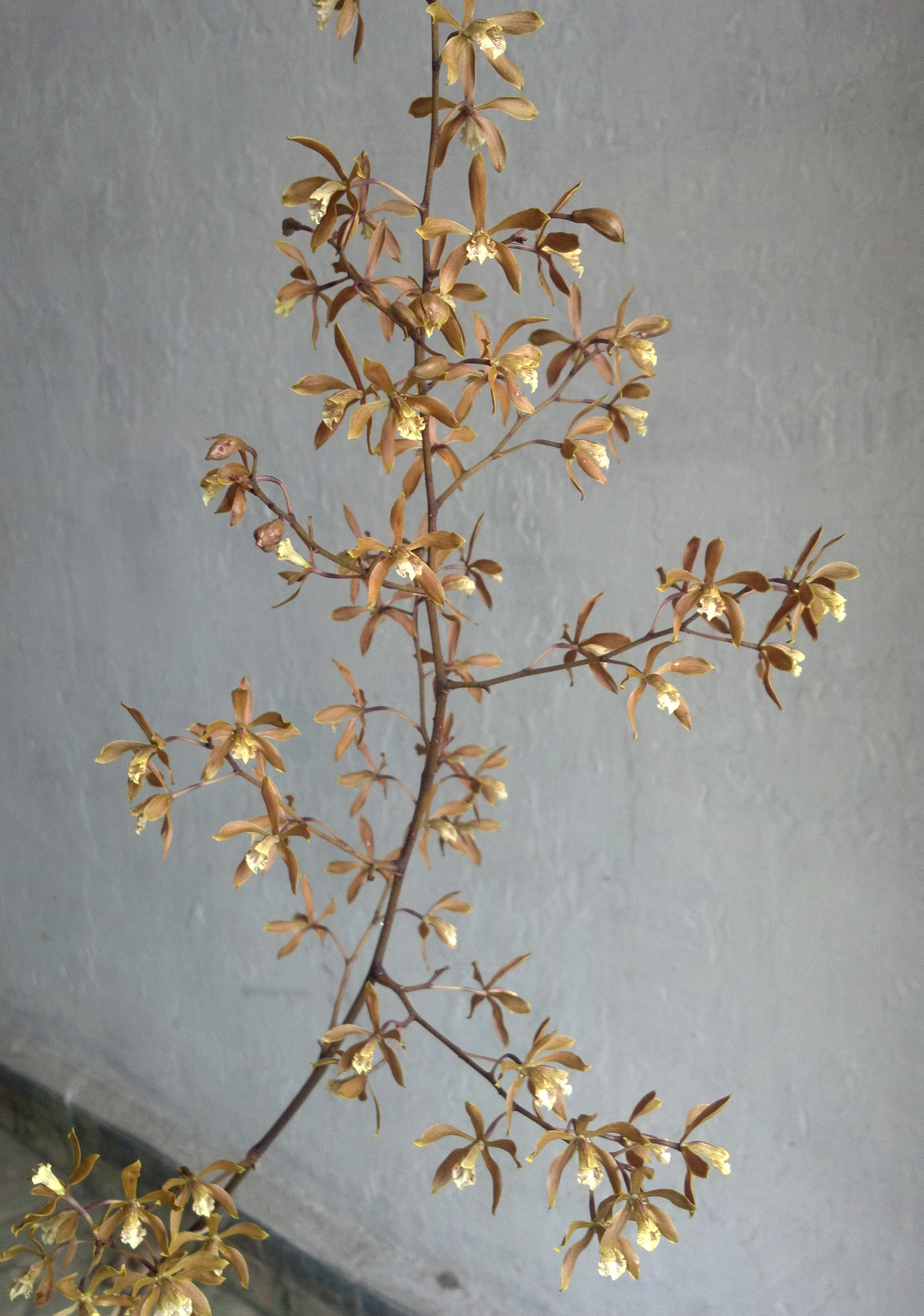
Encyclia candollei inflorescence

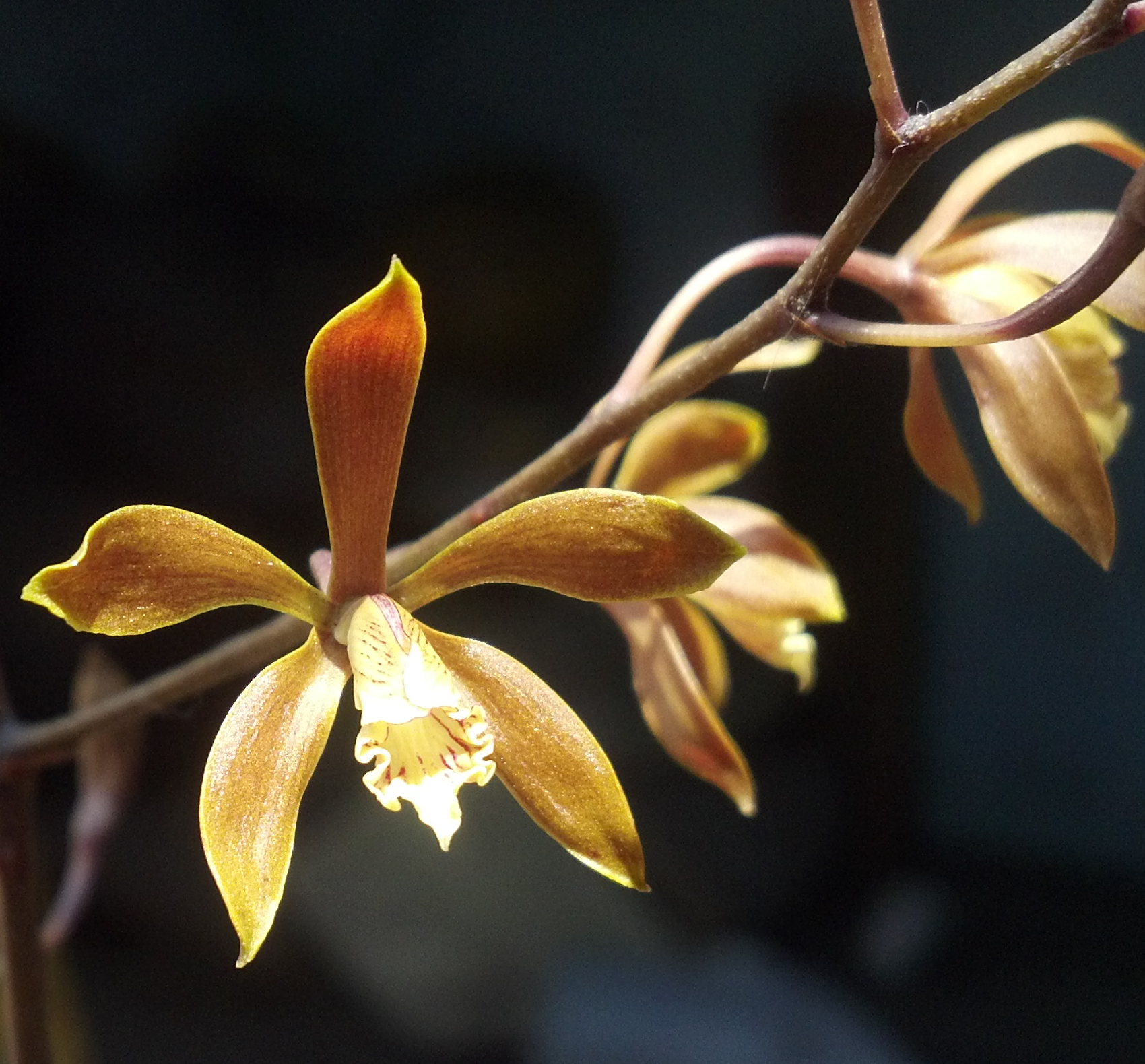
Encyclia candollei detail of flowers
