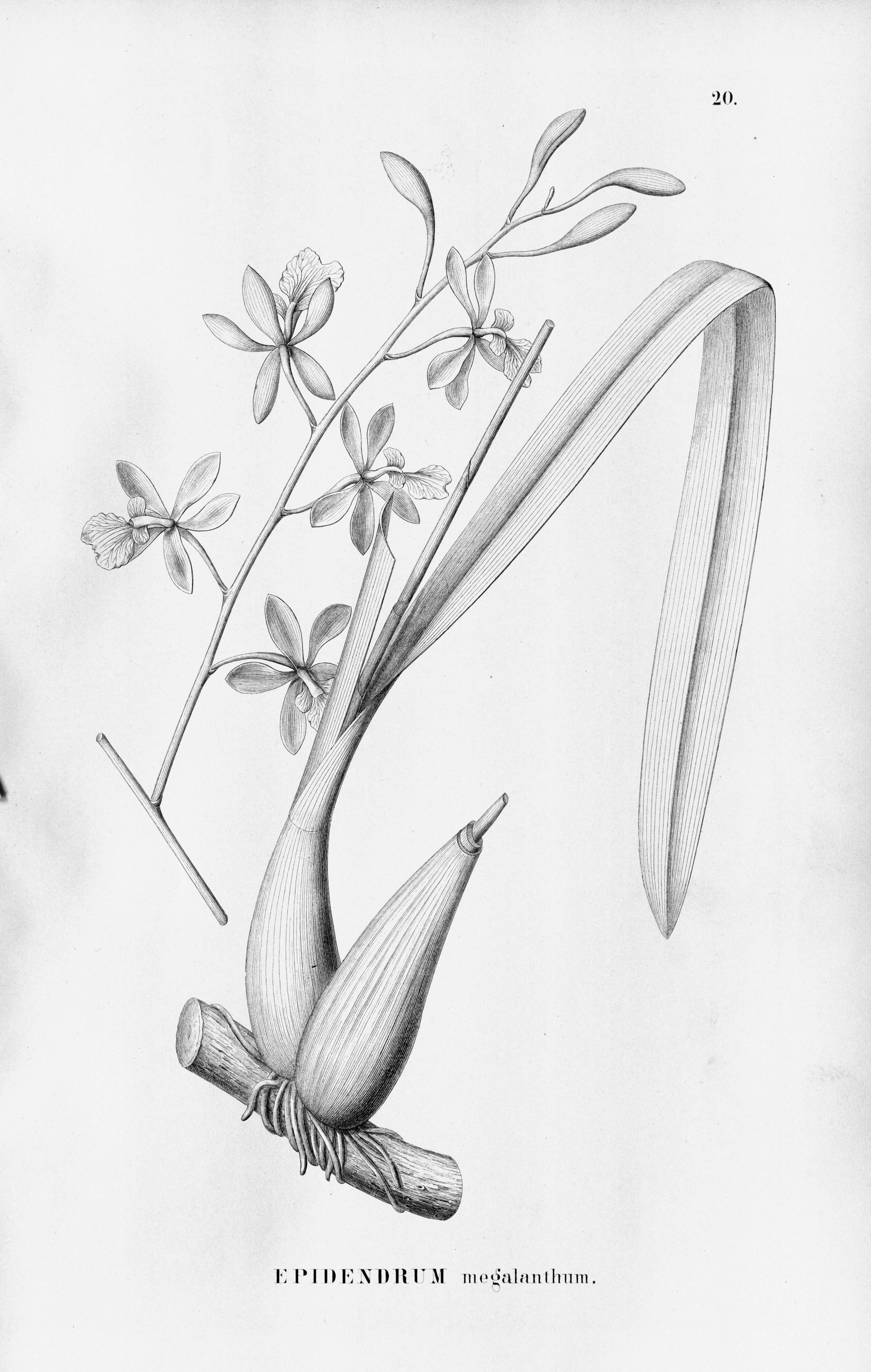

Scientific classification
- Kingdom: Plantae
- Clade: Tracheophytes
- Clade: Angiosperms
- Clade: Monocots
- Order: Asparagales
- Family: Orchidaceae
- Subfamily: Epidendroideae
- Genus: Encyclia
- Species: E. advena

Binomial name
- Encyclia advena (Rchb.f.) Porto & Brade

Synonyms
- Encyclia capartiana (L.Linden) Fowlie & Duveen; Encyclia hollandae Fowlie; Encyclia megalantha (Barb.Rodr.) Porto & Brade; Epidendrum advenum Rchb.f.; Epidendrum capartianum L.Linden; Epidendrum godseffianum Rolfe; Epidendrum megalanthum Barb.Rodr.

= Encyclia advena =

Species of orchid

Encyclia advena is a species of epiphytic orchid, native to Atlantic forests in Brazil.

== Description ==
Encyclia advena is a medium-sized, hot to warm growing, epiphytic species, with conic-elongate pseudobulbs carrying 1 to 2, apical, coriaceous, narrowly lanceolate leaves and flowers in the Brazilian spring (December to March). Because of its first flowering time, in December, the orchid is also named as "the Advent encyclia".

Encyclia advena has olive or yellow petals and sepals with brown or maroon veins. Sometimes there are flushes of maroon on the petals. The lip is white and has some purple veins. The flower form is cupped and the petals are fleshy. The inflorescence is branched and up to four times taller than the foliage.

== Distribution and habitat ==
Encyclia advena grows in the eastern Atlantic rainforests of Brazil at elevations of 200 to 800 meters as a medium sized, hot to warm growing epiphyte with conic-elongate pseudobulbs.
