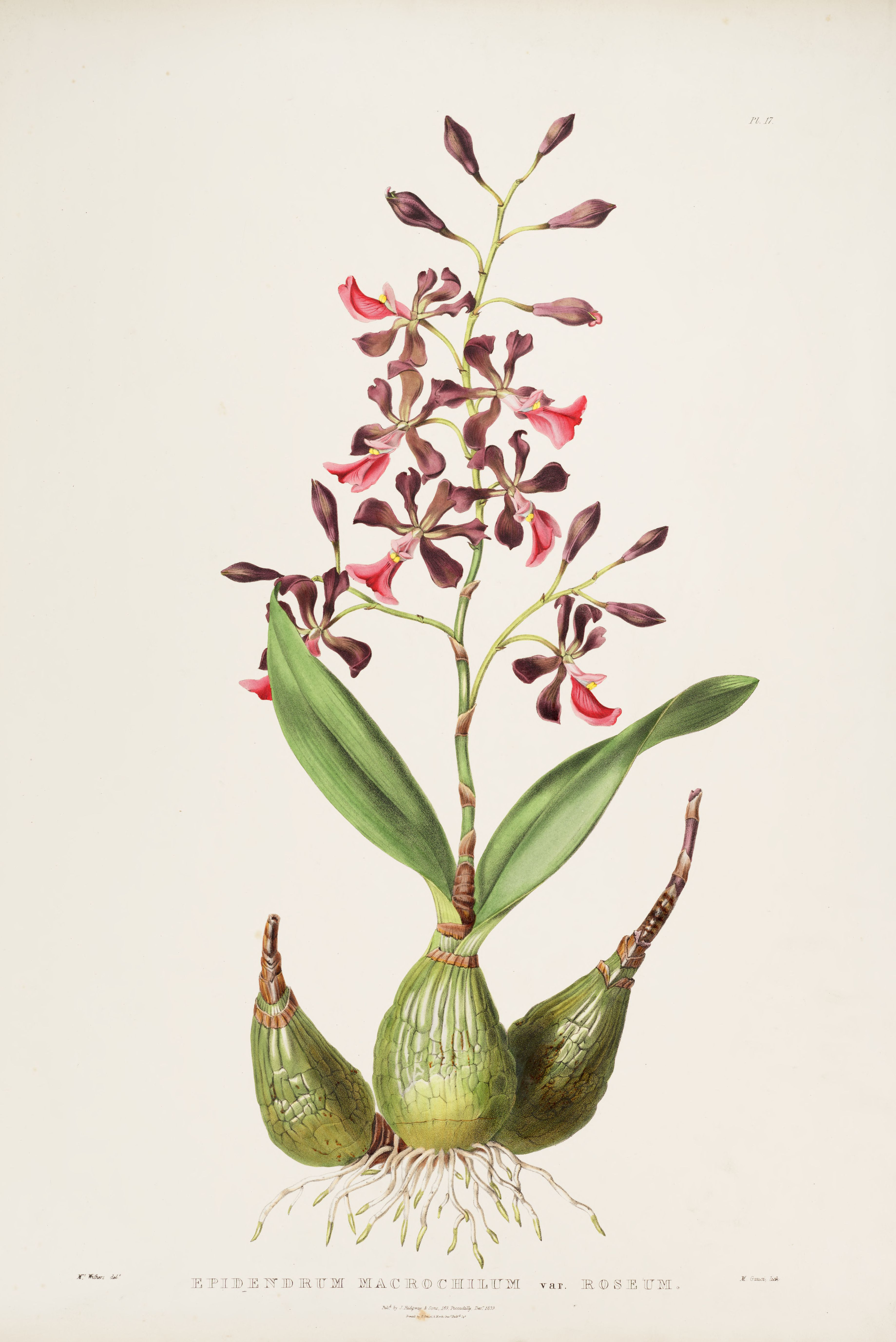

Scientific classification
- Kingdom: Plantae
- Clade: Tracheophytes
- Clade: Angiosperms
- Clade: Monocots
- Order: Asparagales
- Family: Orchidaceae
- Subfamily: Epidendroideae
- Genus: Encyclia
- Species: E. cordigera

Binomial name
- Encyclia cordigera (Kunth) Dressler

Synonyms
- See text

= Encyclia cordigera =

Species of orchid

Encyclia cordigera is a species of orchid.

== Synonyms ==
- Cymbidium cordigerum Kunth (Basionym)
- Epidendrum macrochilum Hook.
- Epidendrum macrochilum var. roseum Bateman
- Encyclia macrochila (Hook.) Neumann
- Epidendrum macrochilum var. albopurpurea C.Morren
- Epidendrum longipetalum God.-Leb.
- Encyclia atropurpurea var. leucantha Schltr.
- Encyclia atropurpurea var. rhodoglossa Schltr.
- Encyclia doeringii Hoehne
- Encyclia atropurpurea var. rosea (Bateman) Summerh.
- Epidendrum doeringii (Hoehne) A.D.Hawkes
- Encyclia cordigera var. rosea (Bateman) H.G.Jones
- Epidendrum cordigerum (Kunth) Foldats
- Encyclia cordigera f. leucantha (Schltr.) Withner

== Gallery ==
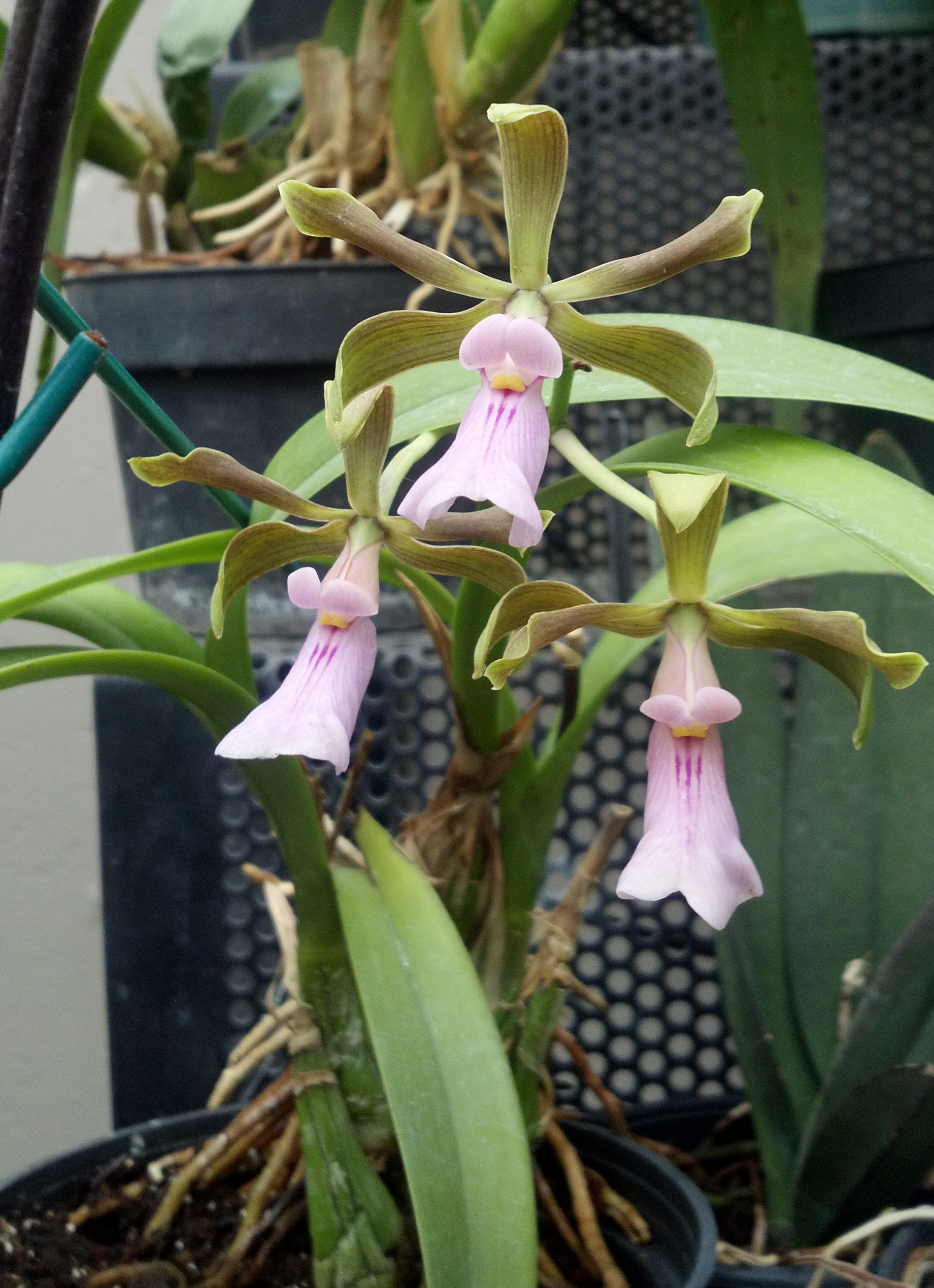
Encyclia cordigera in Parque Bicentenario, Ciudad de México, Mexico.

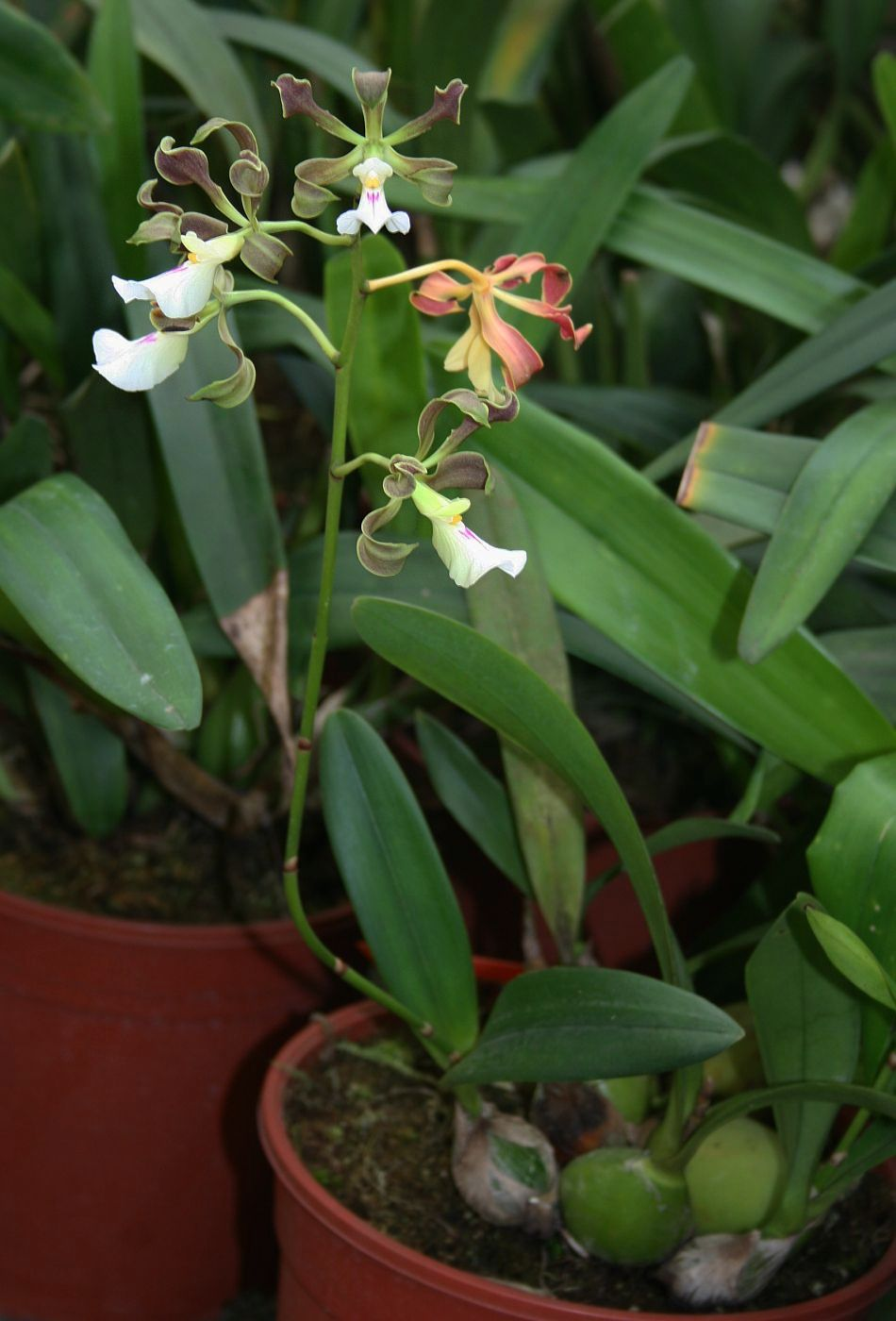
Encyclia cordigera habitus

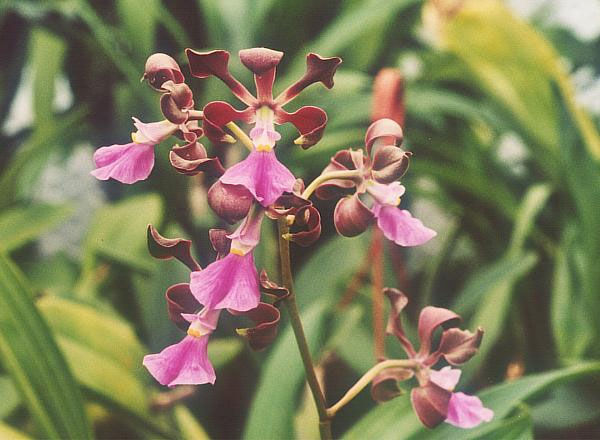
Encyclia cordigera inflorescence

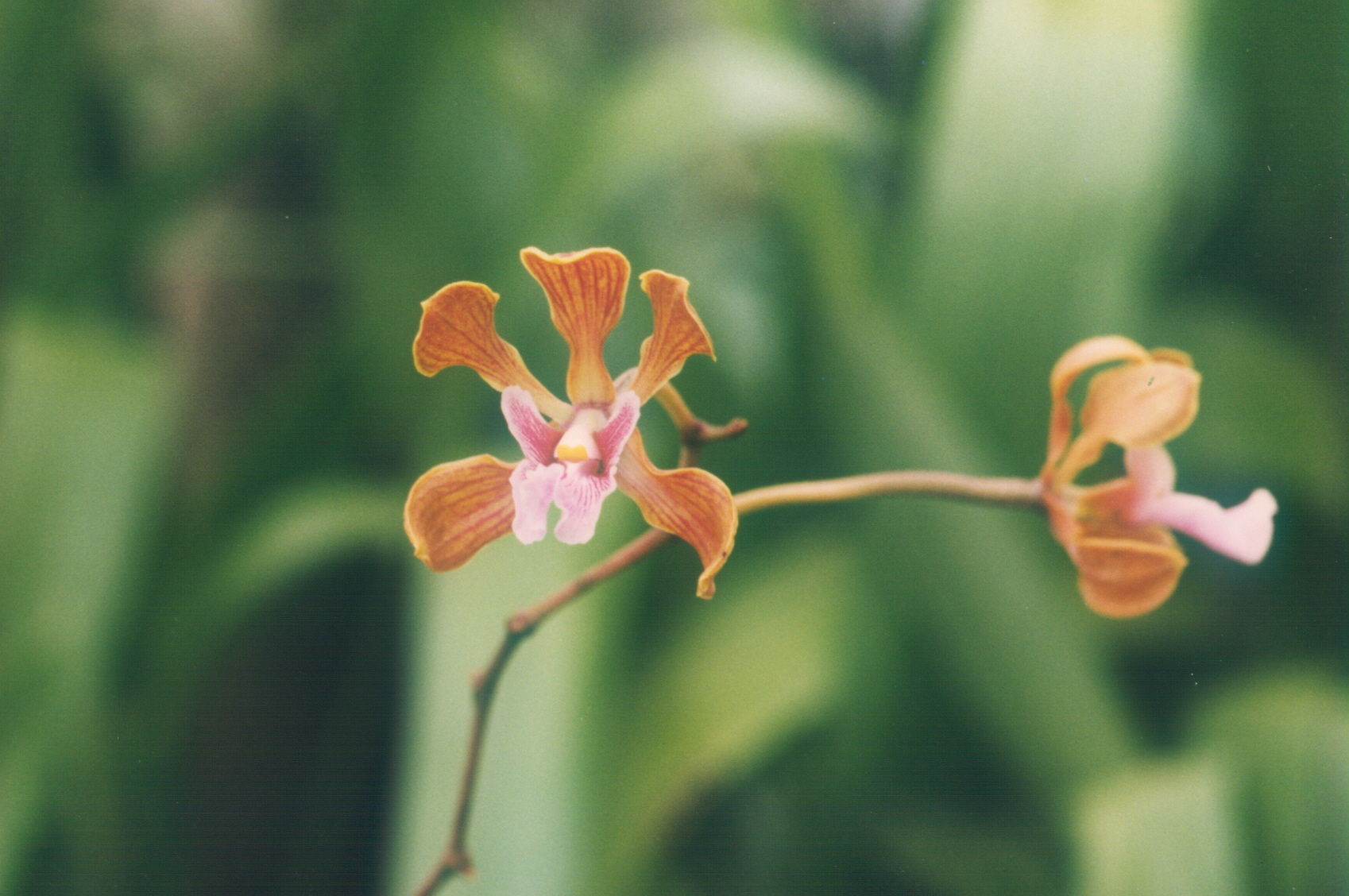
Encyclia cordigera flower

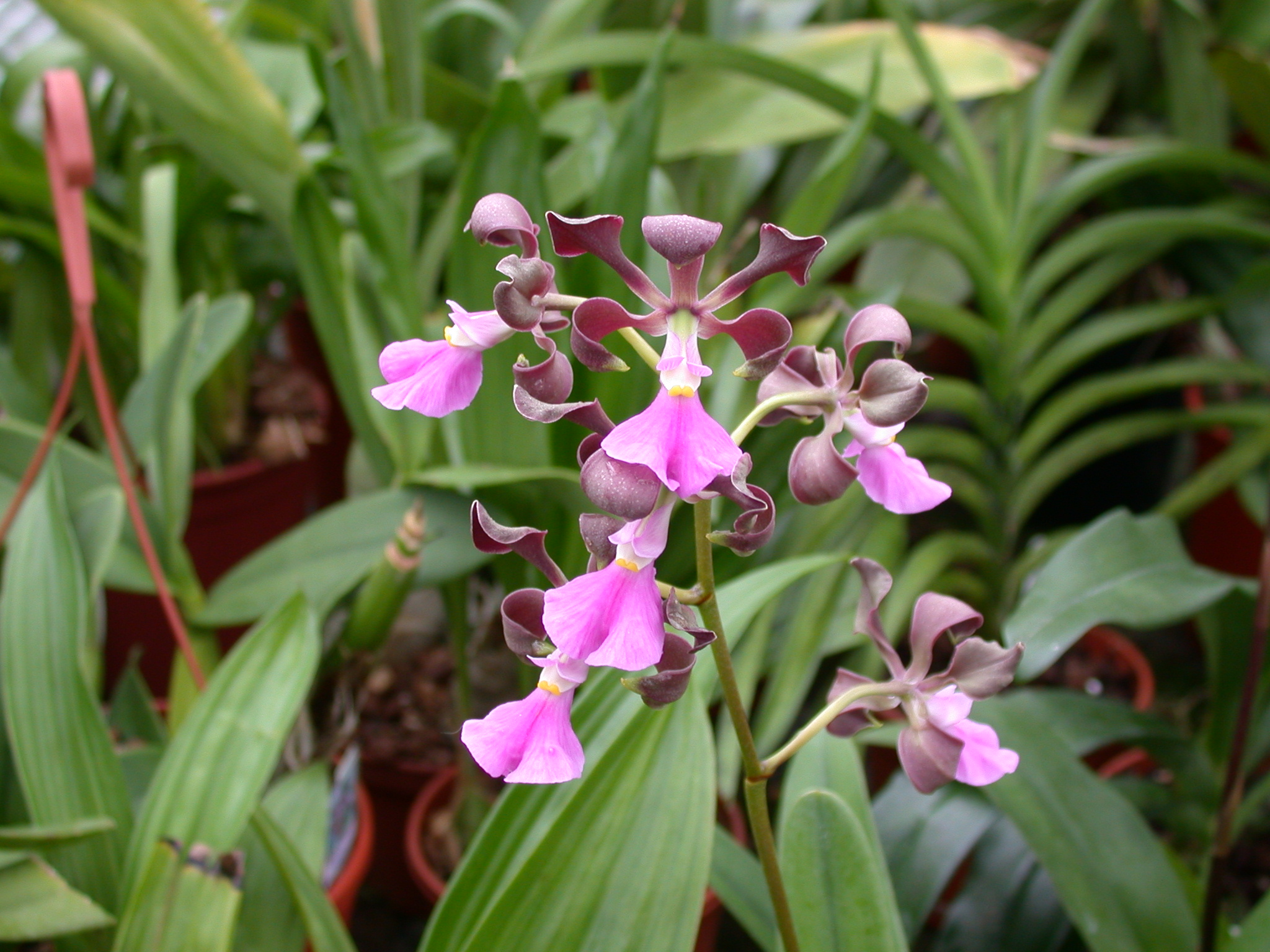
Encyclia cordigera flower

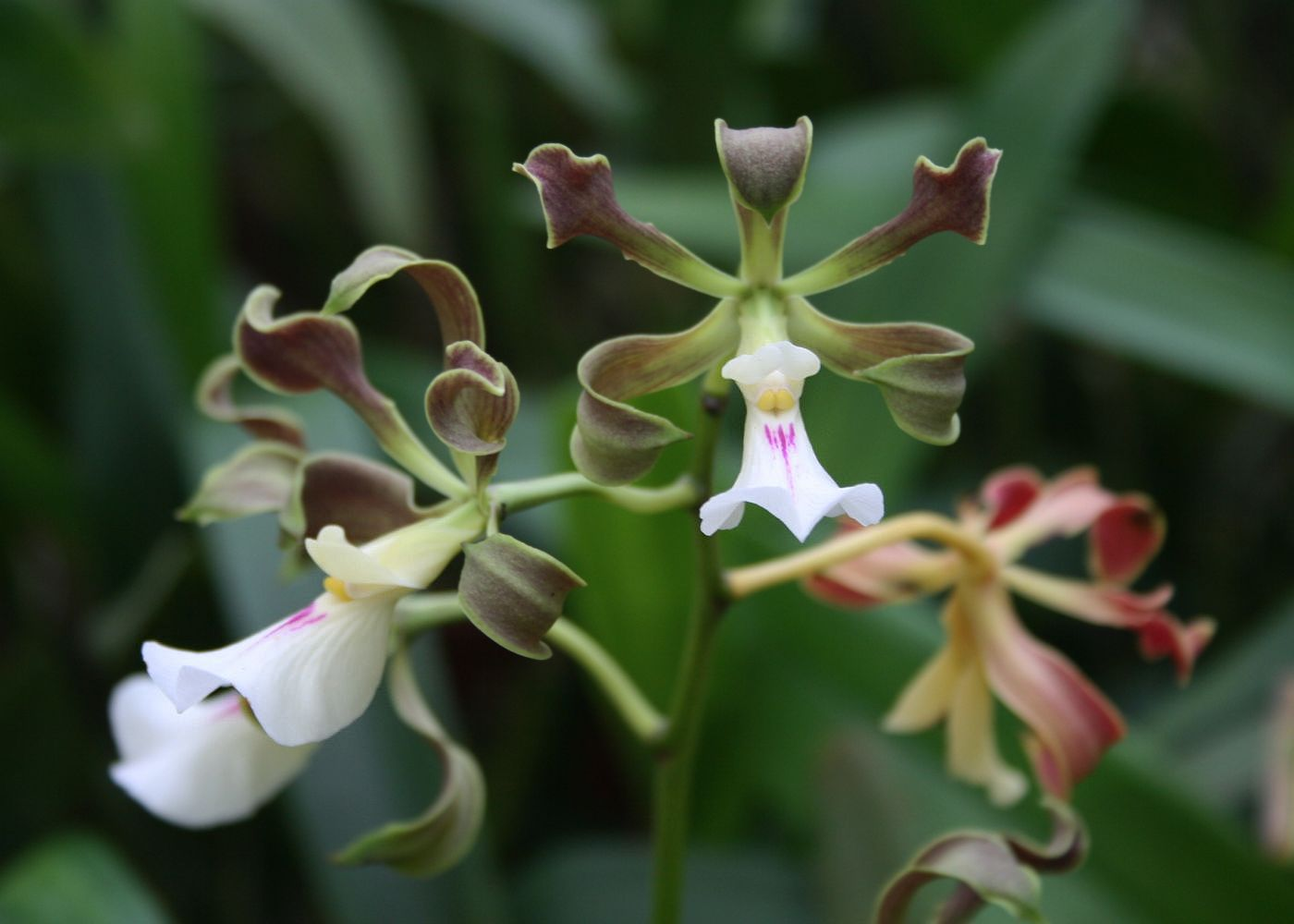
Encyclia cordigera flower

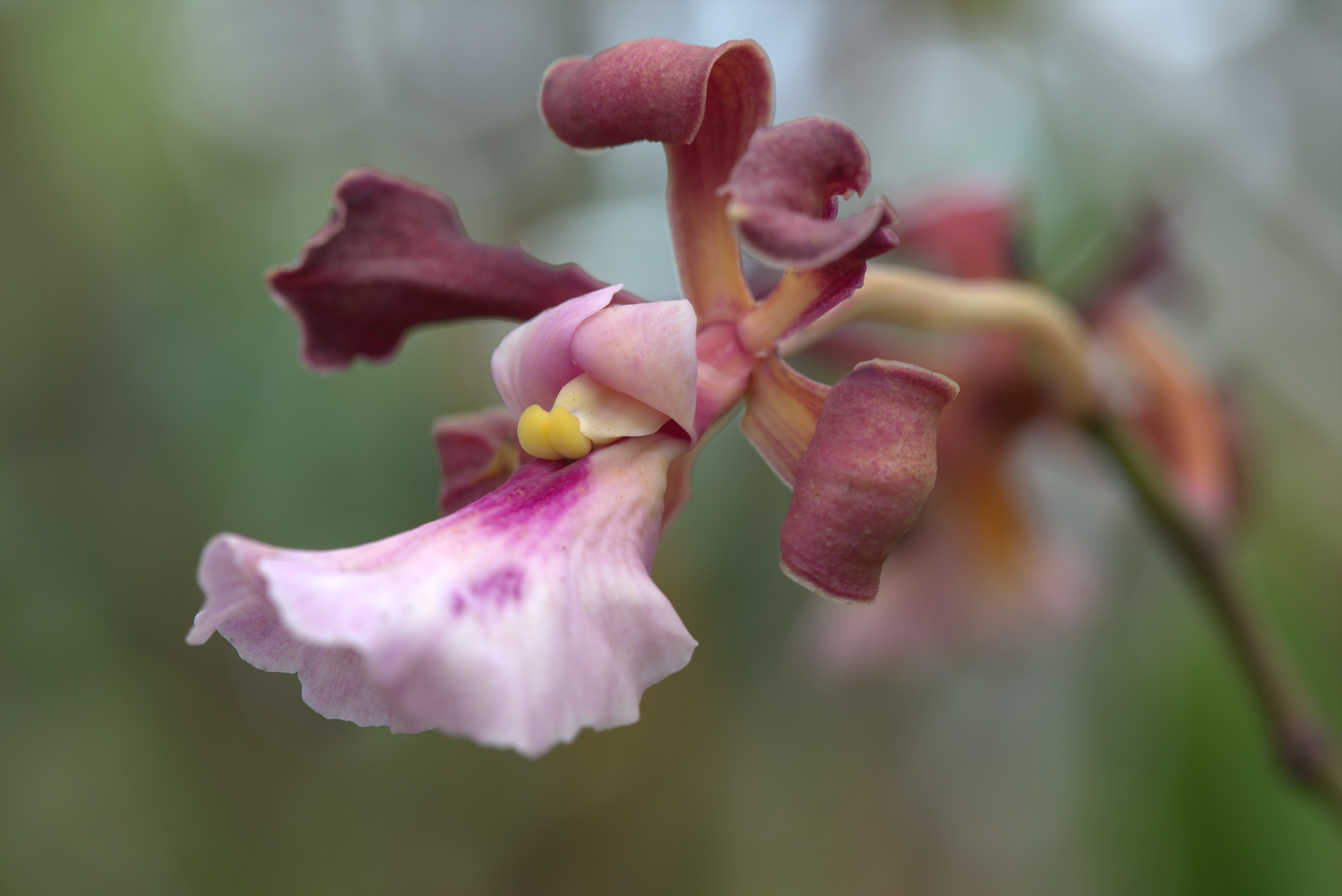
Encyclia cordigera flower

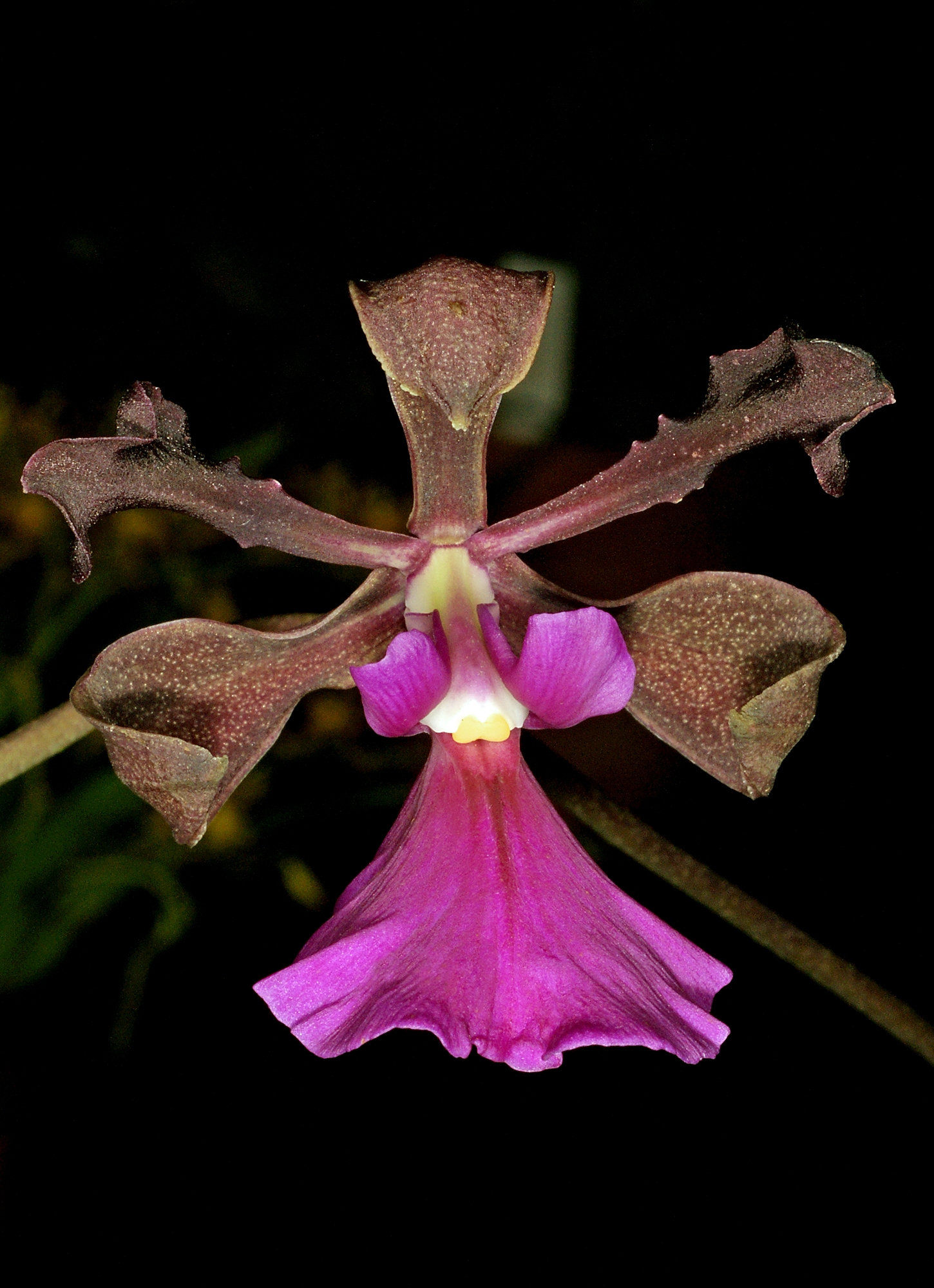
Encyclia cordigera flower

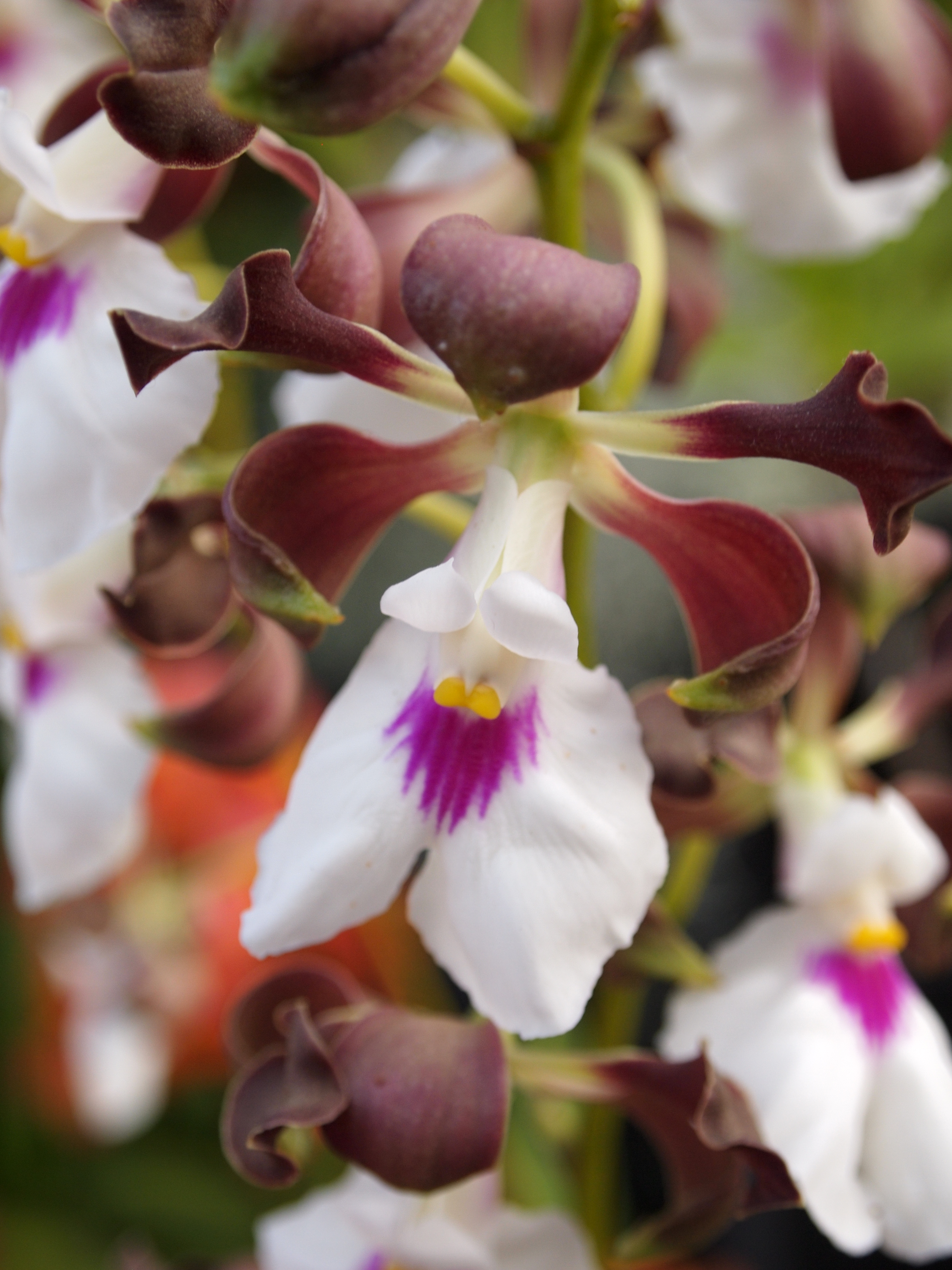
Encyclia cordigera semialba

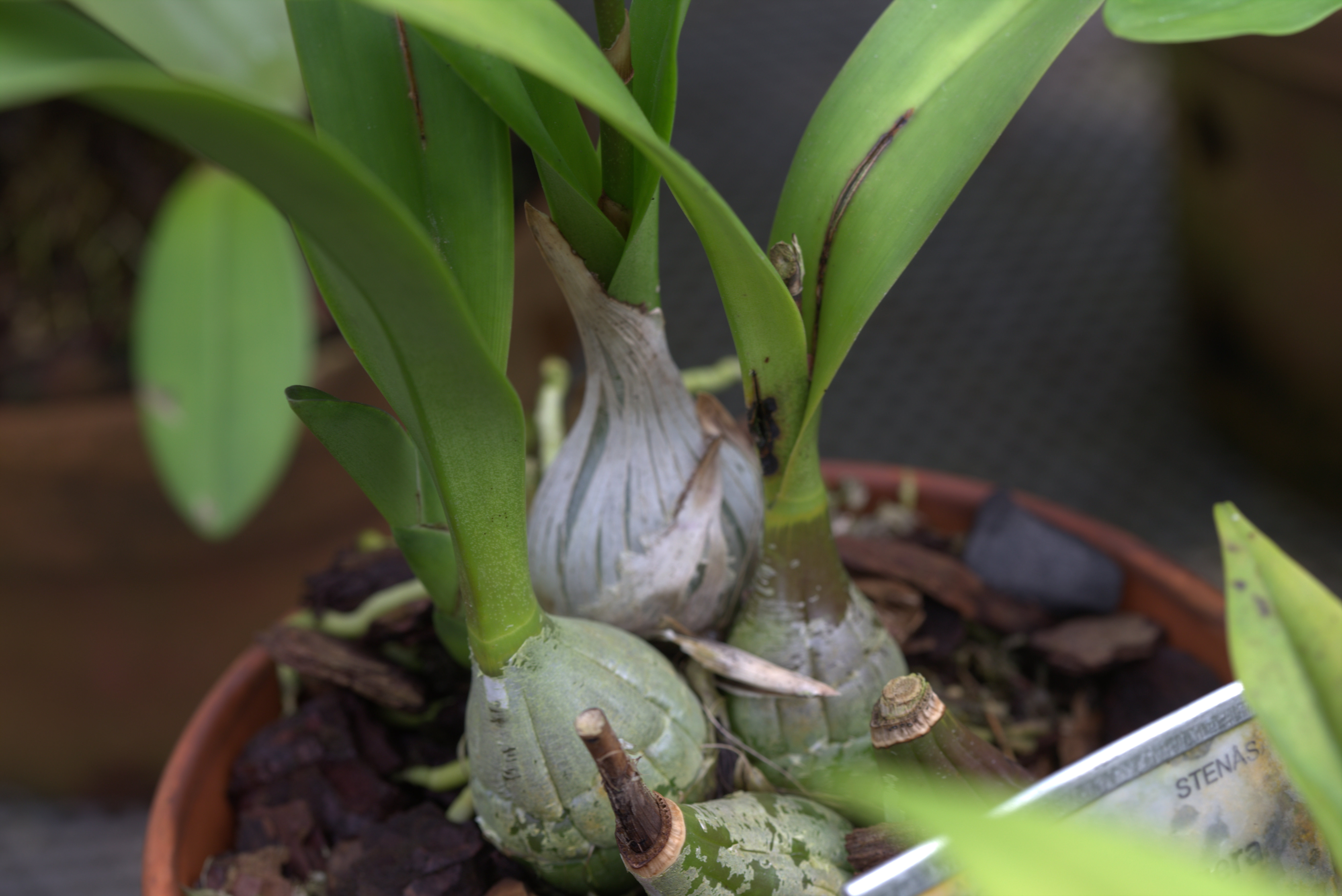
Encyclia cordigera pseudobulbs
