= Encyclia conchaechila =

Scientific classification
- Kingdom: Plantae
- Clade: Tracheophytes
- Clade: Angiosperms
- Clade: Monocots
- Order: Asparagales
- Family: Orchidaceae
- Subfamily: Epidendroideae
- Genus: Encyclia
- Species: E. conchaechila

Binomial name
- Encyclia conchaechila (Barb.Rodr.) Porto & Brade

Synonyms
- Epidendrum conchaechilum Barb.Rodr.

Species of plant

Encyclia conchaechila is a species of flowering plant in the family Orchidaceae, native to north and northeast Brazil, Colombia, Guyana and Venezuela . It was first described in 1877 as Epidendrum conchaechilum.
