= Encyclia xipheres =

- Encyclia xipheres flower from above, showing pale "warts" on the ovary and pedicel

Scientific classification
- Kingdom: Plantae
- Clade: Tracheophytes
- Clade: Angiosperms
- Clade: Monocots
- Order: Asparagales
- Family: Orchidaceae
- Subfamily: Epidendroideae
- Genus: Encyclia
- Species: E. xipheres

Binomial name
- Encyclia xipheres (Rchb.f.) Schltr.

Synonyms
- Epidendrum xipheres Rchb.f.; Encyclia purpusii Schltr.; Epidendrum yucatanense Schltr.

Species of orchid

A single plant with numerous leaf-bearing pseudobulbs and flowers

Encyclia xipheres, the threadstemmed encyclia, or is a species of orchid with an epiphytic habit. Occurring from southern Mexico south into Honduras, it is a member of the family Orchidaceae.

== Description ==
Encyclia xipheres is one of about 40 Mexican Encyclia species, and distinguishing this species from some of the others can be tricky. Here are key features of this species:

- As with all Encyclia species, Encyclia xipheres is an herbaceous plant growing epiphytically. Its rhizomes grow horizontally, along its length producing pseudobulbs, atop each of which usually only one stiff, leathery leaf arises. When clumps of the species are seen, the clump derives from a single plant.
- Pseudobulbs are narrowly egg-shaped, up to 2.5 cm (1 in) tall. Leaves atop the pseudobulbs are very narrow and up to 20 cm (8 in) long.
- Branched inflorescences up to 15 cm (6 in) long usually bear 4-6 loosely gathered flowers, which are about 2.5 cm (1 in) across. Both sepals and petals are very narrow with sharp tips, to 1.3 cm (1/2 in) long, and brownish. The lip, or labellum, is whitish, with narrow side lobes and narrowing to a stalk-like base. The lip's mid-lobe is broadly egg-shaped and features several thickened veins.
- Capsular-fruits are ellipsoid with 3 ribs, and covered with very small, pale, warty protuberances.

Encyclia xipheres may be identical to Encyclia nematocaulon of Cuba, except that it has been said to bear no warty protuberances on its fruits. See this page's taxonomy section.

== Distribution ==
In southern Mexico, Encyclia xipheres occurs in the states of Campeche, Quintana Roo, Tabasco, Veracruz and Yucatán. In Central America it is found in Guatemala and Honduras.

== Habitat ==
In Mexico's Yucatan Peninsula, Encyclia xipheres grows in seasonal tropical forest with long dry seasons.

== As an ornamental plant ==
Encyclia xipheres is best grown on slabs or boards cut from fibrous trunks of tree ferns or of cork.

== Taxonomy ==
In 1853 when Heinrich Gustav Reichenbach formally described and named Encyclia xipheres under the basionym Epidendrum xipheres, he noted that his familiarity with the orchid was based on a collection imported from Peru (E. xipheres not native to Peru) by Messrs. Booth and son of Hamburg; material, or "exemplaires," from that collection had been provided by the Booths. The Scottish Messrs. Booth and Son were world-famous orchid and exotic plant pioneers and botanical collaborators based in Hamburg, Germany. The concern in which they worked now is known as the Baumschule Lorenz von Ehren.

=== The connection with Encyclia nematocaulon ===
In 1850, Epidendrum nematocaulon was described and named by Achille Richard, based on live material from Cuba. Later the taxon was transferred to the genus Encyclia. For much of the last century, the taxon Encyclia xipheres was regarded as synonymous with Encyclia nematocaulon, which was described as present in southern Mexico, Cuba and northern Central America.

In 2014, J.D. Ackerman in the Orchid Flora of the Greater Antilles stated that the Cuban plants lacked the warty pedicels, ovaries and capsules seen in the continental plants, and that the warty continental populations should be considered Encyclia xipheres. Since 2014, plants have been documented in Cuba with warty features and otherwise identical to the mainland plants. In 2020, in what appears to be the most recent peer-reviewed publication on the matter, it was suggested that the name Encyclia xipheres be regarded as a synonym of Encyclia nematocaulon.

In 2026, it was unclear why both Plants of the World Online and Catalogue of Life treated E. nematocaulon strictly as a Cuban species, while Encyclia xipheres was designated as Mexican and Central American.

== Etymology ==
The genus name Encyclia is based on the Greek enkyklos, meaning "to encircle," referring to the side lobes of the flower's lip, or labellum, which encircle the flower's column.

The species name xipheres apparently is based on the Greek xiphos, meaning "a sword," which may apply to the flowers' narrow, sword-like sepals.
