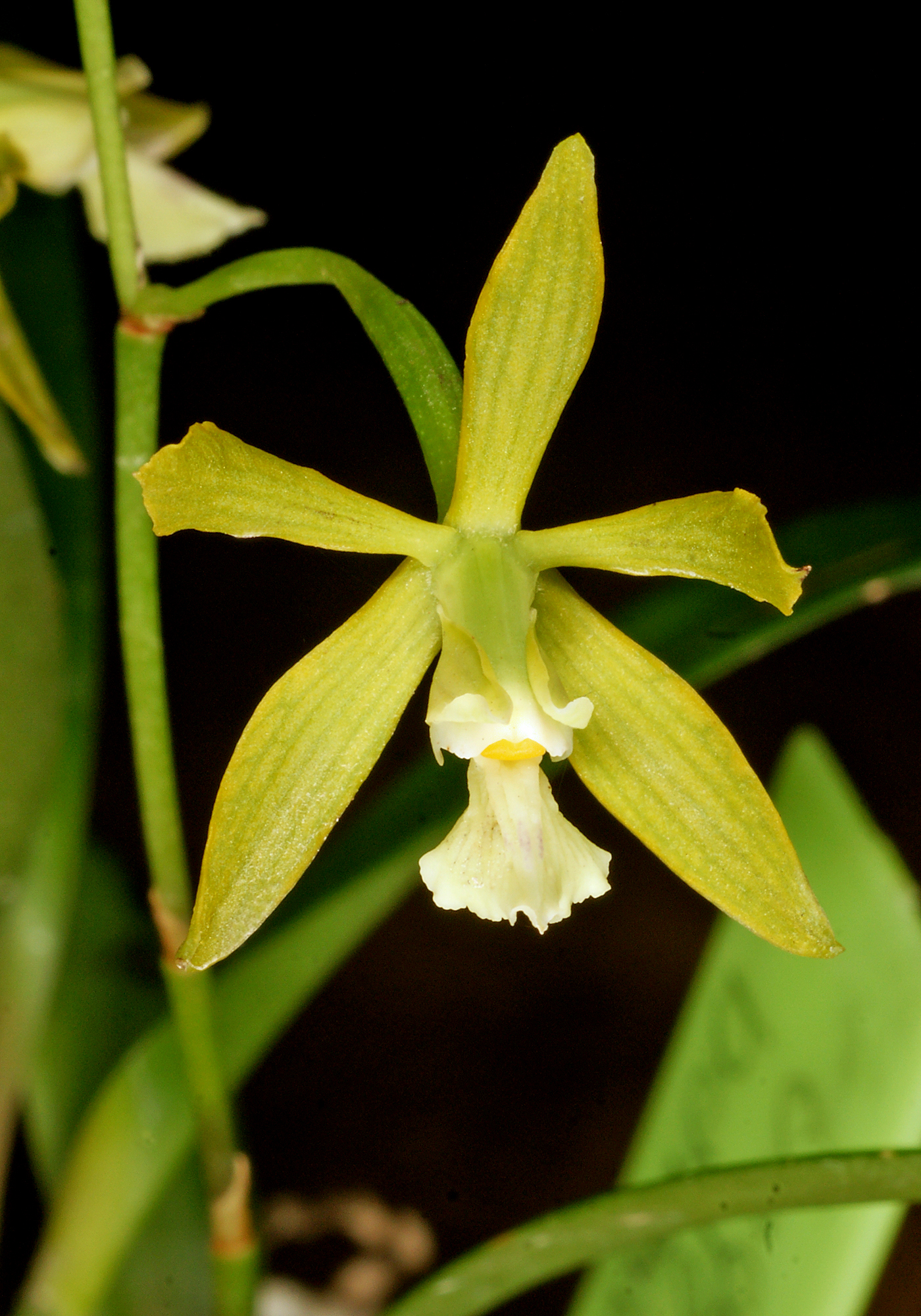

Scientific classification
- Kingdom: Plantae
- Clade: Tracheophytes
- Clade: Angiosperms
- Clade: Monocots
- Order: Asparagales
- Family: Orchidaceae
- Subfamily: Epidendroideae
- Genus: Encyclia
- Species: E. bohnkiana

Binomial name
- Encyclia bohnkiana V.P.Castro & Campacci (1999)

= Encyclia bohnkiana =

Species of orchid

Encyclia bohnkiana is a species of orchid endemic in the Atlantic rain forest to the northeast of Brazil.

== Gallery ==
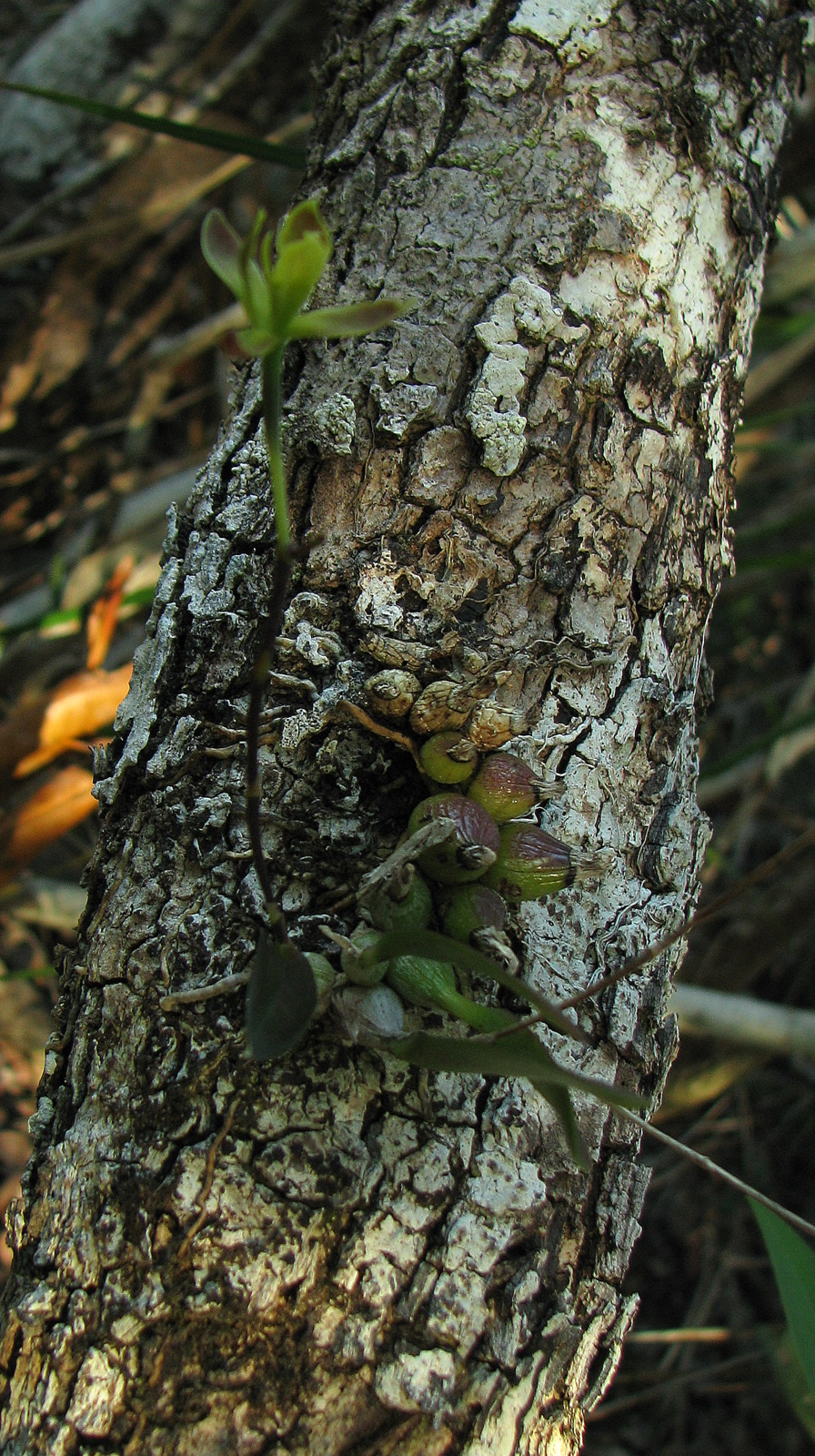
Encyclia bohnkiana habitus plant

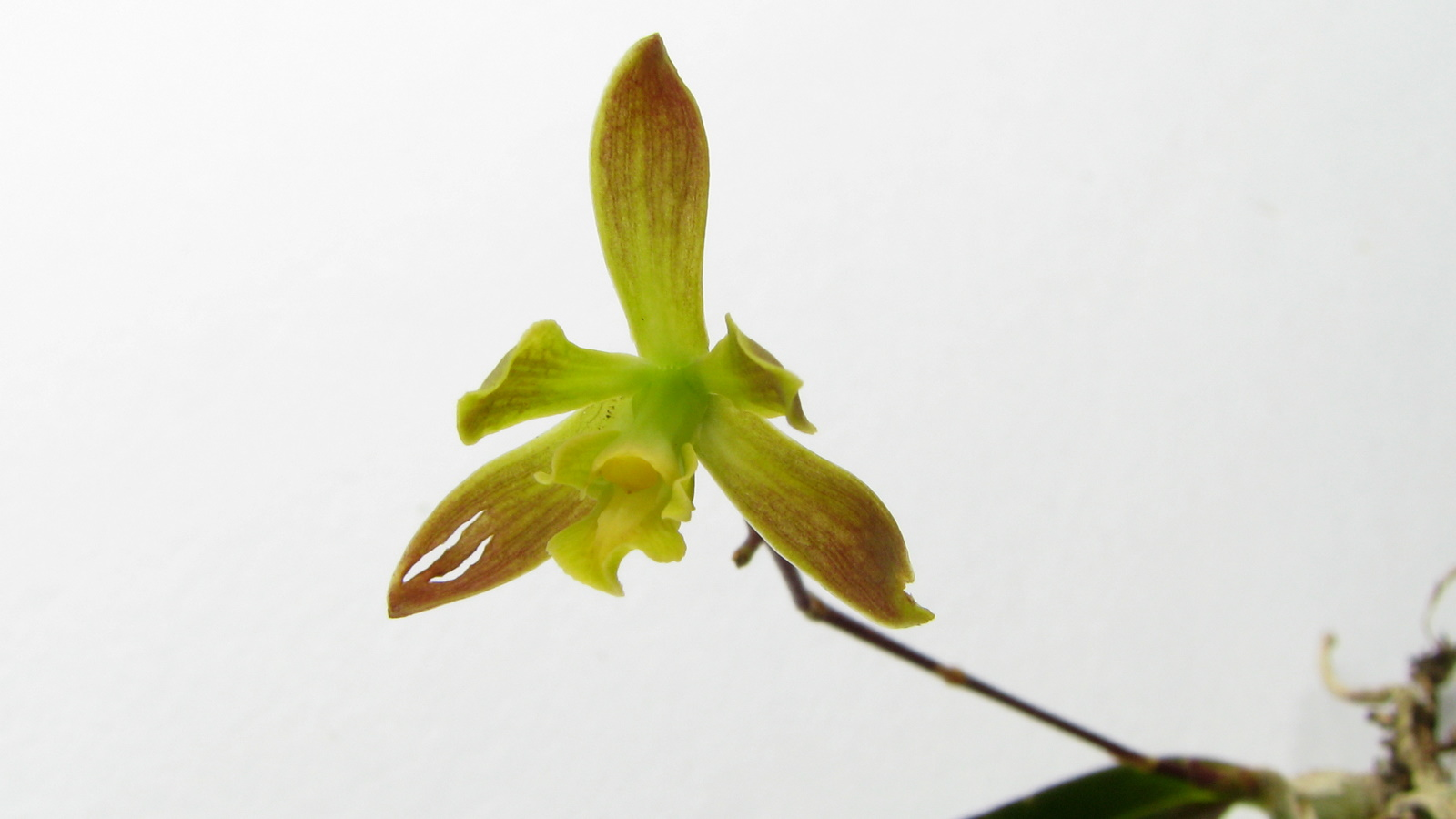
Encyclia bohnkiana flower

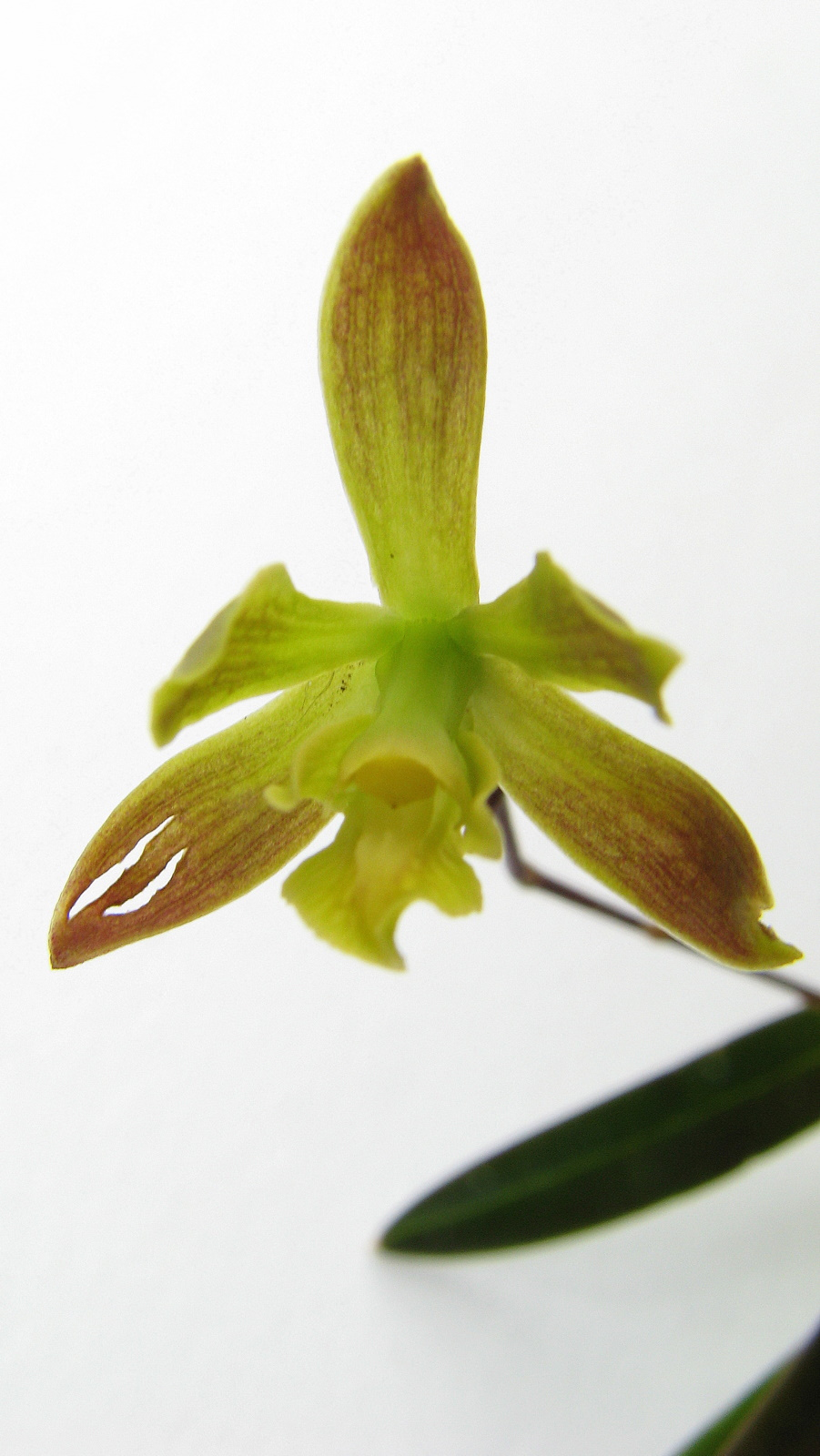
Encyclia bohnkiana flower

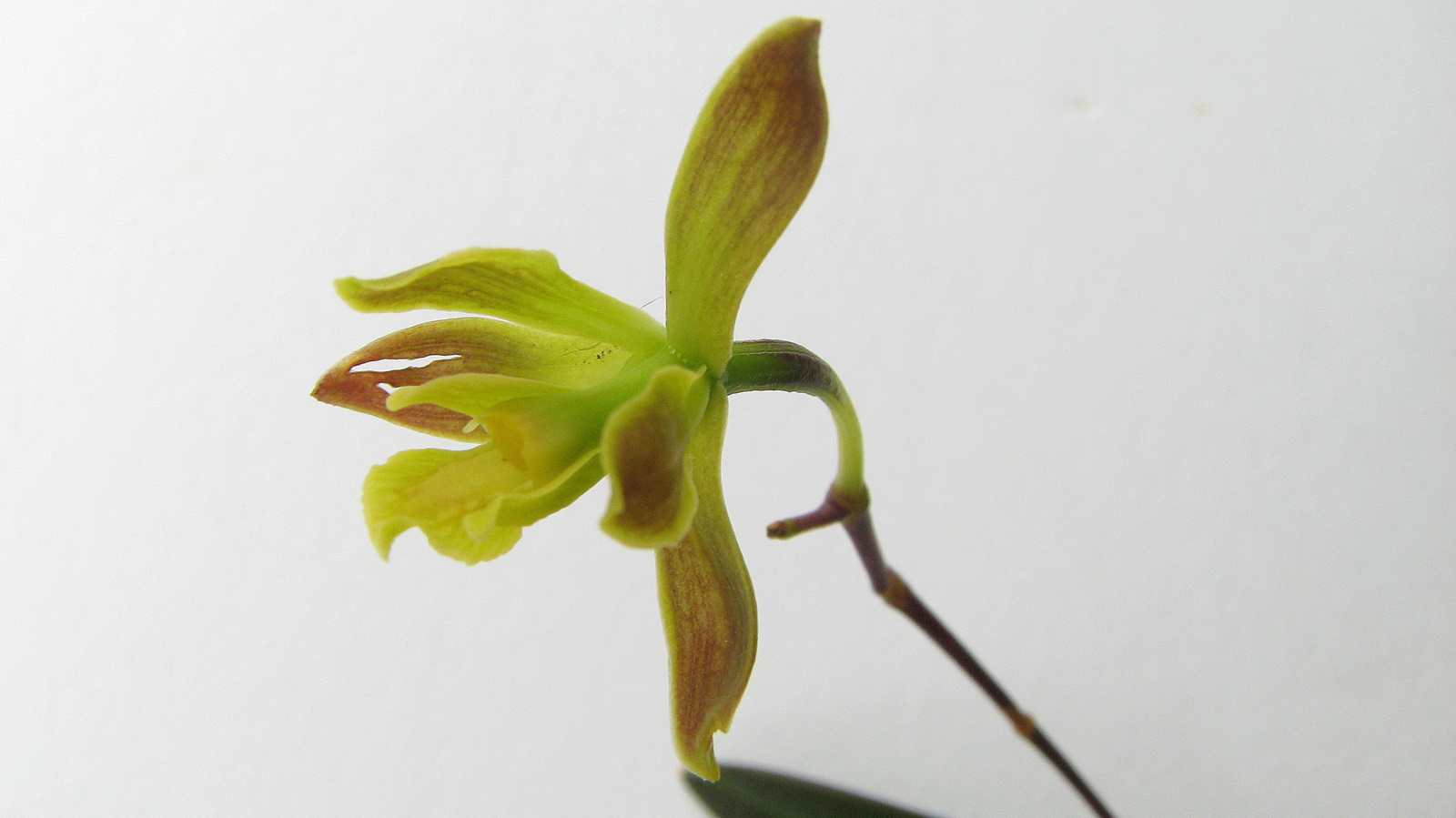
Encyclia bohnkiana flower
