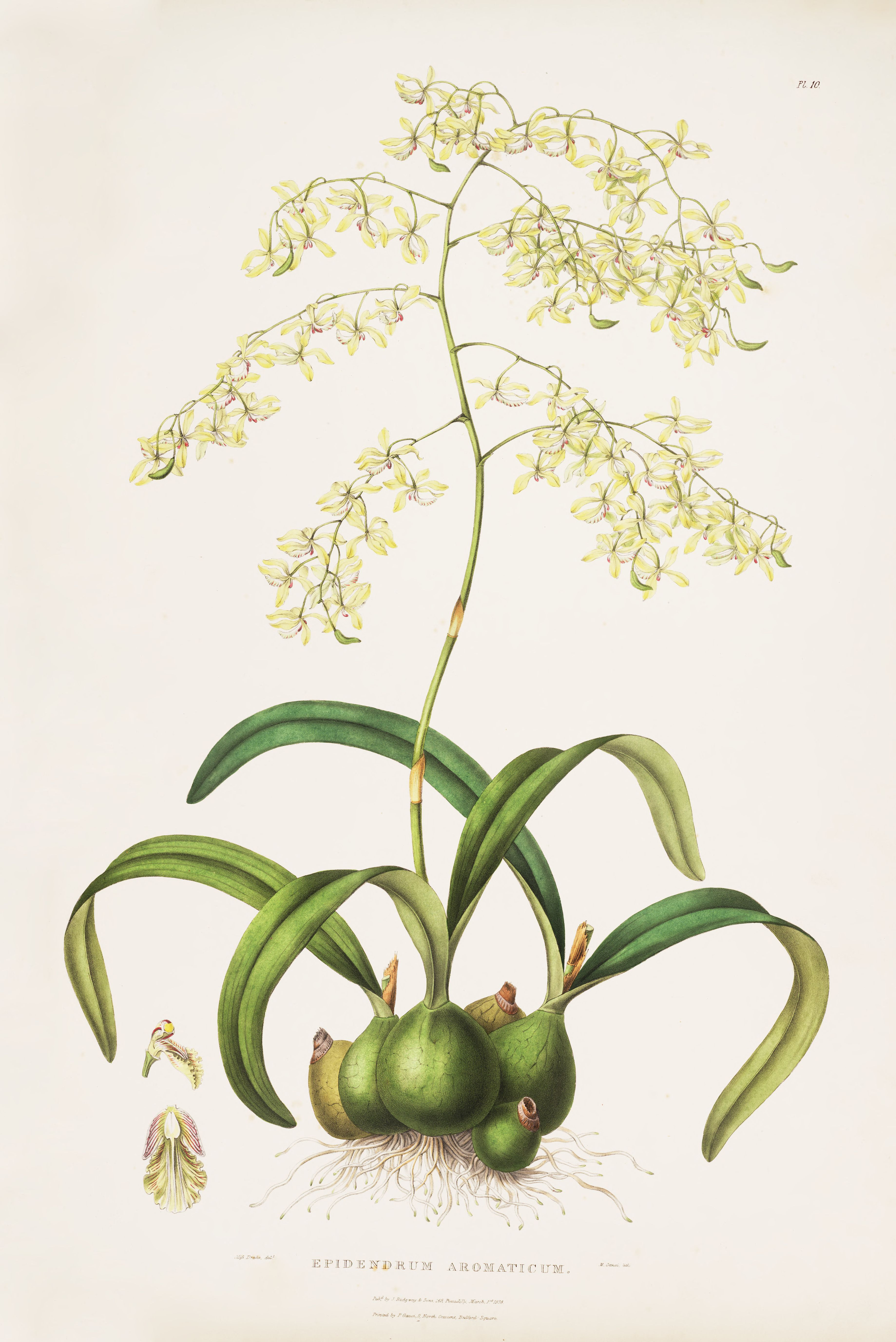

Scientific classification
- Kingdom: Plantae
- Clade: Tracheophytes
- Clade: Angiosperms
- Clade: Monocots
- Order: Asparagales
- Family: Orchidaceae
- Subfamily: Epidendroideae
- Genus: Encyclia
- Species: E. incumbens

Binomial name
- Encyclia incumbens (Lindl.) Mabb.

Synonyms
- Epidendrum incumbens Lindl. (Basionym); Epidendrum aromaticum Bateman; Encyclia aromatica Schltr.

= Encyclia incumbens =

Species of orchid

Encyclia incumbens is a species of orchid.
