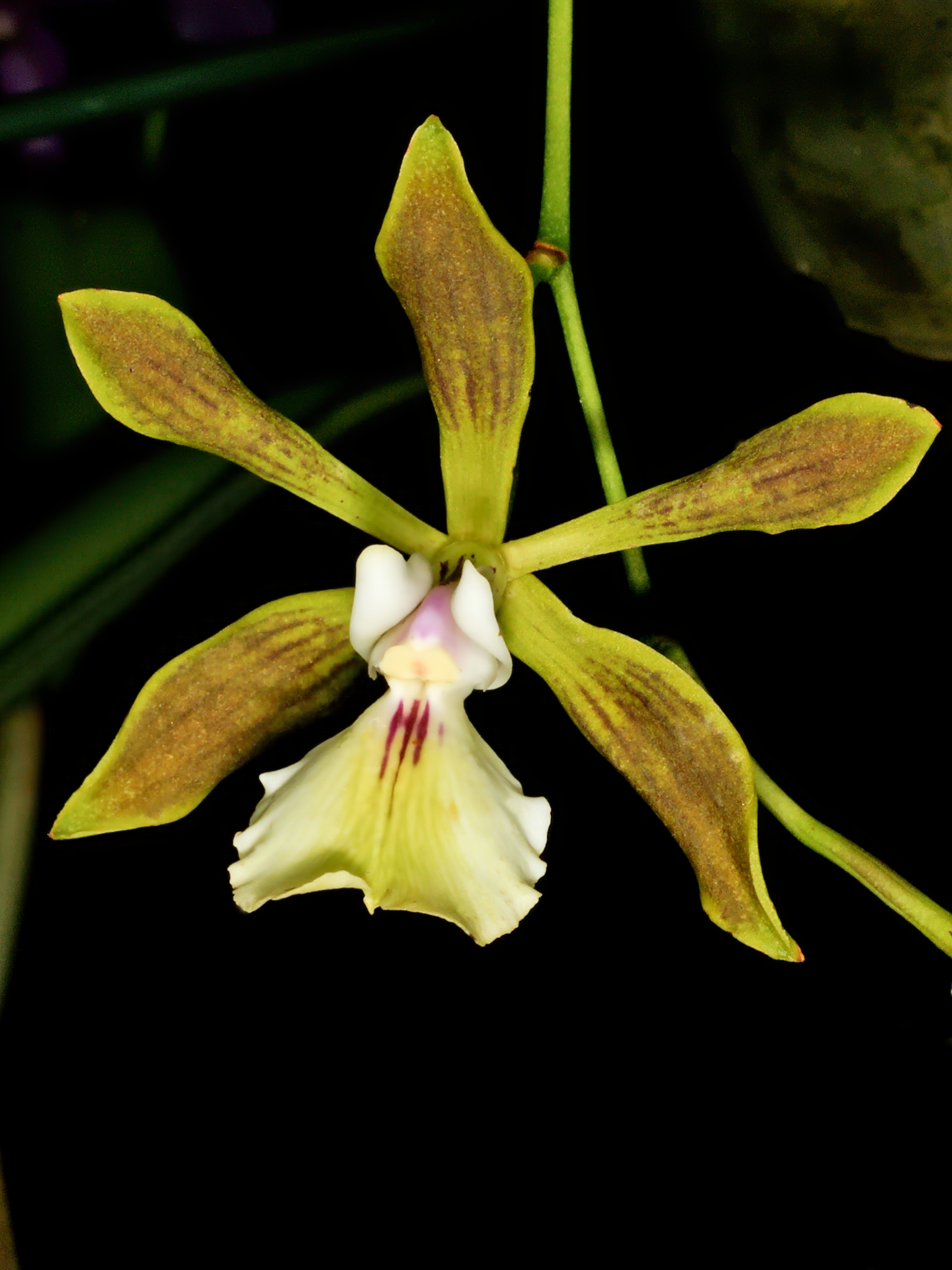

Scientific classification
- Kingdom: Plantae
- Clade: Tracheophytes
- Clade: Angiosperms
- Clade: Monocots
- Order: Asparagales
- Family: Orchidaceae
- Subfamily: Epidendroideae
- Genus: Encyclia
- Species: E. pyriformis

Binomial name
- Encyclia pyriformis (Lindl.) Schltr.

Synonyms
- Encyclia brevifolia (Jenn.) Ackerman & Múj.Benítez; Epidendrum pyriforme Lindl. (basionym); Epidendrum brevifolium Jenn.

= Encyclia pyriformis =

Species of orchid

Encyclia pyriformis is a species of orchid. It is a pseudobulbous epiphyte native to western Cuba including the Isla de la Juventud.

The species was first described as Epidendrum pyriforme by John Lindley in 1847. In 1914 Rudolf Schlechter renamed the species Encyclia pyriformis.
