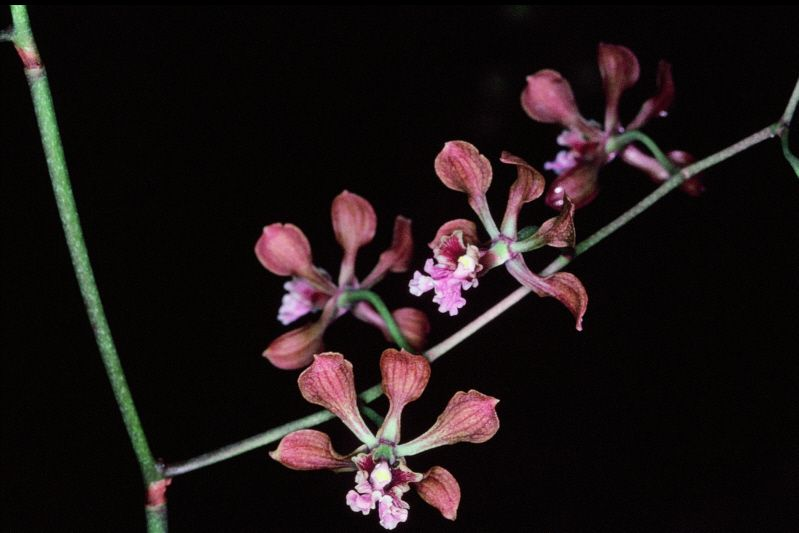

Scientific classification
- Kingdom: Plantae
- Clade: Embryophytes
- Clade: Tracheophytes
- Clade: Spermatophytes
- Clade: Angiosperms
- Clade: Monocots
- Order: Asparagales
- Family: Orchidaceae
- Subfamily: Epidendroideae
- Genus: Encyclia
- Species: E. hanburyi

Binomial name
- Encyclia hanburyi (Lindl.) Schltr.

Synonyms
- Epidendrum hanburyi Lindl. (1844) (basionym); (The variations Encyclia hanburii and Epidendrum hanburii are in use)

= Encyclia hanburyi =

Species of orchid

Encyclia hanburyi is a species of orchid.
