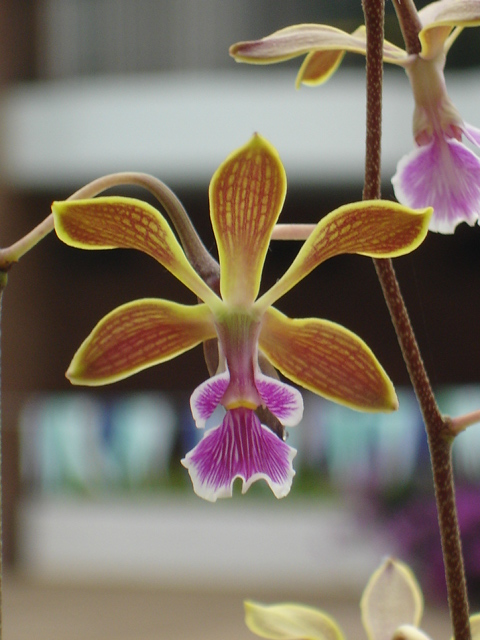

Scientific classification
- Kingdom: Plantae
- Clade: Tracheophytes
- Clade: Angiosperms
- Clade: Monocots
- Order: Asparagales
- Family: Orchidaceae
- Subfamily: Epidendroideae
- Genus: Encyclia
- Section: Encyclia sect. Hymenochila
- Species: E. oncidioides

Binomial name
- Encyclia oncidioides (Lindl.) Schltr.

Synonyms
- See text.

= Encyclia oncidioides =

Species of orchid

Encyclia oncidioides is a species of orchid. The diploid chromosome number of E. oncidioides has been determined as 2n = 40.

It has been placed in Encyclia sect. Hymenochila.

== Synonyms ==
- Epidendrum oncidioides Lindl. (Basionym)
- Epidendrum ensiforme Vell.
- Epidendrum gravidum Lindl.
- Epidendrum guillemianum Lindl. ex Planch.
- Epidendrum longifolium Barb.Rodr.
- Epidendrum sintenisii Rchb.f.
- Epidendrum monticola Fawc. & Rendle.
- Encyclia longifolia (Barb.Rodr.) Schltr.
- Encyclia gravida (Lindl.) Schltr.
- Encyclia sintenisii (Rchb.f.) Britton
- Epidendrum oncidioides var. gravidum (Lindl.) Ames
- Encyclia monticola (Fawc. & Rendle) Acuña
- Encyclia ensiformis (Vell.) Hoehne
- Encyclia oncidioides var. gravida (Lindl.) Hoehne
- Encyclia vellozoana Pabst
- Encyclia cardimii Pabst & A.F.Mello
