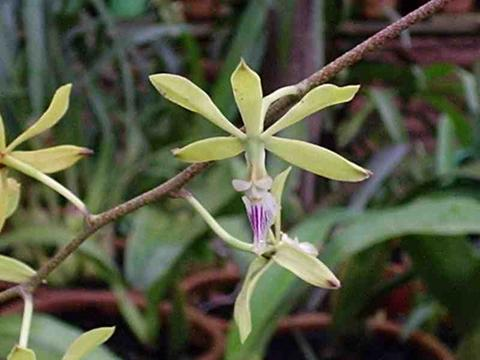

Scientific classification
- Kingdom: Plantae
- Clade: Tracheophytes
- Clade: Angiosperms
- Clade: Monocots
- Order: Asparagales
- Family: Orchidaceae
- Subfamily: Epidendroideae
- Genus: Encyclia
- Species: E. ceratistes

Binomial name
- Encyclia ceratistes (Lindl.) Schltr.

Synonyms
- Encyclia oncidioides var. ramonensis (Rchb.f.) Ames, F.T.Hubb. & C.Schweinf.; Encyclia powellii Schltr.; Encyclia ramonensis (Rchb.f.) Schltr.; Epidendrum ceratistes Lindl.; Epidendrum oncidioides var. ramonense (Rchb.f.) Ames, F.T.Hubb. & C.Schweinf.; Epidendrum ramonense Rchb.f.

= Encyclia ceratistes =

Species of orchid

Encyclia ceratistes, also known as Epidendrum ramonense or frosted rain, is a species of orchid. It is found in southeast and southwest Mexico, Central America (Costa Rica, El Salvador, Guatemala, Nicaragua and Panama) and the northern parts of South America (Colombia and Venezuela). E. ceratistes prefers hot-to-cool oak and mixed hardwood forests at 330 to 1600 m in elevation.
