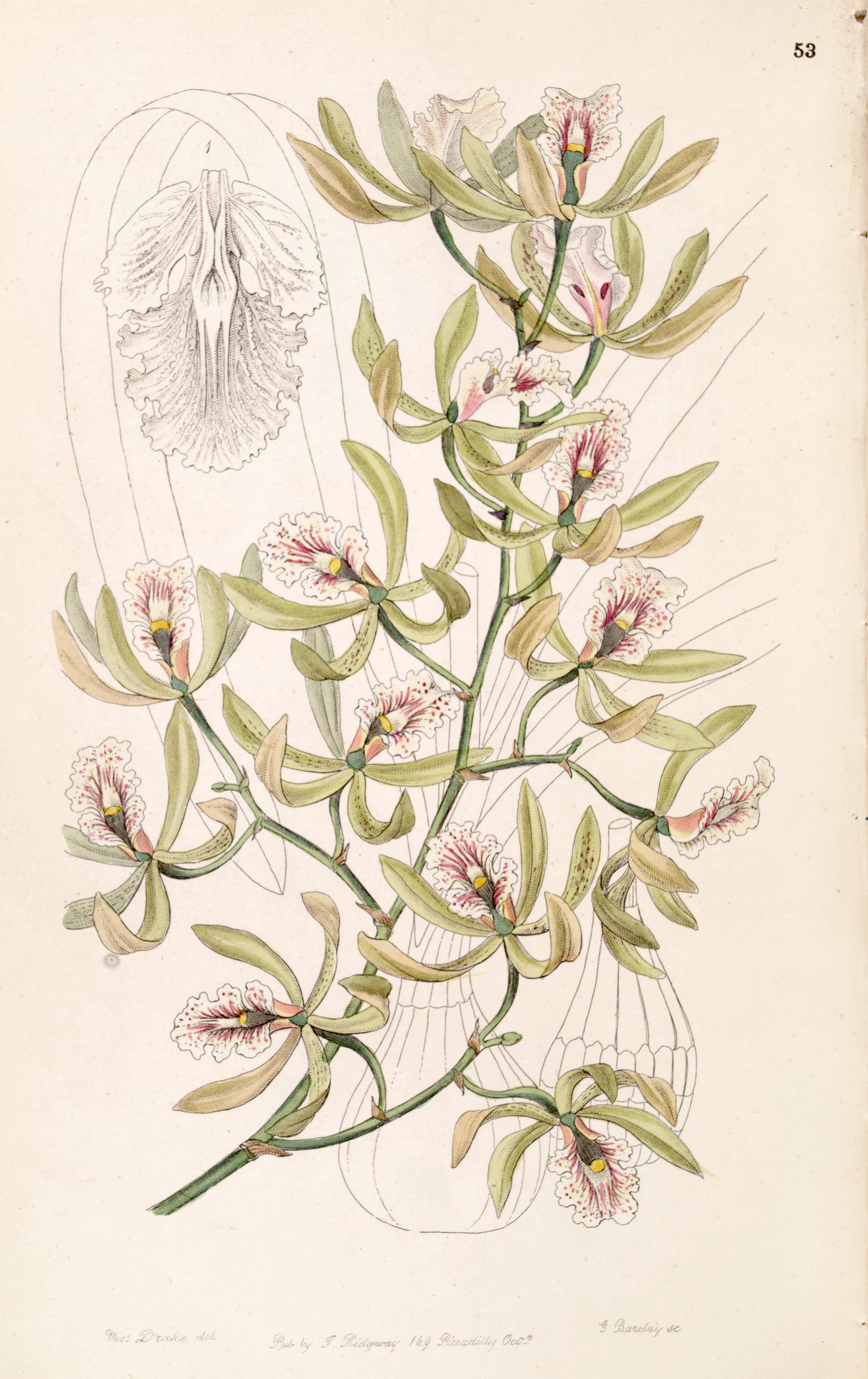

Scientific classification
- Kingdom: Plantae
- Clade: Tracheophytes
- Clade: Angiosperms
- Clade: Monocots
- Order: Asparagales
- Family: Orchidaceae
- Subfamily: Epidendroideae
- Genus: Encyclia
- Species: E. ambigua

Binomial name
- Encyclia ambigua (Lindl.) Schltr.

Synonyms
- Encyclia alborubra Archila, Chiron & Szlach.; Epidendrum alatum Lindl., nom. illeg.; Epidendrum ambiguum Lindl. (Basionym)

= Encyclia ambigua =

Species of orchid

Encyclia ambigua is a species of orchid native to Guatemala and southeast Mexico.
