= Encyclia diurna =

Scientific classification
- Kingdom: Plantae
- Clade: Tracheophytes
- Clade: Angiosperms
- Clade: Monocots
- Order: Asparagales
- Family: Orchidaceae
- Subfamily: Epidendroideae
- Genus: Encyclia
- Species: E. diurna

Binomial name
- Encyclia diurna (Jacq.) Schltr.

Synonyms
- Cymbidium diurnum (Jacq.) Sw.; Cymbidium glandulosum Kunth; Encyclia glandulosa (Kunth) P.Ortiz; Encyclia virens Schltr., nom. superfl.; Encyclia wageneri (Klotzsch) Schltr.; Epidendrum diurnum (Jacq.) Poir.; Epidendrum glandulosum (Kunth) Garay, nom. illeg.; Epidendrum virens Lindl., nom. illeg.; Epidendrum wageneri Klotzsch; Limodorum diurnum Jacq.

Species of orchid

Encyclia diurna is a species of flowering plant in the family Orchidaceae, native to Costa Rica and Panama in Central America, and to north Brazil, Colombia, French Guiana, Guyana, Suriname and Venezuela in South America. It was first described in 1853.
