= Epidendrum amictum =

Epidendrum amictum Linden & Rchb.f., synonym Encyclia amicta (Linden & Rchb.f.) Schltr., is an "unplaced" species of orchid according to Plants of the World Online, as of December 2023.
