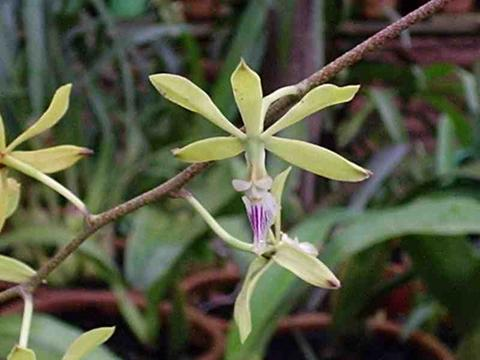
- Encyclia ceratistes

Scientific classification
- Kingdom: Plantae
- Clade: Tracheophytes
- Clade: Angiosperms
- Clade: Monocots
- Order: Asparagales
- Family: Orchidaceae
- Subfamily: Epidendroideae
- Tribe: Epidendreae
- Subtribe: Laeliinae
- Genus: Encyclia; Hook.

Type species
- Encyclia viridiflora Hook. Bot. Mag. 55: t. 2831 (1828)

Species
- See List of Encyclia species and hybrids

Synonyms
- Doxosma Raf.; Sulpitia Raf.

= Encyclia =

Genus of orchids

Encyclia is also a Greek term for the Codex Encyclius

Encyclia is a genus of orchids. The genus name comes from Greek enkykleomai ("to encircle"), referring to the lateral lobes of the lip which encircle the column. It is abbreviated as E. in the horticultural trade.

== Biology ==
The epiphytic genus Encyclia occurs in Florida, the Caribbean, Mexico, and other regions of the tropical Americas. It grows in lowland forests at altitudes up to 1000 meters. The distribution of the species is more or less evenly spread throughout this area. Most of these species are found in seasonally dry forests where the humidity tends to remain high throughout the year, though precipitation is infrequent, sometimes lacking for months. They are most common in dry oak forests.

Most species have stiff, drought-resistant leaves and large onion-shaped pseudobulbs. The flowers arise from an apical inflorescence. This genus is pollinated by bees and birds. There are normally eight pollinia, but in some subgroups this is reduced to four. One species, Encyclia cyperifolia, produces cylindrical, terete leaves.

== Cultivation ==
Many species in this genus are cultivated as ornamental plants. The flowers may last over a month. They are easily overwatered and require only a periodic misting during the winter.

Some species are fragrant; Encyclia fragrans produces vanilla-scented flowers.

The plants have continuously growing rhizomes that eventually create a large mass. In the wild the plants shed the older pseudobulbs. In cultivation they may fail to split, so growers will divide them by hand to prevent the plants from forming unwieldy mounds. An exception is Encyclia tampensis, which does well in a mounded form and does not need to be divided.

== Taxonomy ==
Cladistic research has shown that Encyclia sensu stricto is monophyletic. This genus was originally included in Epidendrum until William Jackson Hooker separated it in 1828.

The genera Euchile, Prosthechea and Dinema were separated from Encyclia based on morphological analysis. Sulpitia Raf. is a synonym of Encyclia.

Encyclia can hybridize with related genera. E. tampensis is often bred for its attractive hybrids.

== Species ==
See List of Encyclia species.

Unplaced species include Encyclia amicta, syn. Epidendrum amictum.
