= List of invasive fungi =

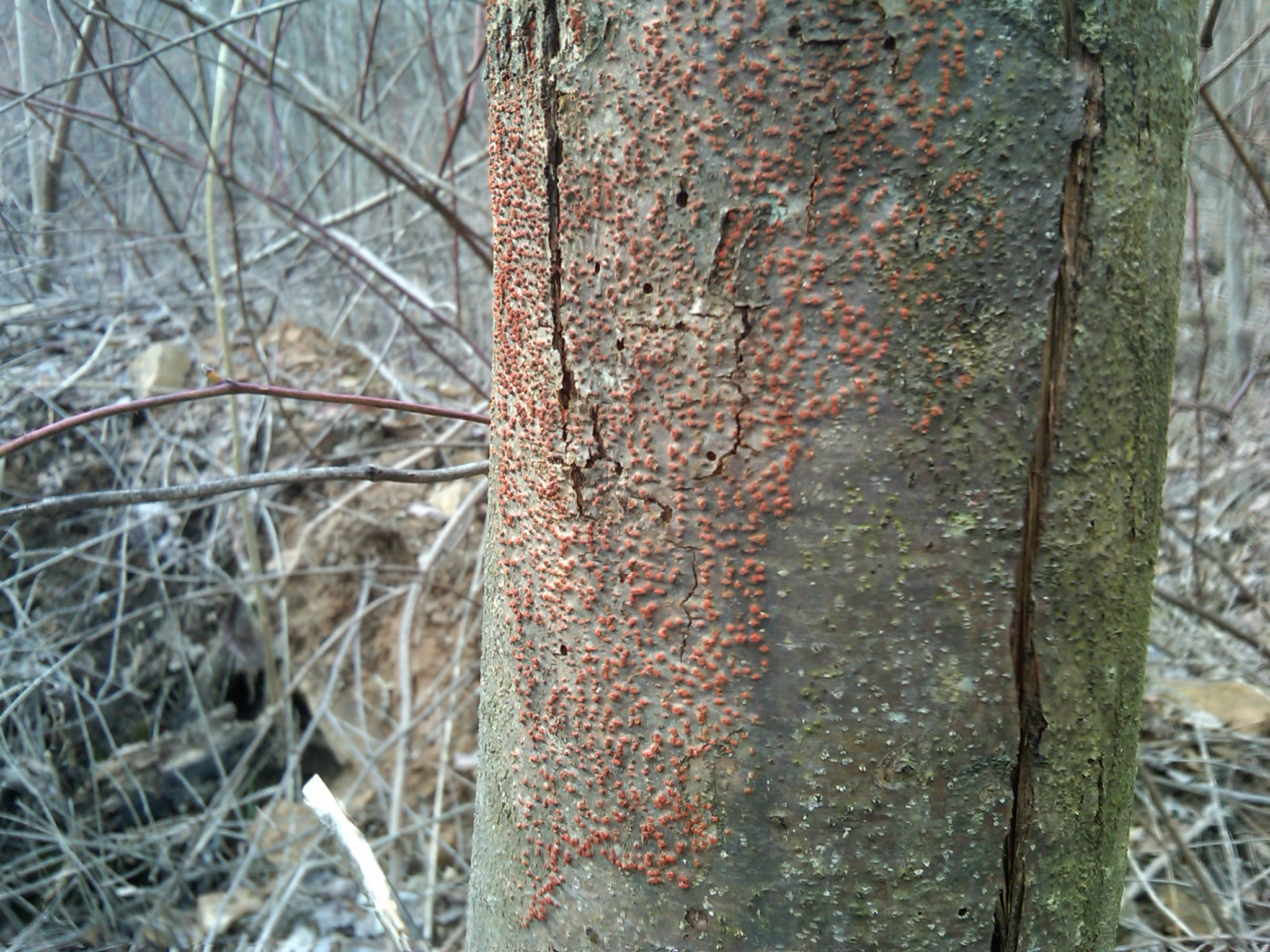
Chestnut blight from Cryphonectria parasitica

Some fungi are considered invasive species in certain parts of the world:

- Amanita muscaria
- Amanita phalloides
- Batrachochytrium dendrobatidis
- Batrachochytrium salamandrivorans
- Carpenterella
- Cryphonectria parasitica – causes chestnut blight
- Cucumispora dikerogammari
- Geosmithia morbida which, in partnership with the walnut twig beetle Pityophthorus juglandis, causes thousand cankers disease
- Heterobasidion irregulare
- Hymenoscyphus fraxineus
- Ophiognomonia clavigignenti-juglandacearum
- certain Ophiostoma species which cause Dutch elm disease
  - Ophiostoma ulmi
  - Ophiostoma himal-ulmi
  - Ophiostoma novo-ulmi
- Pleurotus citrinopileatus
- Pseudogymnoascus destructans
- Puccinia horiana – causes Chrysanthemum white rust
- Puccinia psidii
- Pucciniastrum americanum
- Uredo rangelii
- Suillus and Rhizopogon are considered invasive in parts of the Southern Hemisphere, as they promote Pinaceae tree invasion.
