= Coleophora juglandella =

Scientific classification
- Kingdom: Animalia
- Phylum: Arthropoda
- Class: Insecta
- Order: Lepidoptera
- Family: Coleophoridae
- Genus: Coleophora
- Species: C. juglandella

Binomial name
- Coleophora juglandella McDunnough, 1946

Species of moth

Coleophora juglandella is a moth of the family Coleophoridae. It is found in Canada, including Ontario.

The larvae feed on the leaves of Juglans nigra. They create a spatulate leaf case.
