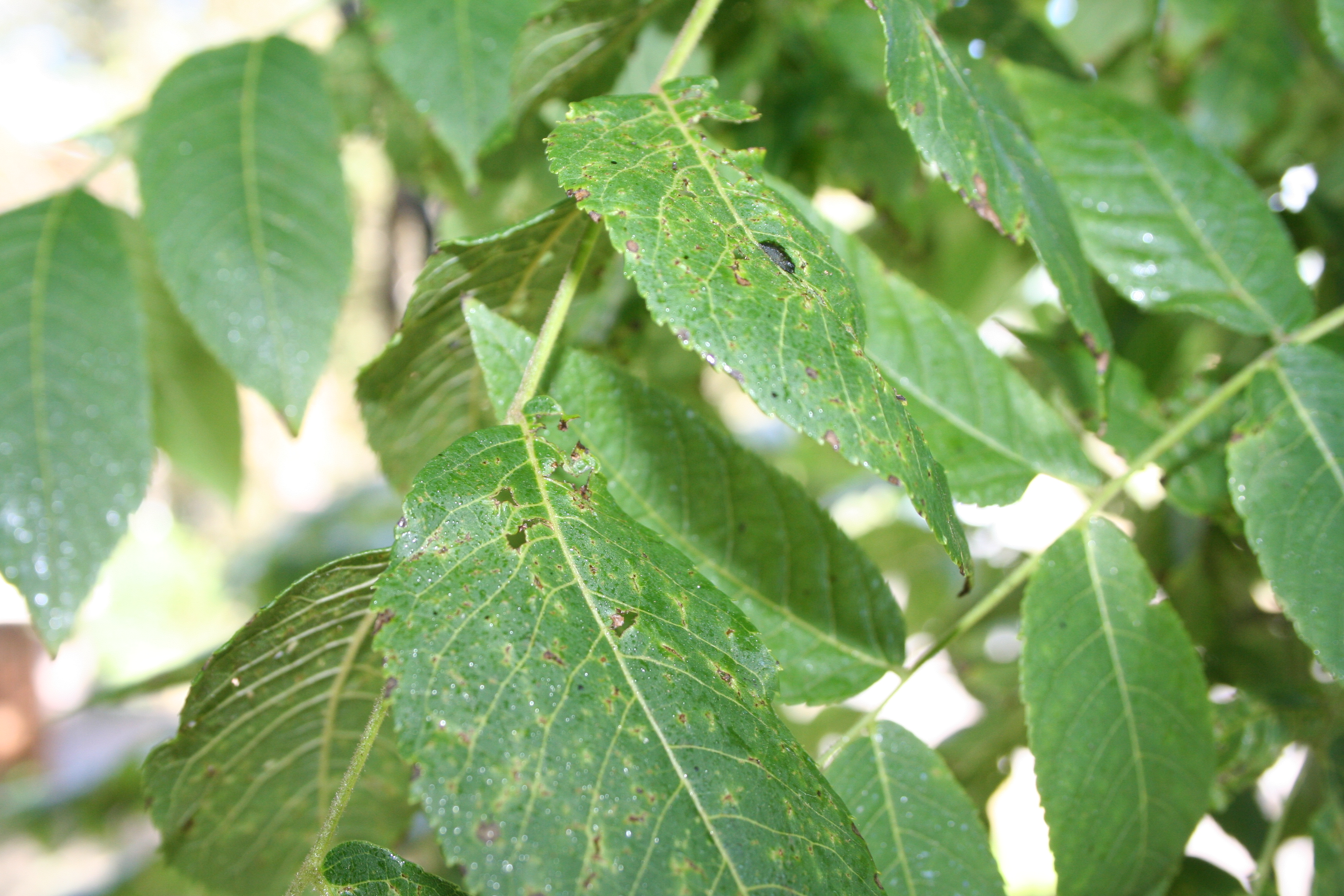
- Geosmithia morbida on leaves of black walnut

Scientific classification
- Kingdom: Fungi
- Division: Ascomycota
- Class: Sordariomycetes
- Order: Hypocreales
- Family: Bionectriaceae
- Genus: Geosmithia; Pitt (1979)

Type species
- Geosmithia lavendula (Raper & Fennell) Pitt (1979)

= Geosmithia =

Genus of fungi

Geosmithia is a genus of anamorphic fungi of uncertain familial placement in the order Hypocreales. The genus, circumscribed by Australian mycologist John Pitt in 1979, is widely distributed. A 2008 estimate placed ten species in the genus, but several new species have since been described. Thousand cankers disease, which affects economically important black walnut (Juglans nigra) populations in North America, is caused by Geosmithia morbida.

Species in the genus are generally similar to those in Penicillium, but can be distinguished from them by forming cylindrical conidia from rough-walled phialides. Additionally, the conidia of Geosmithia do not have a green color, in contrast to the characteristic blue-grey or green-grey conidia of Penicillium. Some Geosmithia species have teleomorphic forms that are classified in the genus Talaromyces. However, Geosmithia is a polyphyletic taxon with evolutionary affinities to at least three groups of the euascomycete lineage within the Ascomycota. The generic name Geosmithia honors British mycologist George Smith.

== Species ==
As accepted by Species Fungorum;

- Geosmithia brunnea Y.T. Huang, M. Kolařík & Hulcr (2017)
- Geosmithia carolliae A.O.B. Cunha, A.R. Machado & Souza-Motta (2018)
- Geosmithia cnesini M. Kolařík & Kirkendall (2015)
- Geosmithia eburnea Yaguchi, Someya & Udagawa (1994)
- Geosmithia emersonii (Stolk) Pitt (1979)
- Geosmithia eupagioceri M. Kolařík (2010)
- Geosmithia fassatiae M. Kolařík, Kubátová & Pažoutová (2005)
- Geosmithia flava M. Kolařík, Kubátová & Pažoutová (2004)
- Geosmithia langdonii M. Kolařík, Kubátová & Pažoutová (2005)
- Geosmithia lavendula (Raper & Fennell) Pitt (1979)
- Geosmithia malachitea Yaguchi & Udagawa (1993)
- Geosmithia microcorthyli M. Kolařík (2010)
- Geosmithia morbida M. Kolařík, Freeland, C. Utley & Tisserat (2010)
- Geosmithia namyslowskii (K.W. Zaleski) Pitt (1979)
- Geosmithia obscura M. Kolařík, Kubátová & Pažoutová (2005)
- Geosmithia omnicola Pepori M. Kolařík, Bettini, Vettraino & Santini (2015)
- Geosmithia proliferans Y.T. Huang, M. Kolařík, Kasson & Hulcr (2017)
- Geosmithia putterillii (Thom) Pitt (1979)
- Geosmithia rufescens M. Kolařík (2010)
- Geosmithia swiftii Pitt (1979)
- Geosmithia tibetensis Y.M. Wu & T.Y. Zhang (2013)
- Geosmithia ulmacea Pepori, M. Kolařík, Bettini, Vettraino & Santini (2015)
- Geosmithia xerotolerans Rodr.-Andr., Cano & Stchigel (2018)

Former species;

- G. argillacea (Stolk, H.C. Evans & T. Nilsson) Pitt (1979) = Rasamsonia argillacea Aspergillaceae family
- G. cylindrospora (G. Sm.) Pitt (1979) = Rasamsonia cylindrospora Aspergillaceae
- G. pallida (G. Sm.) M. Kolařík, Kubátová & Pažoutová (2004) = Geosmithia putterillii
- G. viridis Pitt & A.D. Hocking (1985) = Talaromyces viridulus Aspergillaceae
