= Pseudopityophthorus asperulus =

Scientific classification
- Domain: Eukaryota
- Kingdom: Animalia
- Phylum: Arthropoda
- Class: Insecta
- Order: Coleoptera
- Suborder: Polyphaga
- Infraorder: Cucujiformia
- Family: Curculionidae
- Genus: Pseudopityophthorus
- Species: P. asperulus

Binomial name
- Pseudopityophthorus asperulus (LeConte, 1868)

Species of beetle

Pseudopityophthorus asperulus is a species of typical bark beetles in the family Curculionidae. It is found in North America.
