= Walnut twig beetle =

Scientific classification
- Kingdom: Animalia
- Phylum: Arthropoda
- Clade: Pancrustacea
- Class: Insecta
- Order: Coleoptera
- Suborder: Polyphaga
- Infraorder: Cucujiformia
- Superfamily: Curculionoidea
- Family: Curculionidae
- Genus: Pityophthorus
- Species: P. juglandis

Binomial name
- Pityophthorus juglandis Blackman, 1928

Species of beetle

Pityophthorus juglandis, also known as the walnut twig beetle, is a Scolytinae that feeds on several different species of walnut trees (Juglans). It is one of only a few species in the genus Pityophthorus that is associated with hardwoods and the only one associated with walnut trees.

== Description ==
Pityophthorus juglandis can easily be distinguished from other members of its genus. Curtis Utley, a researcher at Colorado State University, elaborates on these differences stating, "Among these differences there are the 4 to 6 concentric rows of asperities on the prothorax, usually broken and overlapping at the median line. The declivity at the end of the wing covers is steep, very shallowly bisulcate, and at the apex it is generally flattened with small granules." The walnut twig beetles' small size is common for its genus. Adult beetles average between 1.5 and 1.9 millimeters in length. Although little is known about the life-cycle of the walnut twig beetle, during experimentation with the beetle in a controlled environment, the lifespan of one generation of walnut twig beetles was seven weeks after logs of black walnut, Juglans nigra, were harvested from the wild in May, marking what scientists think is the beginning of the feeding season of the walnut twig beetle. Gatherings of the beetle in sections of the walnut tree are known as galleries. The outward appearance of the walnut above these galleries seemed normal except for small beetle entrance holes. In later stages of decline, beetle entrance holes and galleries were found scattered every 2 to 5 centimeters, essentially crippling the tree.

The walnut twig beetle is commonly associated with the fungus Geosmithia morbida that causes damage ranging from discoloration in some species of walnuts to mortality in others. "Thousand cankers disease" was given its name because of the magnitude of galleries and subsequent cankers created by the disturbance regime of walnut twig beetles and Geosmithia morbida. The black walnuts only survived for several years after the start of feeding by the walnut twig beetle. However other species of walnut that are more regenerative towards Geosmithia morbida allowed the walnut twig beetle to feed for longer.

== Origin and subsequent spread of species ==
The walnut twig beetle was first recorded in 1928 in Arizona inhabiting the Arizona walnut tree, Juglans major. The movement of this insect from Arizona to the surrounding areas was recorded in 1959 in Los Angeles when the walnut twig beetle was collected from both the black walnut and the native southern California black walnut, J. californica. Recently the beetle and fungus have spread to areas of the United States with much colder climates. In Denver, Colorado during 2001 the first cases of black walnut mortality due to cankerous sores caused by the walnut twig beetle and the fungus, G. morbida, which the walnut twig beetle carries, were recorded, and by 2008 nearly all of the black walnuts in Denver, Colorado had been eliminated. A similar instance occurred during this same time period in Delta, a city nearly four hundred kilometers west of Denver. Bark beetles are a major natural disturbance in North American forests, in recent history affecting more area annually than fire does.

== Association with Geosmithia morbida ==
The walnut twig beetle is not the first bark beetle to be associated with a species of Geosmithia. The deaths of black walnut trees associated with the walnut twig beetle are not caused by the beetle but instead G. morbida. The origin of G. morbida is not known, but experts strongly believe that its emergence is connected to the walnut tree beetle and the Arizona walnut tree, and was not caused by the transfer of the disease from another area but instead by an evolutionary change in a similar species of fungi that inhabited closely to where the beetle was first identified. The fungus and beetle have developed a symbiotic relationship in which the fungus allows itself to be eaten by the beetle in return for a ride to the fungus's next host. The walnut twig beetle's hard shell covers two wings, and because the beetle can fly, G. morbida is reliant on the walnut twig beetle to be spread across distances, making the fungus entomochoric, or completely dependent upon the walnut twig beetle for dispersal, and only found in habitats containing the beetle.

=== Human prevention of spread ===
Human intervention in disturbances related to tree extinction because of infectious disease or invasive wildlife has historically been costly and therefore limited at best. Pruning a tree is one way humans combat fungi spread by bark beetles, and has been the reported course of action to take when dealing with similar fungi such as the Dutch elm disease. Bark beetles usually feast on limbs no greater than 10 centimetres (3.9 inches) in diameter, spreading Dutch elm disease to a place that is still manageable to prune. However, the walnut twig beetle is not limited to attacking the limbs. Because the beetle can attack the trunk, pruning is rendered useless. In 2010, an outbreak of both G. morbida and the walnut twig beetle was identified in the community of Knoxville, Tennessee, threatening over 27 million black walnuts in Tennessee alone. The establishment of quarantine in the area was enacted, denoting a most drastic need to stop the spread of the disease. Since then several other states have enacted an exterior state quarantine in order to stop the spread of these pests into their states. Currently the most successful cure for G. morbida is the insertion of sterile agar into the site of the infection. However, since the magnitude of the number of holes in one tree bored by the walnut tree beetle is so great, this method does not seem to be an effective solution either. Community officials claim that the best thing people can do is not transport firewood, limiting the human spread of the disease.
