= Pseudopityophthorus minutissimus =

Scientific classification
- Kingdom: Animalia
- Phylum: Arthropoda
- Clade: Pancrustacea
- Class: Insecta
- Order: Coleoptera
- Suborder: Polyphaga
- Infraorder: Cucujiformia
- Family: Curculionidae
- Genus: Pseudopityophthorus
- Species: P. minutissimus

Binomial name
- Pseudopityophthorus minutissimus (Zimmermann, 1868)

Species of beetle

Pseudopityophthorus minutissimus, the oak bark beetle, is a species of typical bark beetle in the family Curculionidae.
