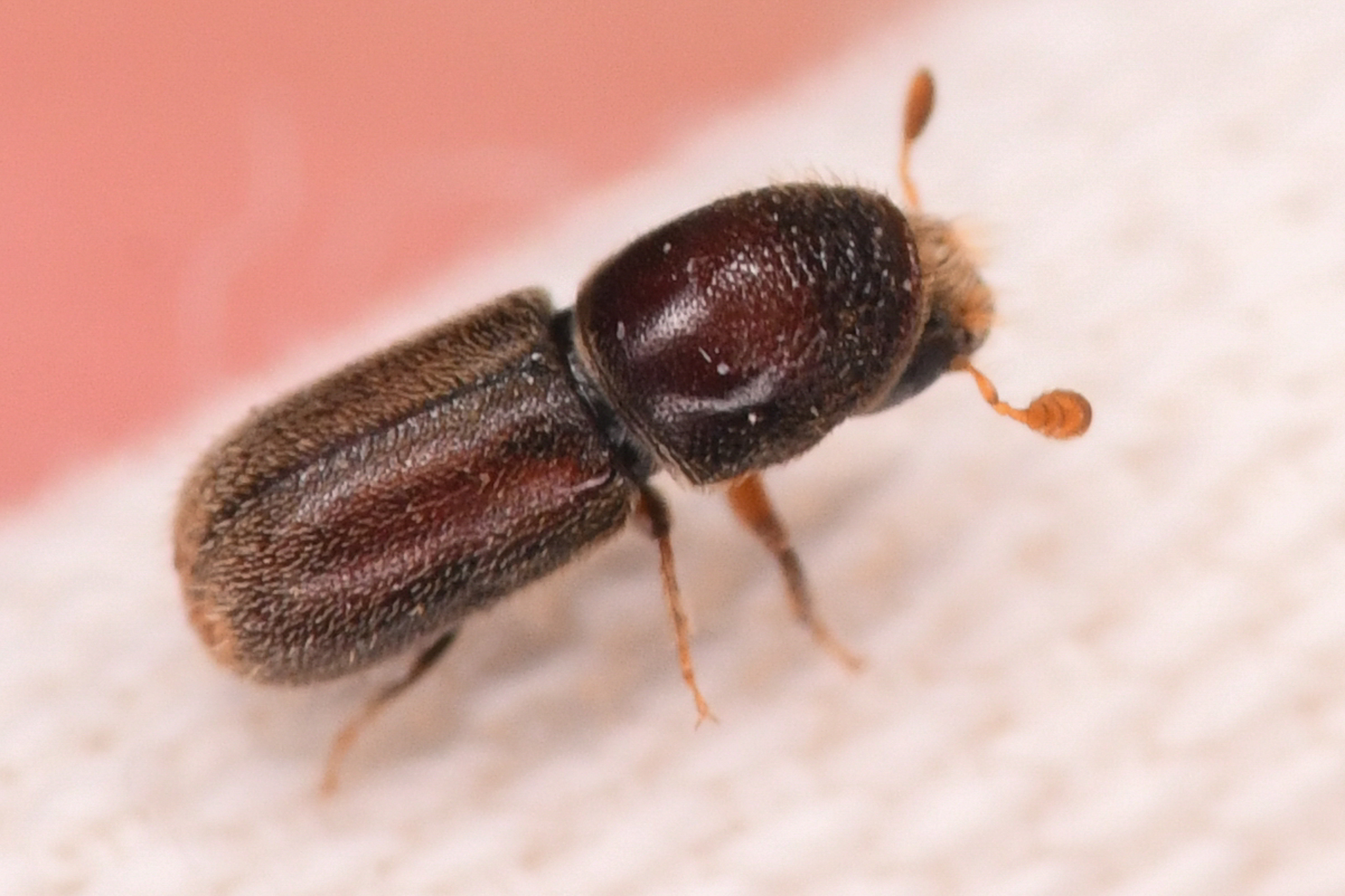
- Pseudopityophthorus pruinosus, California

Scientific classification
- Domain: Eukaryota
- Kingdom: Animalia
- Phylum: Arthropoda
- Class: Insecta
- Order: Coleoptera
- Suborder: Polyphaga
- Infraorder: Cucujiformia
- Family: Curculionidae
- Subfamily: Scolytinae
- Tribe: Scolytini
- Subtribe: Pityophthorina
- Genus: Pseudopityophthorus; Swaine, 1918

= Pseudopityophthorus =

Genus of beetles

Pseudopityophthorus is a genus of bark and ambrosia beetles in the family Curculionidae. There are more than 30 described species in Pseudopityophthorus, found mainly in North and Central America.

== Species ==
These 39 species belong to the genus Pseudopityophthorus:

- Pseudopityophthorus absitus Bright, 2019
- Pseudopityophthorus acuminatus Bright, 1972
- Pseudopityophthorus aesculinus Bright, 1972
- Pseudopityophthorus agrifoliae Blackman, 1931
- Pseudopityophthorus asperulus (LeConte, 1868)
- Pseudopityophthorus cincinnatus Wood & Bright, 1992
- Pseudopityophthorus colombianus Wood, 1971
- Pseudopityophthorus comosus Bright, 1972
- Pseudopityophthorus convexus Bright, 1972
- Pseudopityophthorus curtus Bright, 1972
- Pseudopityophthorus declivis Wood, 1971
- Pseudopityophthorus denticulus Wood, 1977
- Pseudopityophthorus durangoensis Wood, 1987
- Pseudopityophthorus fagi Blackman, 1931
- Pseudopityophthorus festivus Wood, 1974
- Pseudopityophthorus gracilis Blackman, 1921
- Pseudopityophthorus granulatus Blackman, 1931
- Pseudopityophthorus granulifer Wood, 1967
- Pseudopityophthorus hirsutus Bright, 1972
- Pseudopityophthorus hispidus Eggers, 1930
- Pseudopityophthorus hondurensis Wood, 1967
- Pseudopityophthorus limbatus Eggers, 1930
- Pseudopityophthorus micans Wood, 1967
- Pseudopityophthorus minutissimus (Zimmermann), 1868
- Pseudopityophthorus montanus Bright, 1972
- Pseudopityophthorus opacicollis Blackman, 1931
- Pseudopityophthorus peregrinus Wood & Yin, 1986
- Pseudopityophthorus pruinosus (Eichhoff), 1878
- Pseudopityophthorus pubescens Blackman, 1931
- Pseudopityophthorus pubipennis (LeConte), 1860
- Pseudopityophthorus pulvereus Blackman, 1931
- Pseudopityophthorus singularis Wood, 1971
- Pseudopityophthorus squamosus Bright, 1972
- Pseudopityophthorus tenuis Wood, 1959
- Pseudopityophthorus tropicalis Wood, 1967
- Pseudopityophthorus truncatus Bright, 1972
- Pseudopityophthorus virilis Wood, 1971
- Pseudopityophthorus xalapae Wood, 1987
- Pseudopityophthorus yavapaii Blackman, 1931
