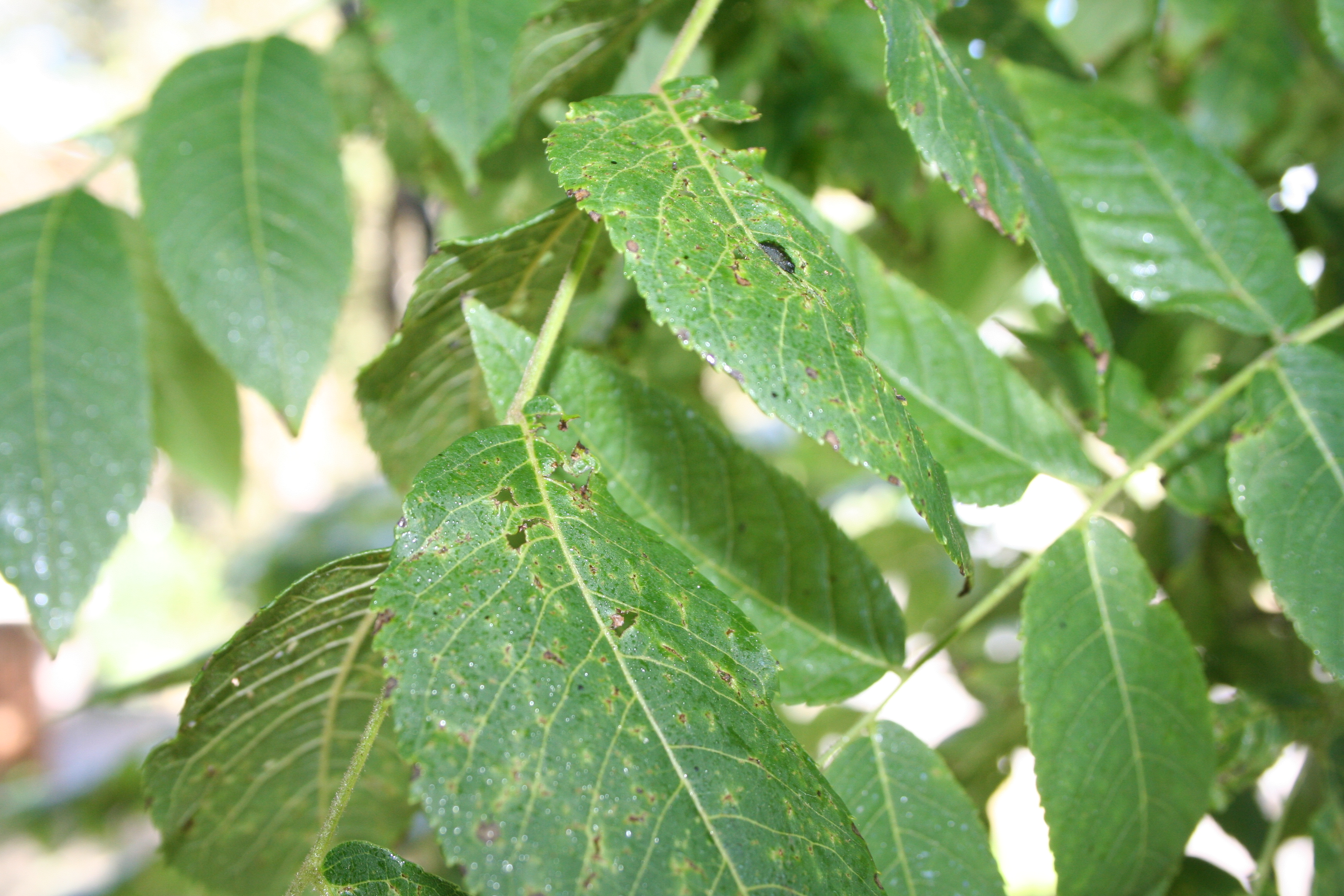
- Signs of Geosmithia morbida and possibly a walnut twig beetle (Pityophthorus juglandis) on Black Walnut (Juglans nigra)

Scientific classification
- Kingdom: Fungi
- Division: Ascomycota
- Class: Sordariomycetes
- Order: Hypocreales
- Family: Bionectriaceae
- Genus: Geosmithia
- Species: G. morbida

Binomial name
- Geosmithia morbida M.Kolařík, E.Freeland, C.Utley, & Tisserat 2010

= Geosmithia morbida =

Species of fungus

Geosmithia morbida is a mitosporic ascomycete fungus belonging to the order Hypocreales and the family Bionectriaceae. This fungus is recognized as the causal agent of Thousand Cankers Disease (TCD), a significant threat to walnut trees. The disease derives its name from the multitude of coalescing cortical cankers that develop around the entrance holes created by its insect vector, the walnut twig beetle (Pityophthorus juglandis). The relationship between Geosmithia morbida and Pityophthorus juglandis is symbiotic, with the beetle carrying the fungal conidia on its body and introducing them to healthy walnut trees as it bores through the bark. While the greatest damage is observed on black walnuts (Juglans nigra).

== Invasiveness ==
TCD was first seen in the western United States. In 2010 it was found in Tennessee, which was the first time it appeared in the eastern part of the country. This raised worries because the eastern US has many native black walnut trees, which seem to be very susceptible to TCD. Black walnut trees are important for the economy, the environment, and even socially. Scientists are trying to figure out exactly where TCD and the walnut twig beetle are in the United States. To help with this, the United States Department of Agriculture (USDA) has been funding efforts since 2012 to set up traps for the walnut twig beetle in eastern and central states.

Originally described from scattered locations in the western United States, the harmful association between G. morbida and P. juglandis was clarified in the USA in 2009, explaining the severe dieback observed in walnut species since the 1990s. In 2013, both the pathogen and its vector were reported for the first time in Europe and in Italy. Since then, the disease has been detected in other Italian regions, making Italy the current only foothold of TCD outside North America. This discovery has raised significant concerns across Europe due to the economic, social, and environmental value of walnut cultivation.

Traditional identification of Geosmithia morbida can be challenging as the fungus grows slowly in culture and can be easily overgrown by other microorganisms. Consequently, molecular methods, such as qPCR assays, have been developed for rapid, accurate, and highly specific detection of both the fungus and its beetle vector. The emergence of TCD in Europe is a relatively recent problem, and ongoing research focuses on understanding the bio-ecology, diagnosis, population dynamics, and management of this invasive alien species complex in the European and Mediterranean region. The development of effective detection and identification procedures is crucial to prevent the further spread of this damaging disease.

== Pathogenicity ==
Two species of Geosmithia are known to be pathogenic, G. pallidia and G. morbida, serving as pathogens to oak (Quercus) and eastern black walnut (J. nigra). It is currently unclear as to how these two species serve as pathogens to new host trees while other members of the genus remain saprotrophic.

To examine the evolutionary genetic influences of how G. morbida became a pathogen, researchers compared the genome of G. morbida to the genomes of two closely related species (G. flava and G. putterillii) and found that G. morbida has a significantly small genome, approximately 14kb compared to 16kb (G. flava) and 20kb (G. putterillii). Further analysis of their genomes revealed that G. morbida had a significantly higher percentage of predicted proteases in its genome. Smaller genome reads and increased protease synthesis/diversity are fairly common for fungal and prokaryotic pathogens as they must adapt to their vectors (bark beetles) and hosts simultaneously.

== Dispersal & Mechanism ==
A gene has been found called geo1 found in different types of Geosmithia fungi. The geo1 gene is like a recipe for making a protein called GEO1, which belongs to a family of proteins called hydrophobins. These hydrophobins have a special coating that helps the fungus interact with its environment, like sticking to insects that might carry it around. When the scientists tried to build a "family tree" of the Geosmithia fungi based on the geo1 gene, it did not match the family tree returned using Internal Transcribed Spacer (ITS) sequencing. This suggests that the geo1 gene might be evolving in response to specific environmental pressures, like the need to interact with certain insects. The geo1 gene seems to be under pressure to stay relatively the same over time, as changes that would alter the protein sequence are not very common. This is called purifying selection. The fact that some Geosmithia species that are not very closely related still have very similar geo1 genes could be due to strong purifying selection keeping the gene similar, or it could even be a sign of horizontal gene transfer happening between Geosmithia species. Research shows that while the geo1 gene, which helps Geosmithia fungi interact with their surroundings, is present in many species, there's interesting variation in its details and how much of the corresponding protein is produced. The way this gene is evolving might be linked to the different lifestyles and ecological roles of these fungi, possibly including their relationships with insects, and could even involve gene sharing between different Geosmithia species.

Environmental factors have been shown to play a role in not only the co-dispersal of the fungus and beetles but in their reproductive rates as well. It's important to note that without the walnut twig beetle, the fungus would have a very hard time infecting more trees. The walnut twig beetle's life cycle begins with the adult laying eggs on a black walnut tree, and larvae hatch from the eggs. The larvae burrow into the tree, and eat the phloem and cambium under the bark, leaving behind tunnels or "galleries" wherever they go. The larvae eventually will pupate and turn into adults. They will then chew their way out of the tree and fly on to lay eggs somewhere else. Geosmithia morbida grows within these galleries created by the larvae. The fungus feeds on the tree, killing the plant tissues as it grows.

New information reveals that some Geosmithia fungi that live on elm trees have somehow picked up a gene called cu from another fungus called Ophiostoma novo-ulmi. Ophiostoma novo-ulmi is the cause of Dutch Elm Disease. This acquisition of genes between different species of fungi is called horizontal gene transfer (HGT). The cu gene was found in many Geosmithia fungi that were taken from elm trees but not in those from other trees. Geosmithia got this gene from Ophiostoma novo-ulmi because their gene sequences are very similar. This likely happened recently in Europe, as these fungi live close together on elm trees. Even though the Geosmithia have this gene, they do not use it much. They make very little of the substance that this gene codes for. Because this gene transfer is so common, scientists think that the cu gene might just be a sign that Geosmithia and Ophiostoma novo-ulmi are swapping other genetic material too. This shows that the Geosmithia family of fungi has members with different lifestyles and impacts on trees.

A study on G. morbida in relation to moisture and the environment also shows that when G. morbida was grown in wood without any other fungi present, it could survive across a wide range of moisture levels. This suggests that the higher moisture does not directly link to killing G. morbida, but rather favors its competitor fungi such as Xylariaceae and Aspergillus spp. This competition in turn could help reduce TCD. However, with the other factor of the disease being the beetle vectors and temperatures rising, it's suggested that beetle population growth will only increase along with its symbiotic fungi. Overall, the drier climate in the western US gives the TCD-causing fungus a competitive edge, leading to more severe disease. The wetter climate in the eastern US favors other fungi that can keep the TCD fungus in check. As the climate changes, this balance could shift, potentially putting black walnut trees across their entire native range at greater risk.

== Management ==
Scientists in Italy developed new and improved ways to find and identify both the WTB and the G. morbida fungus. This is important because these are considered quarantine organisms in Europe, meaning it's crucial to track them to prevent the disease from spreading. In a study, scientists used special funnel traps placed on walnut trees. These traps were made better by adding a mesh to keep out dirt and bigger bugs and by attaching them firmly to the tree to stop them from swinging in the wind. Pheromones were used to attract the walnut twig beetles to the traps. Next, samples were taken from the beetle and from sick parts of the walnut trees. To grow the fungus in the lab, an antibiotic containing agar was used to prevent incidental contamination. After culturing, morphological analysis was performed to identify the sample as G. morbida. For a more certain identification, they used DNA tests to confirm it was Geosmithia morbida. They looked at the tiny beetles under a microscope to identify them based on their shape and other features. They also used DNA tests to be sure it was the walnut twig beetle. They also tested how well the fungus could grow at different temperatures. They found that it grows best at around 25°C (room temperature) and stops growing at 41°C.

This is important for understanding how the disease might spread in warmer areas. This research gives us better tools and methods to find and identify the bug and the fungus that cause Thousand Cankers Disease in Europe. This will help in monitoring the disease and trying to prevent it from spreading to more walnut trees.
