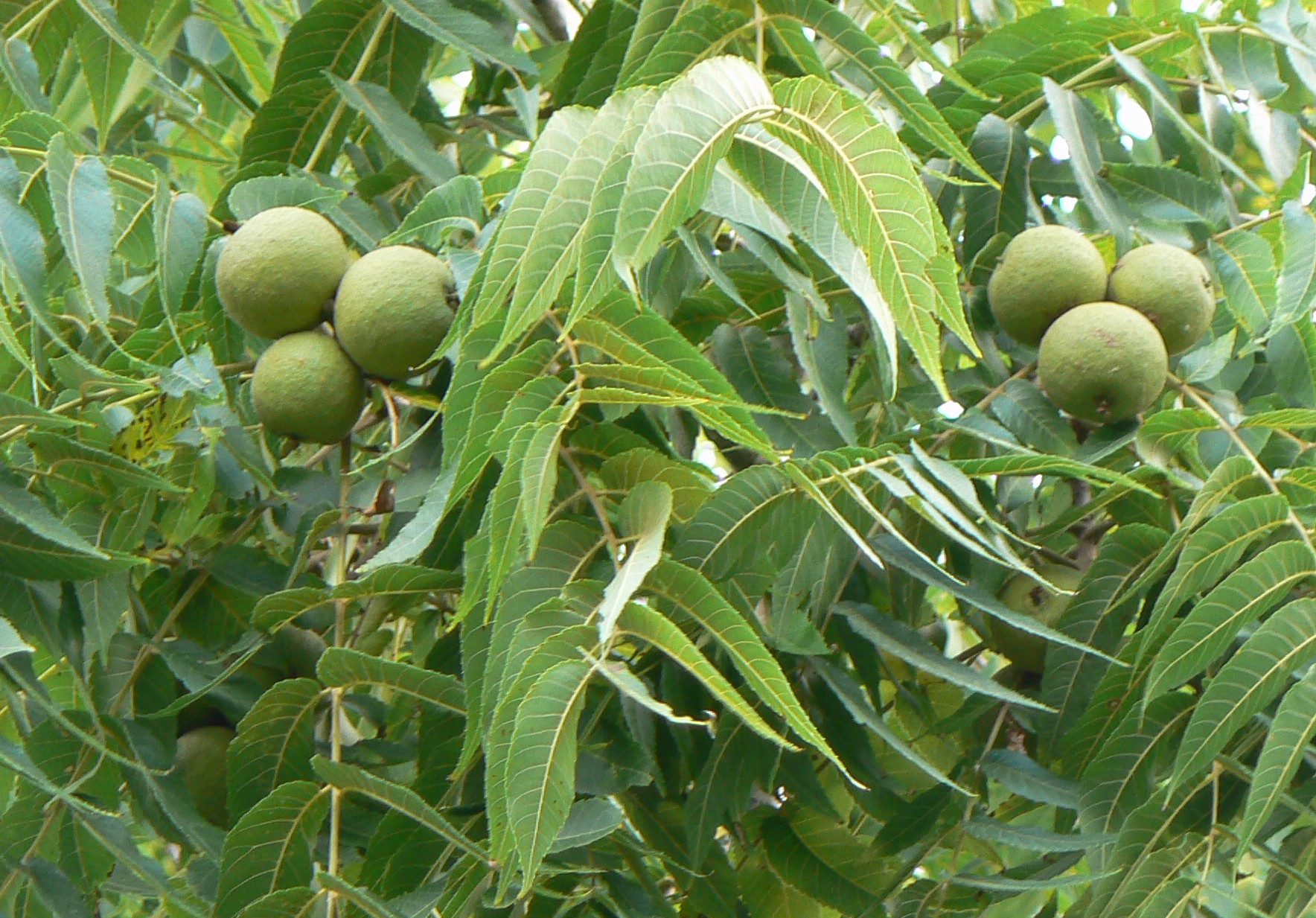
- Leaves and fruit

Conservation status
- Least Concern (IUCN 3.1)

- Secure (NatureServe)

Scientific classification
- Kingdom: Plantae
- Clade: Tracheophytes
- Clade: Angiosperms
- Clade: Eudicots
- Clade: Rosids
- Order: Fagales
- Family: Juglandaceae
- Genus: Juglans
- Section: Juglans sect. Rhysocaryon
- Species: J. nigra

Binomial name
- Juglans nigra L.
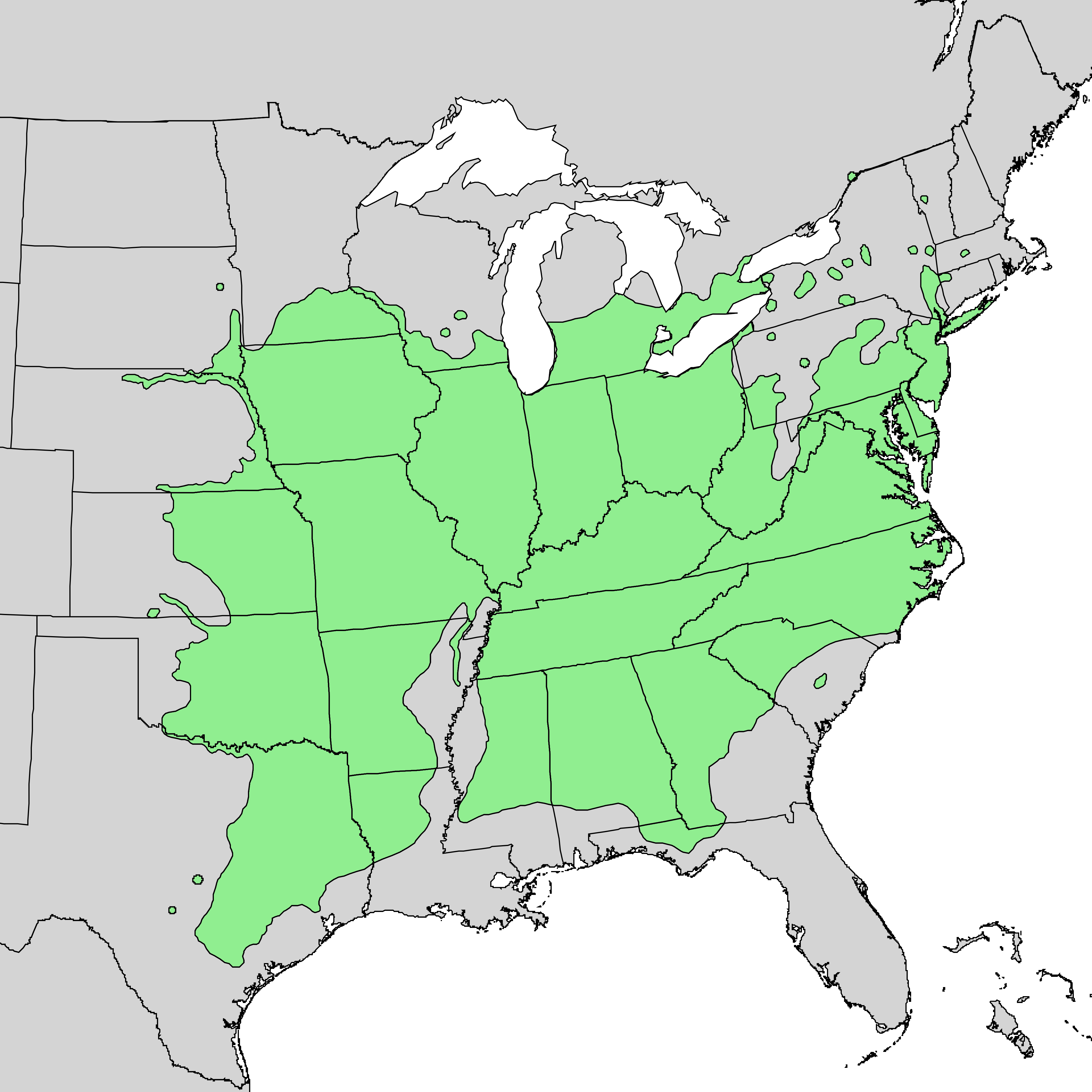
- Natural range

= Juglans nigra =

Eastern black walnut

Species of tree

Juglans nigra, the eastern American black walnut, is a species of deciduous tree in the walnut family, Juglandaceae, native to central and eastern North America, growing mostly in riparian zones.

Black walnut is an important tree commercially, as the wood is a deep brown color and easily worked. Walnut seeds (nuts) are cultivated for their distinctive and desirable taste. Walnut trees are grown for lumber and food, and processors have found additional markets for even the tough outer hulls by finely grinding them for use in products such as abrasive cleansers. Many cultivars have been developed for improved quality wood or nuts. In 2017, the United States Department of Agriculture valued U.S. walnut timber at $530 billion. A significant amount is grown in Missouri.

Black walnut is allelopathic, releasing chemicals from its roots and other tissues that may harm other organisms and give the tree a competitive advantage, but there is no scientific consensus that this is a primary competitive factor.

Black walnut is susceptible to thousand cankers disease, which provoked a decline of walnut trees in some regions.

== Description ==
The tree grows to 30–40 m (100–130 ft) tall. Under forest competition, it develops a tall and straight trunk. When grown in an open area it has a short trunk and broad crown. The bark is typically grey-black and deeply furrowed into thin ridges that gives the bark a diamond-shaped pattern.

The pith of the twigs is chambered and light brown. The buds are pale silky and covered in downy hairs. The terminal buds are ovate, and 8 mm (5/16 in) long, and slightly longer than broad, the lateral buds are smaller and superposed.

The leaves are pinnately compound and alternately arranged on the stem. They are 30–60 cm (1–2 ft) long, typically even-pinnate but there is heavy variation among leaves. The stems have 15–23 leaflets, when terminal leaf is included, with the largest leaflets located in the center, 7–10 cm (2 3/4–4 in) long and 2–3 cm (3/4–1 1/4 in) broad. The leaflets have a rounded base and a long pointed (acuminate) tip as well as having a serrated edge. The leaves are overall dark green in color and are typically hairy on the underside.

The leaf scar has three prominent bundle scars and has a notch on the side that points toward the tip of the branch (distal side).

Black walnut is monoecious. The male (staminate) flowers are in drooping catkins 8–10 cm (3 1/4–4 in) long. These are borne from axillary buds on the previous year's growth. The female (pistillate) flowers are terminal, in clusters of two to five on the current year's growth. During the summer/autumn, a spherical fruit (nut) ripens. It comprises a brownish-green, semifleshy husk and a brown, corrugated nut. The whole fruit, including the husk, falls in October; the seed is relatively small and very hard.

Most parts of the tree including leaves, stems, and fruit husks have a very characteristic pungent or spicy odor. This odor is lacking in the nut itself.

=== Similar species ===
J. cinerea (the butternut) is similar in leaf shape and range. The fruits are quite different, as black walnut fruits are spherical and butternuts are more oval-oblong. When a fruit is not available, two species can be differentiated based on the leaf scars: the butternut's has a flat upper edge and with a velvety ridge above that flat part, but black walnut's is indented with no hairy ridge.

== Distribution and habitat ==
The species is native to North America. It grows mostly in riparian zones, from southern Ontario, west to southeast South Dakota, south to Georgia, northern Florida and southwest to central Texas. Wild trees in the upper Ottawa Valley may be an isolated native population or may have derived from planted trees. The range of the black walnut is strongly correlated with low maximum vapour-pressure deficit.

== Ecology ==
Black walnut is primarily a pioneer species similar to red and silver maple and black cherry. Because of this, black walnut is a common weed tree found along roadsides, fields, and forest edges in the eastern US. It will grow in closed forests, but is classified as shade intolerant; this means it requires full sun for optimal growth and nut production.

Black walnut's native range extends across much of the eastern US. It is absent from the coastal plain south of North Carolina as well as the Mississippi Valley, and does not occur in the northern tier of the eastern US, where the frost-free season is too short for the nuts to develop. Its western range extends all the way to the eastern Great Plains, beyond which climate conditions become too dry for it.

Black walnut is one of the most abundant trees in the eastern US, particularly the Northeast, and its numbers are increasing due to epidemics that have affected other tree species, including emerald ash borer, chestnut blight, butternut canker, wooly hemlock adelgid, dogwood anthracnose, Dutch elm disease, and spongy moth infestations. Widespread clear-cutting of oaks due to spongy moth damage in the 1970s–1980s particularly aided in the tree's spread. The aggressive competitive strategy of black walnut such as its fast growth, alleopathic chemicals, and rodent-dispersed seeds, have also contributed.

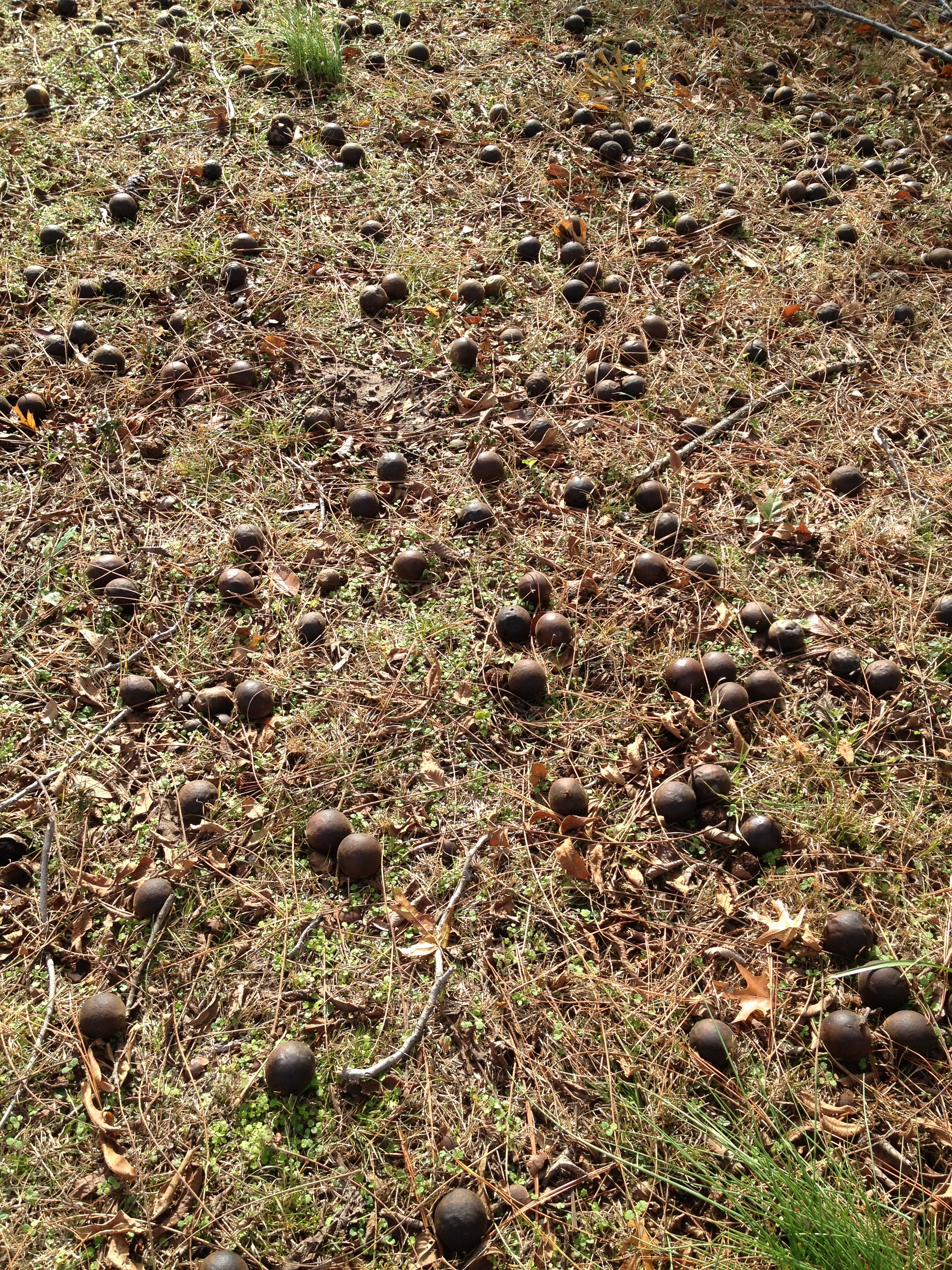
Walnuts fallen from a tree

The nuts are food for many rodents and make up to 10% of the diet of eastern fox squirrels. The nuts are also eaten by species of birds. The leaves are browsed by white tailed deer, although they are not a preferred food.

Where the range of the eastern black walnut overlaps that of the Texas black walnut (J. microcarpa), the two species sometimes interbreed, producing populations with characteristics intermediate between the two species. J. nigra and J. cinerea often grow in the same range as well but they do not hybridize naturally.

The tree's roots often form endomycorrhizal relationships with fungi in the genus Glomus. Some endomycorrhizal relations improve the plant's growth.

Species often associated with J. nigra include yellow-poplar (Liriodendron tulipifera), white ash (Fraxinus americana), black cherry (Prunus serotina), basswood (Tilia americana), American beech (Fagus grandifolia), sugar maple (Acer saccharum), oaks (Quercus spp.), and hickories (Carya spp.). Near the western edge of its range, black walnut may be confined to floodplains, where it grows either with American elm (Ulmus americana), common hackberry (Celtis occidentalis), green ash (Fraxinus pennsylvanica), and boxelder (Acer negundo), or with basswood and red oak (Quercus rubra) on lower slopes and other favorable sites.

=== Pests ===
Maggots (larvae of Rhagoletis completa and Rhagoletis suavis) in the husk are common, though more a nuisance than a serious problem for amateurs, who may simply remove the affected husk as soon as infestation is noticed. The maggots develop entirely within the husk, thus the quality of the nutmeat is not affected. However, infestations of maggots are undesirable because they make the husk difficult to remove and are unsightly. Maggots can be serious for commercial walnut growers, who tend to use chemical treatments to prevent damage to the crop. Some non-chemical controls also exist, such as removing and disposing of infested nuts.

The walnut weevil (Conotrachelus retentus) grows to 5 millimetres (3/16 in) long as an adult. The adult sucks plant juices through a snout. The eggs are laid in fruits in the spring and summer. Many nuts are lost due to damage from the larvae, which burrow through the nut shell.

Black walnut is affected by European canker (Neonectria galligena). The infection spreads slowly but infected trees eventually die.

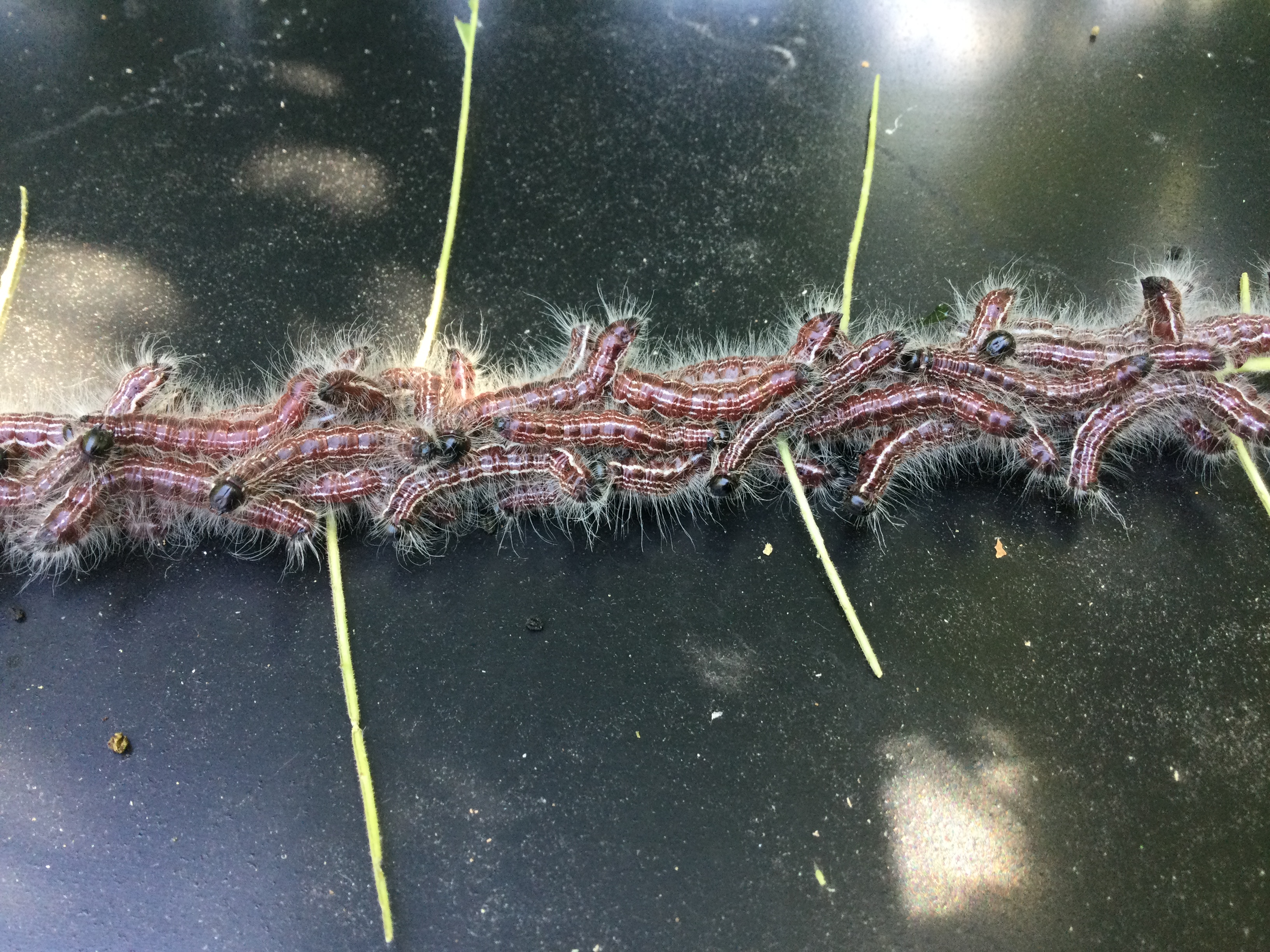
Walnut caterpillars

The walnut caterpillar (Datana integerrima) and fall webworm (Hyphantria cunea) are two of the most serious pests, they commonly eat the foliage in midsummer and continue into autumn.

Codling moth (Cydia pomonella) larvae eat walnut kernels, as well as apple and pear seeds.

Important leaf sucking insects include species of aphids and plant lice including (Monellia spp. and Monelliopsis spp.), which suck the juices from leaves and often deposit a sticky substance called "honey-dew" on the leaf surface that may turn black and prevent photosynthesis; and the walnut lace bug (Corythucha juglandis), which causes damage when the adults and nymphs suck the sap from the lower surfaces of walnut leaflets.

A disease complex known as thousand cankers disease has been threatening black walnut in several western states. This disease has recently been discovered in Tennessee, and could potentially have devastating effects on the species in the eastern United States. Vectored by the walnut twig beetle (Pityophthorus juglandis), a fungus, Geosmithia morbida, spreads into the wood around the galleries carved by the small beetles. The fungus causes cankers that inhibit the movement of nutrients in black walnut, leading to crown and branch dieback, and ultimately death.

=== Allelopathy ===
While black walnut is considered allelopathic, meaning it excretes chemicals into its environment that harm competition, research from 2019 has questioned whether this long-held belief holds up to scientifically rigorous examination. Many publications that have repeated claims of black walnut allelopathy cite a very limited set of dated research literature, which has not held up to scientific scrutiny. Anecdotally, records of walnut toxicity to other plants have been observed as far back as the first century when Pliny the Elder wrote: "The shadow of walnut trees is poison to all plants within its compass."

Like other walnuts, the roots, inner bark, nut husks, and leaves contain a nontoxic chemical called hydrojuglone; when exposed to air or soil compounds it is oxidized into juglone that is biologically active and acts as a respiratory inhibitor to some plants. Juglone is poorly soluble in water and does not move far in the soil and will stay most concentrated in the soil directly beneath the tree. Even after a tree is removed the soil where the roots once were will still contain juglone for several years after the tree is removed as more juglone will be released as the roots decay. Well drained and aerated soils will host a healthy community of soil microbes and these microbes will help to break down the juglone.

Symptoms of juglone poisoning include foliar yellowing and wilting. A number of plants are particularly sensitive. Apples, tomatoes, pines, and birch are poisoned by juglone, and as a precaution, should not be planted in proximity to a black walnut.

=== Interaction with horses ===
Horses are susceptible to laminitis from exposure to black walnut wood in bedding.

== Cultivation ==
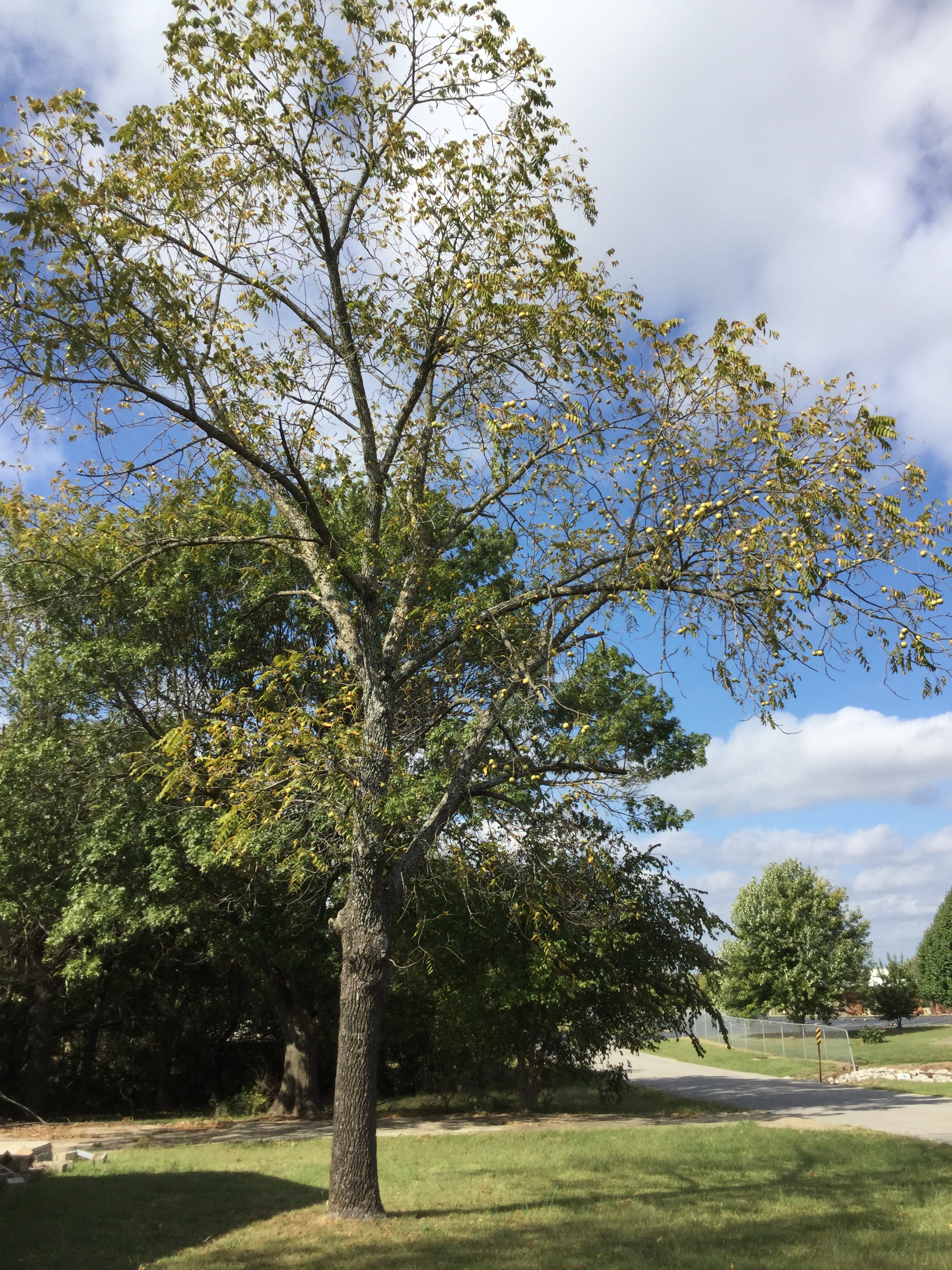
A young black walnut tree full of fruit in Eastern Oklahoma

The fruit production tends to occur irregularly with some years producing larger crops than others (see mast year). Fruiting may begin when the tree is 4–6 years old, but large crops take 20 years. Total lifespan of J. nigra is about 130 years. Like other trees of the order Fagales, such as oaks, hickories, chestnuts, and birches, it is monoecious, with wind-pollinated catkins. Male and female flowers are in separate spikes, and the female flowers typically appear before the male on a single tree (dichogamy). As a consequence, self-pollination is unlikely. However, individual trees are commonly self-compatible; if they are not pollinated by neighboring trees, they may set self-fertilized seeds. For maximum seed germination, the seeds should be cold-moist stratified for 3–4 months, although the exact time depends on the seed source. The seedlings emerge in April or May. While most trees with taproots have a reputation for slow growth, black walnut is an exception and can achieve very rapid growth in the seedling stage, typically 90 cm (35 in) their first year and even more in the second year. Black walnut will not leaf out until temperatures have warmed sufficiently. Leafout in spring is initiated when daytime highs reach approximately 70 °F (21 °C) and leaf drop in fall when daytime highs fall below 65 °F (18 °C). As such, the exact timing will vary in different regions of the U.S. and depending on the weather conditions from year to year, leafout is typically early April in the southern part of its range and sometimes not until the end of May or beginning of June in cooler areas. Leaf drop in fall may begin in late September in cooler regions and not until November in southern areas.

Black walnut is more resistant to frost than J. regia (the English or Persian walnut), but thrives best in the warmer regions of fertile, lowland soils with high water tables, although it will also grow in drier soils, but much more slowly. Some specimens have been found to survive frosts down to −45 °F (−43 °C). Some soils preferred by black walnut include alfisol and entisol soil types. Black walnut grows best on sandy loam, loam, or silt loam type soils but will also grow well on silty clay loam soils. It prefers these soils because they hold large quantities of water, which the tree draws from during rainless periods.

=== Planting ===
Black walnut has a strong taproot, which makes the seedlings resilient, but difficult to transplant.

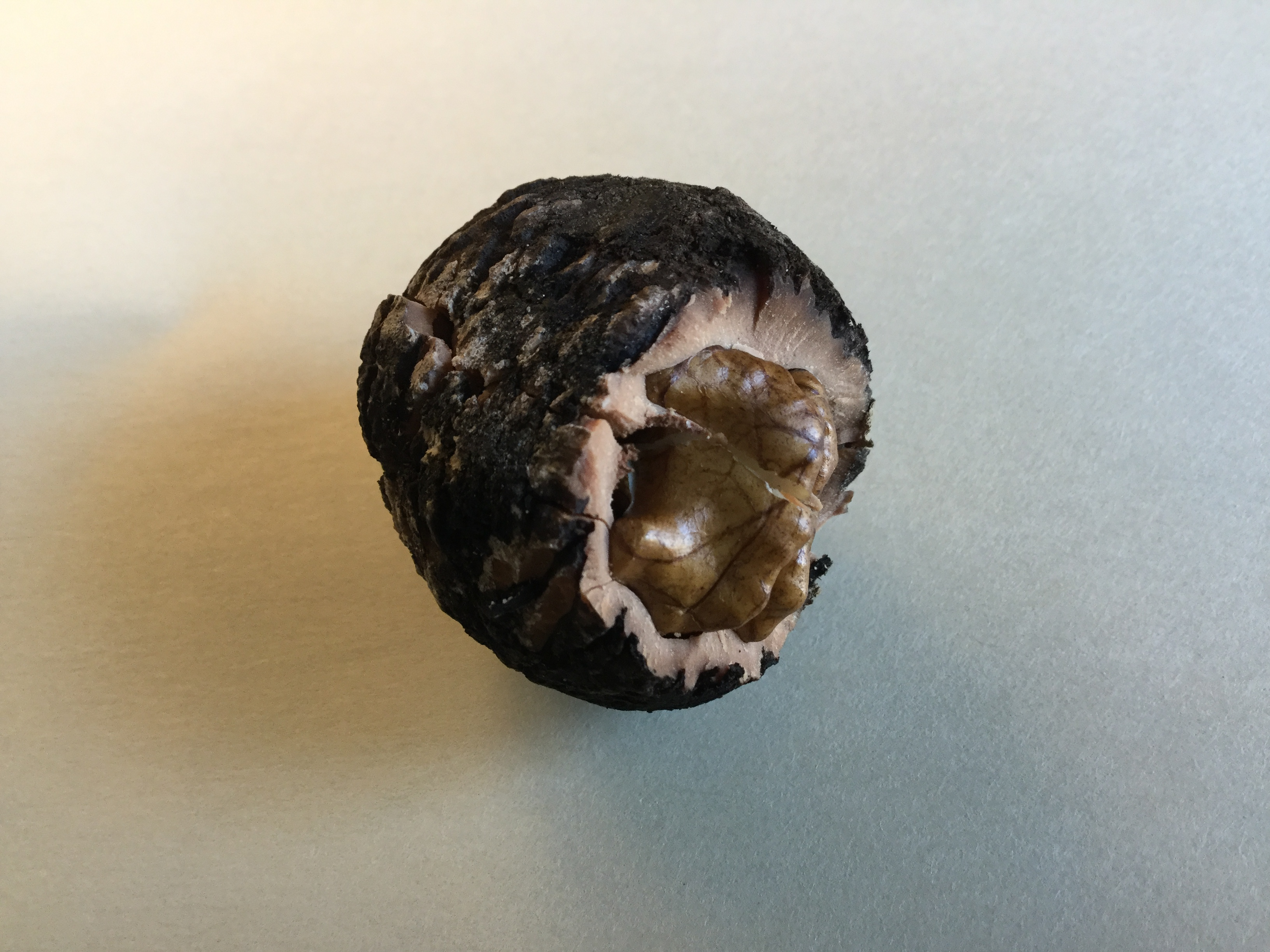
Seed shell cracked open to expose kernel. Under the right conditions, a black walnut tree will sprout and grow from a seed like the one pictured here.

While its primary native region is the Midwest and east-central United States, the black walnut was introduced into Europe, likely in the year 1629, where it has gained economic significance. It is also cultivated in Hawaii. It is cultivated as a forest tree for its high-quality wood. Black walnut plantings can be made to produce timber, nuts, or both timber and nuts. Patented timber-type trees were selected and released from Purdue University in the early 1990s. These trees have been sporadically available from nurseries. Varieties include Purdue #1, which can be used for both timber and nut production, though nut quality is poor compared to varieties selected specifically as nut producers.

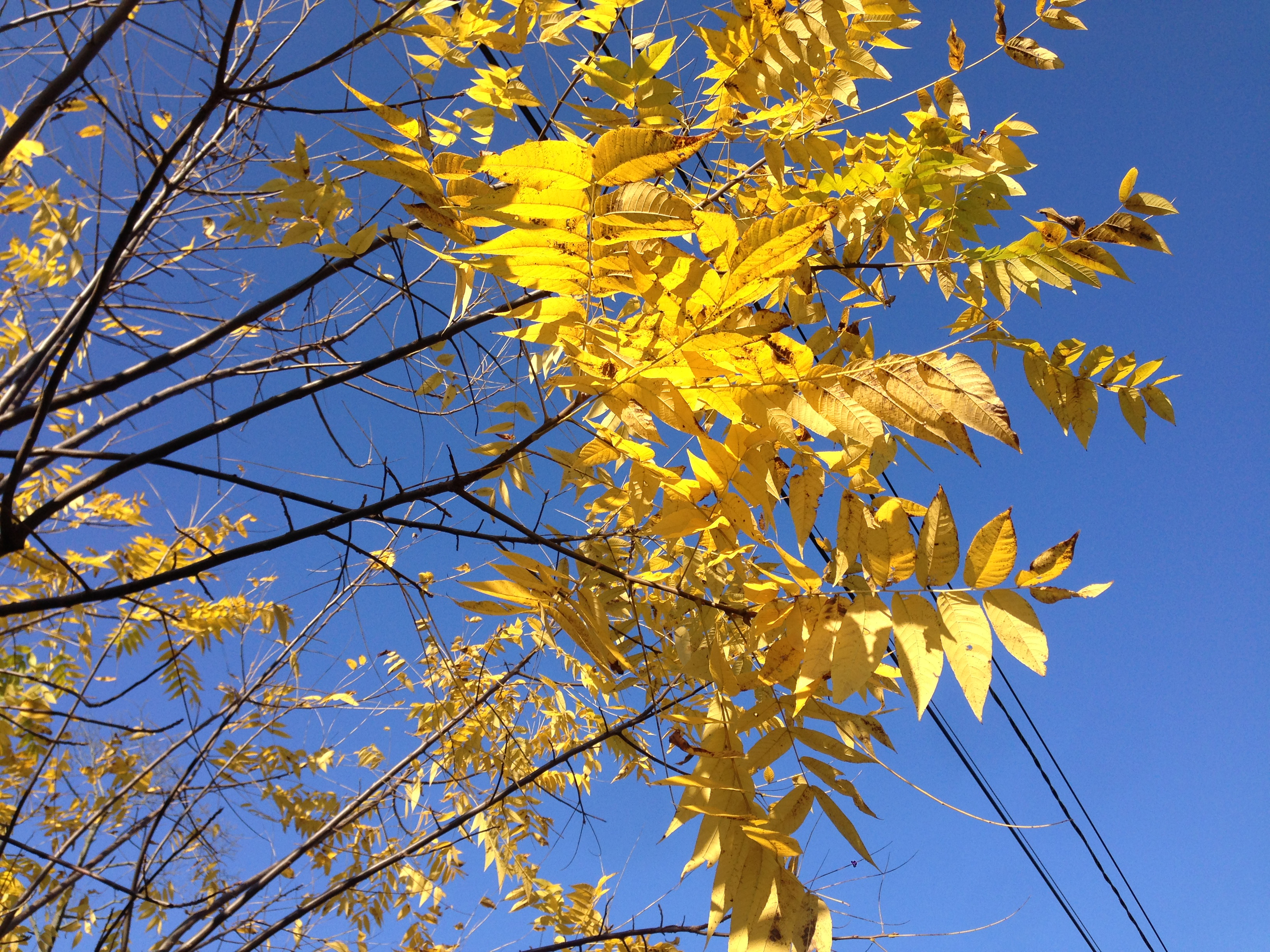
Autumn foliage

Grafted, nut-producing trees are available from several nurseries operating in the U.S. Selections worth considering include Thomas, Neel #1, Thomas Myers, Pounds #2, Stoker, Surprise, Emma K, Sparrow, S127, and McGinnis. Several older varieties, such as Kwik Krop, are still in cultivation; while they make decent nuts, they would not be recommended for commercial planting.

Pollination requirements should be considered when planting black walnuts. As is typical of many species in Juglandaceae, J. nigra trees tend to be monoecious, i.e.. produce pollen first and then pistillate flowers or else produce pistillate flowers and then pollen. An early pollen-producer should be grouped with other varieties that produce pistillate flowers so all varieties benefit from overlap. Cranz, Thomas, and Neel #1 make a good pollination trio. A similar group for more northern climates would be Sparrow, S127, and Mintle.

Sometimes black walnut is planted as part of reclaiming mines. When growing young trees weed control is critical for healthy establishment of the trees, without weed control the young trees are harmed significantly in their growth rate.

=== Commercial ===
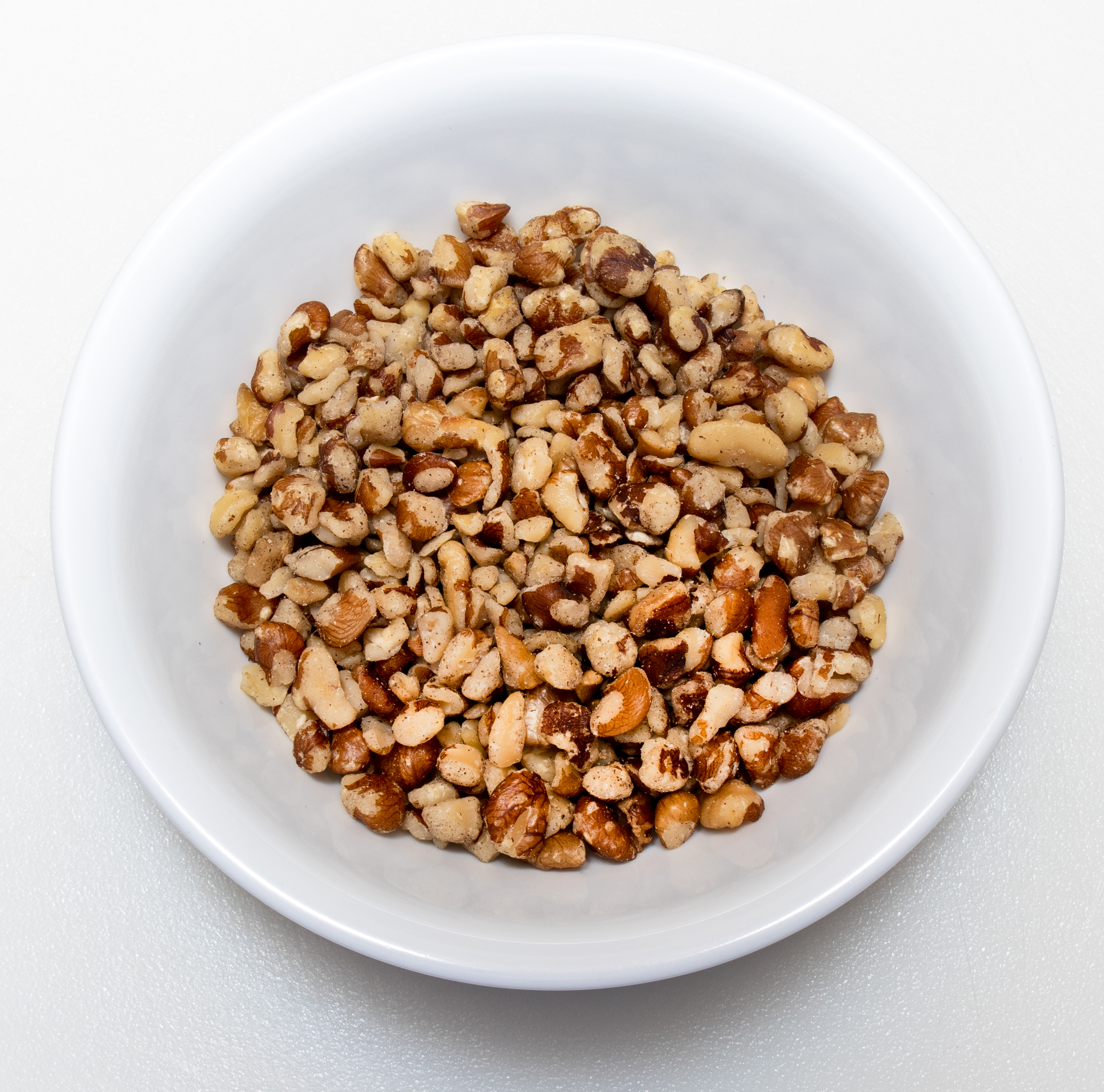
A bowl of black walnut kernels, shelled

Black walnuts are shelled commercially in the United States. With about 65% of the U.S.'s annual wild harvest, the U.S. state of Missouri is home to the world's largest processor and distributor of black walnuts, which the Missouri Department of Conservation considers to be the state's most valuable timber. In 1990, Missouri named the "Eastern Black Walnut" as its official tree nut. Missouri's largest processing plant is operated by Hammons Products in Stockton, Missouri. NPR affiliate KCUR stated in an article that "Ralph Hammons began the company in 1946 with a nut cracking machine acquired from Tennessee." The Stockton Black Walnut Festival, which has been held annually since 1961, "brings the community together for a 3-day event jam-packed with activities including a carnival, tractor pull, nut roll and 2-hour parade," stated Alexa Hodges in a VOX article.

==== Nut processing by hand ====
Hand stains after removing the husks from black walnuts

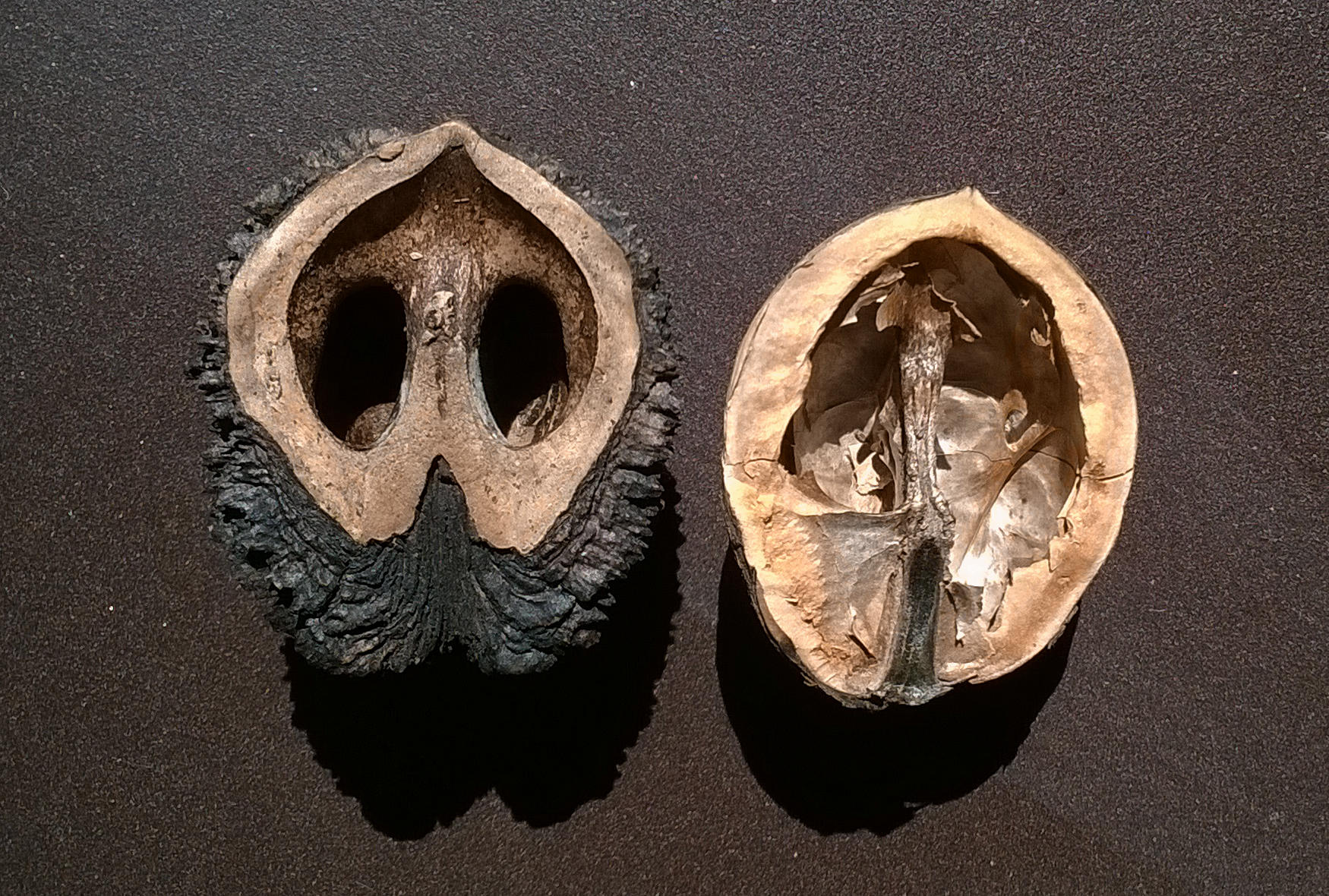
The black walnut (left) is harder to process than the English walnut (right)

The extraction of the kernel from the fruit of the black walnut is difficult. The thick, hard shell is tightly bound by tall ridges to a thick husk. Rolling the nut underfoot on a hard surface such as a driveway is a common method; commercial huskers use a car tire rotating against a metal mesh. Some take a thick plywood board and drill a nut-sized hole in it (from one to two inches in diameter) and smash the nut through using a hammer. The nut goes through and the husk remains behind. American pioneers let the nuts dry in the sun, then removed the husks and let the kernels dry—making them less bitter.

The shell itself is thicker than that of the English walnut, and there are additional, thick internal walls tightly surrounding the nutmeat. Walnuts are too tough and too large to be opened with a standard nutcracker, but simply cracking the shell open with a rock results in smashed and shattered nutmeats mixed with shell, unless done with some care and skill—and it is still nearly impossible to extract an intact half this way. As a result, a number of home walnut-cracking devices have been produced, involving vices, cams, or levers.

While the flavor of the Juglans nigra kernel is prized, the difficulty in preparing it may account for the wider popularity and availability of the English walnut.

=== Ornamental ===
J. nigra is also grown as a specimen ornamental tree in parks and large gardens, growing to 30 m (100 ft) tall by 20 m (65 ft) broad. It has gained the Royal Horticultural Society's Award of Garden Merit.

== Uses ==
Walnut, black (J. nigra)
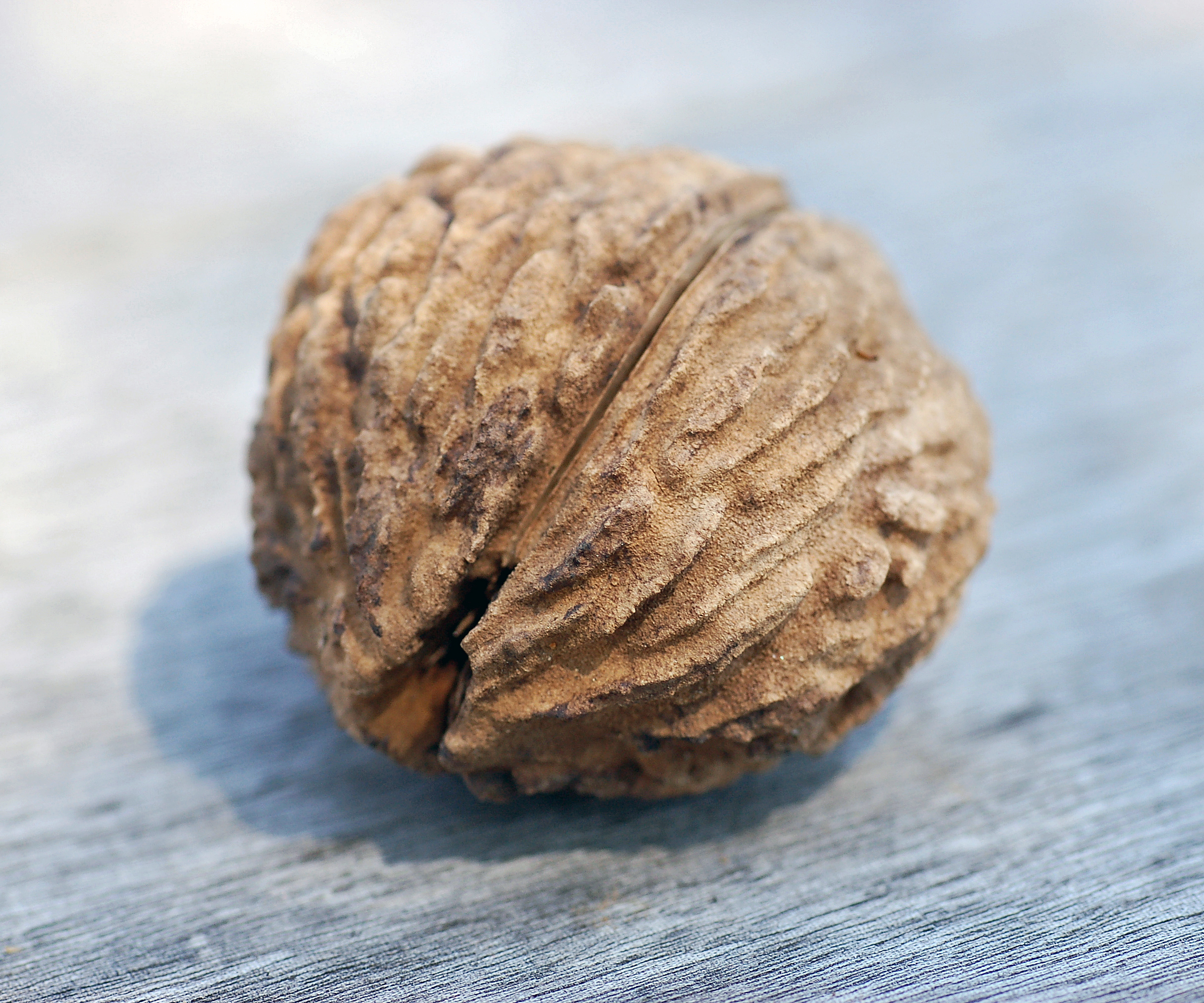
- Black walnut

Nutritional value per 100 grams
- Energy: 619 kcal (2,590 kJ)
- Carbohydrates: 9.6 g
- Starch: 0.24 g
- Sugars: 1.10 g
- Dietary fiber: 6.8 g
- Fat: 59.3 g
- Saturated: 3.5 g
- Monounsaturated: 15.4 g
- Polyunsaturated omega−3 omega−6: 36.4 g 2.7 g 33.8 g
- Protein: 24.06 g
Vitamins and minerals
Vitamins	Quantity %DV^{†}
Vitamin A	40 IU
Thiamine (B1)	5% 0.057 mg
Riboflavin (B2)	10% 0.130 mg
Niacin (B3)	3% 0.470 mg
Pantothenic acid (B5)	33% 1.660 mg
Vitamin B6	34% 0.583 mg
Folate (B9)	8% 31 μg
Vitamin C	2% 1.7 mg
Vitamin E	14% 2.1 mg
Vitamin K	2% 2.7 μg
Minerals	Quantity %DV^{†}
Calcium	5% 61 mg
Copper	156% 1.4 mg
Iron	17% 3.12 mg
Magnesium	48% 201 mg
Manganese	169% 3.896 mg
Phosphorus	41% 513 mg
Potassium	17% 523 mg
Selenium	31% 17 μg
Sodium	0% 2 mg
Zinc	31% 3.37 mg
- Other constituents: Quantity
- Water: 4.56 g
- Link to USDA Database entry
- ^{†}Percentages estimated using US recommendations for adults, except for potassium, which is estimated based on expert recommendation from the National Academies.

=== As food ===
Black walnut kernels are edible. The nut provides a robust, distinctive, natural flavor and crunch as a food ingredient. Common uses include ice cream, bakery goods and confections. Consumers include black walnuts in traditional treats, such as cakes, cookies, fudge, and pies, during the fall holiday season. The nuts are versatile for uses in other foods, such as salads, fish, pork, chicken, vegetables and pasta dishes.

Tapped in spring, the tree yields a sweet sap that can be drunk or concentrated into syrup or sugar not unlike that of sugar maple.

==== Nutrition ====
Black walnut kernels are 5% water, 59% fat, 24% protein, and 10% carbohydrates. In a reference amount of 100 g (3.5 oz), walnuts supply 619 calories and several micronutrients in rich amounts at 20% or more of the Daily Value (DV), including the dietary minerals manganese (169% DV) and copper (156% DV), among others, and the B vitamins, B_{6} (34% DV) and pantothenic acid (33% DV). Black walnut kernels are a moderate source (10–19% DV) of vitamin E and riboflavin.

Analysis of black walnut fat content showed the most prevalent fatty acids are linoleic acid (33.8%), followed by oleic acid (15.3%), alpha-linolenic acid (2.7%), palmitic acid (1.9%), and stearic acid (1.5%).

=== Dye ===
Black walnut drupes contain juglone (5-hydroxy-1,4-naphthoquinone), plumbagin (yellow quinone pigments), and tannin. These compounds cause walnuts to stain cars, sidewalks, porches, and patios, in addition to the hands of anyone attempting to shell them. The brownish-black dye was used by early American settlers to dye hair. According to Eastern Trees in the Petersen Guide series, black walnuts make a yellowish-brown dye, not brownish-black. The apparent confusion is easily explained by the fact that the liquid (dye) obtained from the inner husk becomes increasingly darker over time, as the outer skin darkens from light green to black. Extracts of the outer, soft part of the drupe are still used as a natural dye for handicrafts. The tannins present in walnuts act as a mordant, aiding in the dyeing process, and are usable as a dark ink or wood stain.

=== Shells ===
Walnut shells are often used as an abrasive in sand blasting or other circumstances where a medium hardness grit is required. The hard black walnut shell is also used commercially in abrasive cleaning, a filtering agent in scrubbers in smoke stacks, cleaning jet engines, cosmetics, and oil well drilling and water filtration. Additionally, the husks are ground into an ingredient in exfoliating cosmetics.

=== Wood ===
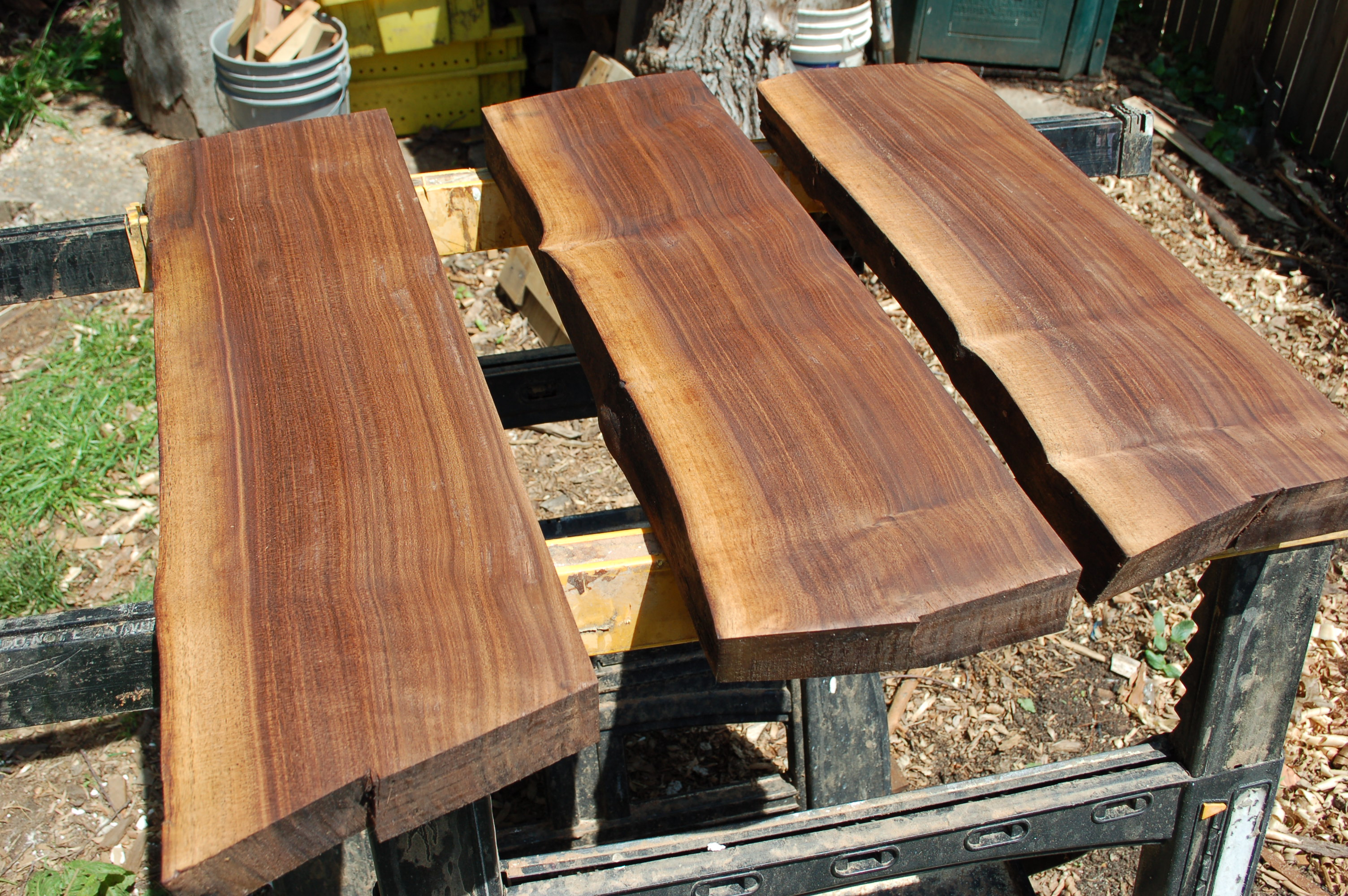
Black walnut wood showing the color and grain

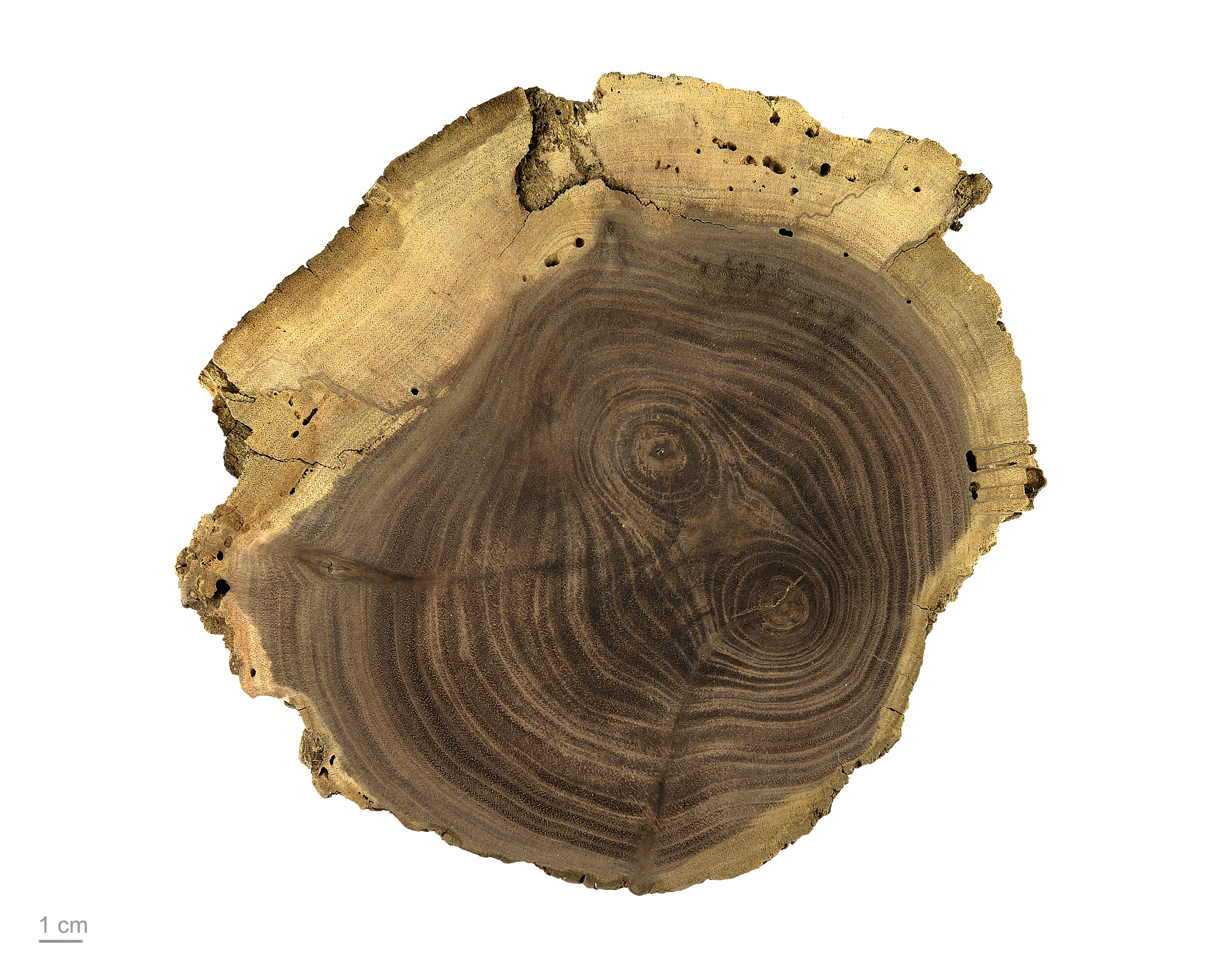
Wood in cross section

Black walnut is highly prized for its dark-colored, straight grained, true heartwood. It is heavy, strong, shock resistant and yet can be easily split and worked. Along with cedars (Thuja spp.), chestnut (Castanea spp.), and black locust (Robinia pseudoacacia) black walnut is one of the most durable hardwoods in the US. The wood can be kiln dried and holds its shape well after seasoning, which makes this wood even more attractive for wood working.

Walnut wood has historically been used for gun stocks, furniture, flooring, paddles, coffins, and a variety of other wood products. Black walnut has a density of 660 kg per cubic meter (41.2 lb/cubic foot), which makes it less dense than oak.

== Largest trees ==
The U.S. national champion black walnut, also known locally as the Sauvie Island Tree, was situated on a residential property on Sauvie Island, Oregon. It was 8 ft 7 in (2.62 m) diameter at breast height and 112 ft (34 m) tall, with a crown spread of 144 feet (44 m).

In the mid-2010s, it was clear that the tree was in visible decline. In 2019, it was confirmed that the tree was succumbing to Thousand Cankers Disease, and plans were set in place to fell the tree to mitigate the risk of disease being spread.

In August 2020, workers brought down the tree with the use of specialised equipment.

Slabs cut from the tree have been salvaged for reuse, as the timber is highly regarded in the woodworking industry.

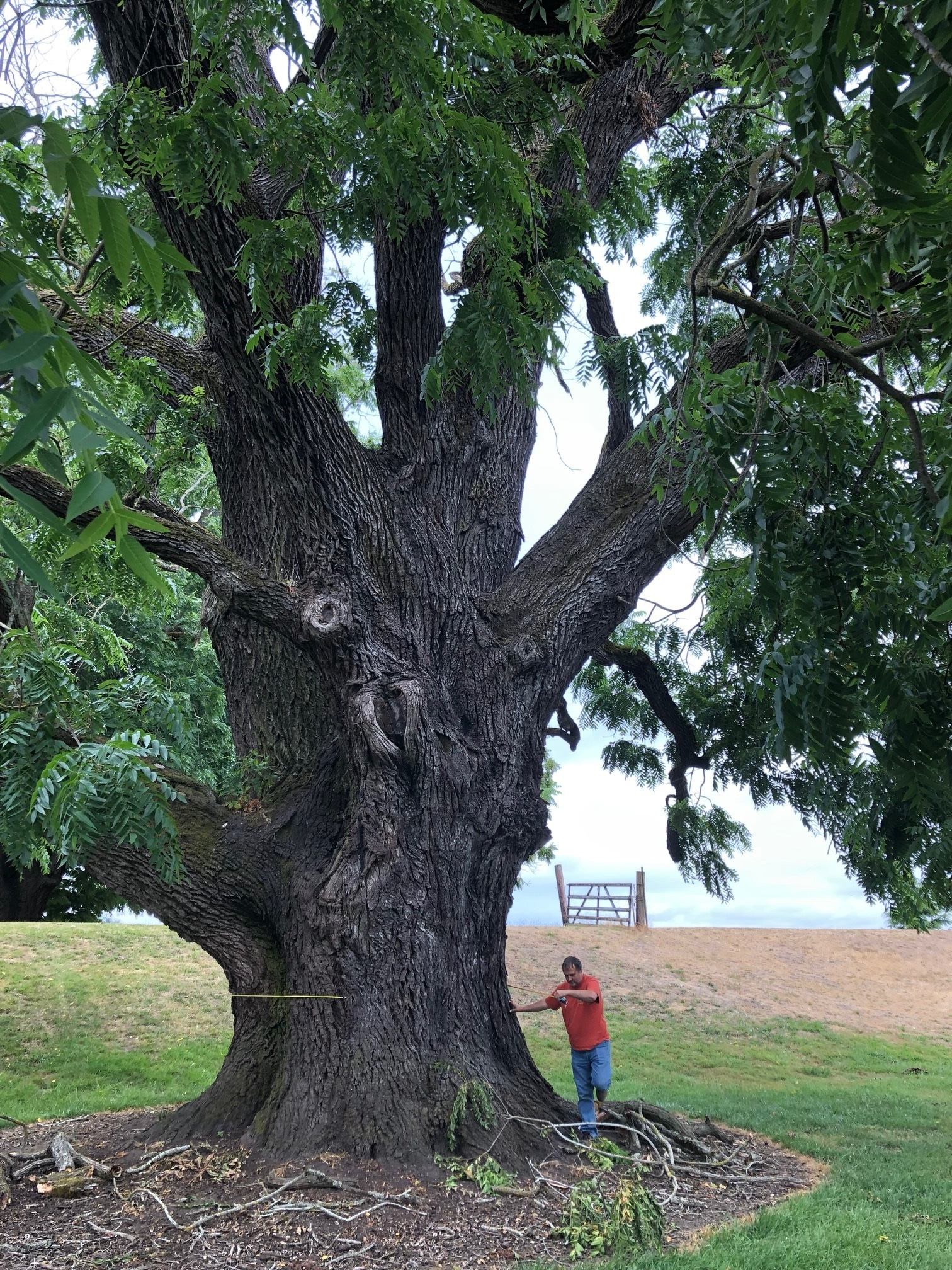
Sauvie Island Tree, once the largest known black walnut tree in North America on Sauvie Island, Oregon, before it was felled in August 2020 due to Thousand Cankers Disease.

The tallest black walnut in Europe is located in the Woluwe Park in the city of Sint-Pieters-Woluwe, Brussels, Belgium. It has a circumference of 3.50 m (11 ft 6 in), height of exactly 33.60 m (110.2 ft) (measured by laser), and was planted around 1850 (± 10 years).

The largest black walnut in Europe is located in the Castle Park in the city of Sereď, Slovakia. It has a circumference of 6.30 m (20 ft 8 in), height of 25 m (82 ft) and estimated age of 300 years.

== See also ==
- Taxonomy of walnut tree varieties
- Anthelmintic
