= Pseudopityophthorus pubipennis =

Scientific classification
- Domain: Eukaryota
- Kingdom: Animalia
- Phylum: Arthropoda
- Class: Insecta
- Order: Coleoptera
- Suborder: Polyphaga
- Infraorder: Cucujiformia
- Family: Curculionidae
- Genus: Pseudopityophthorus
- Species: P. pubipennis

Binomial name
- Pseudopityophthorus pubipennis (LeConte, 1860)

Species of beetle

Pseudopityophthorus pubipennis, the western oak bark beetle, is a species of typical bark beetle in the family Curculionidae. It is found in North America.
