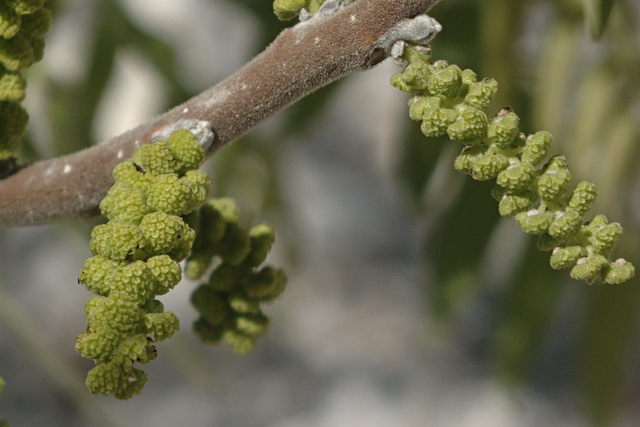
- Buds

Conservation status
- Least Concern (IUCN 3.1)

Scientific classification
- Kingdom: Plantae
- Clade: Tracheophytes
- Clade: Angiosperms
- Clade: Eudicots
- Clade: Rosids
- Order: Fagales
- Family: Juglandaceae
- Genus: Juglans
- Section: Juglans sect. Rhysocaryon
- Species: J. microcarpa

Binomial name
- Juglans microcarpa Berlandier
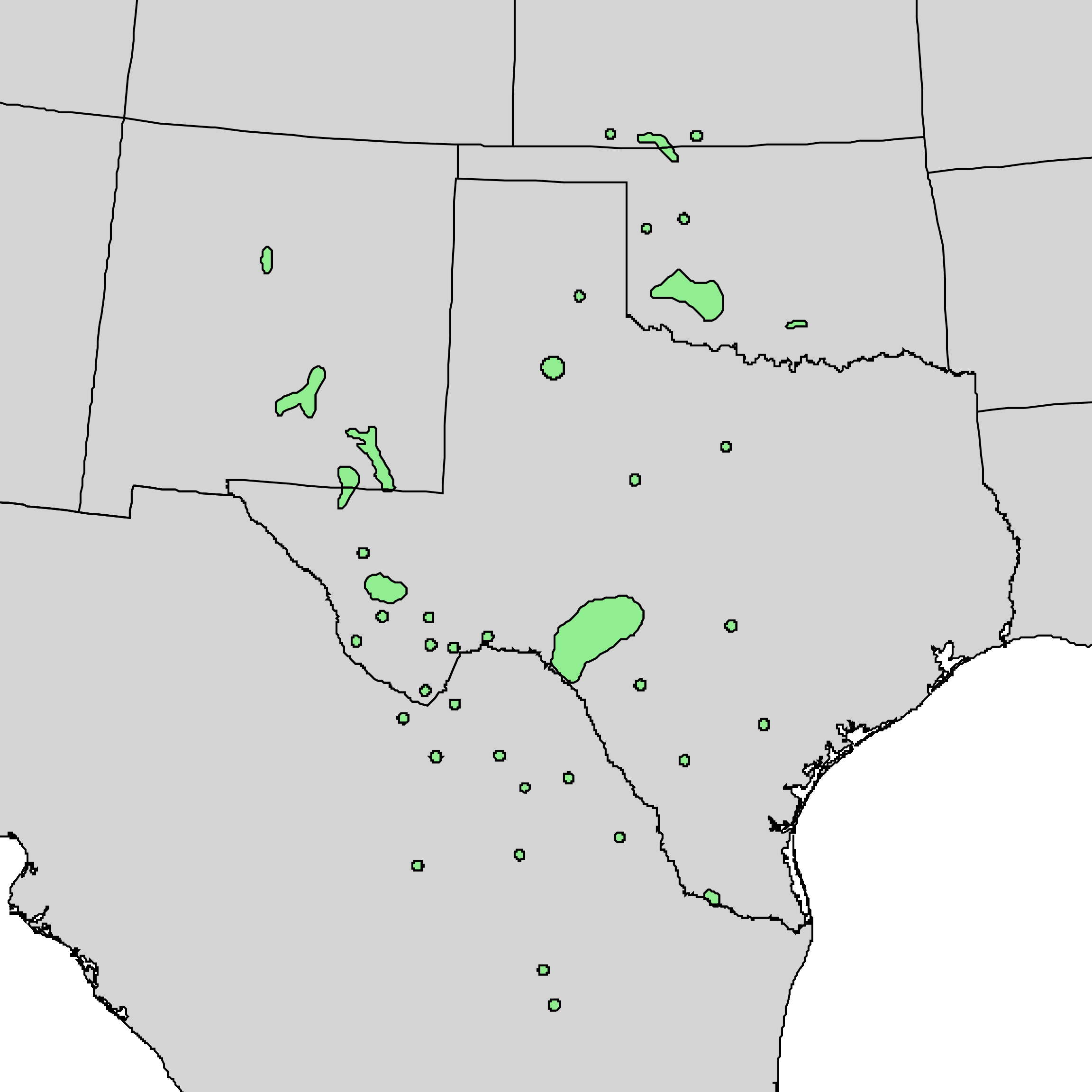
- Natural range of Juglans microcarpa

= Juglans microcarpa =

Species of tree

Juglans microcarpa, known also as the little walnut, Texas walnut, Texas black walnut or little black walnut (as it belongs to the "black walnuts" section Juglans sect. Rhysocaryon), is a large shrub or small tree (10–30 ft tall) which grows wild along streams and ravines in Texas, New Mexico, Oklahoma, and Kansas, and the northernmost states of Mexico. It produces nuts with a width of 1/2—3/4 in. The pinnately compound leaves bear 7—25 untoothed to finely-toothed leaflets, each 1/4—1/2 in wide. It is found at elevations ranging from 700 ft to 6700 ft.

Two varieties are recognized: J. microcarpa var. microcarpa and J. microcarpa var. stewartii.

Where the range of J. microcarpa overlaps with J. major, the two species interbreed, producing populations with intermediate characteristics. This phenomenon has also been found where J. microcarpa trees grows near J. nigra trees.

Juglans (literally "Jupiter's acorn") is the Latin name of the walnut. Microcarpa means "having small fruit". Though very small, the seeds contained within the nuts are edible.

== References and external links ==
- Media related to Juglans microcarpa at Wikimedia Commons
