= Thousand cankers disease =

Disease of walnut trees

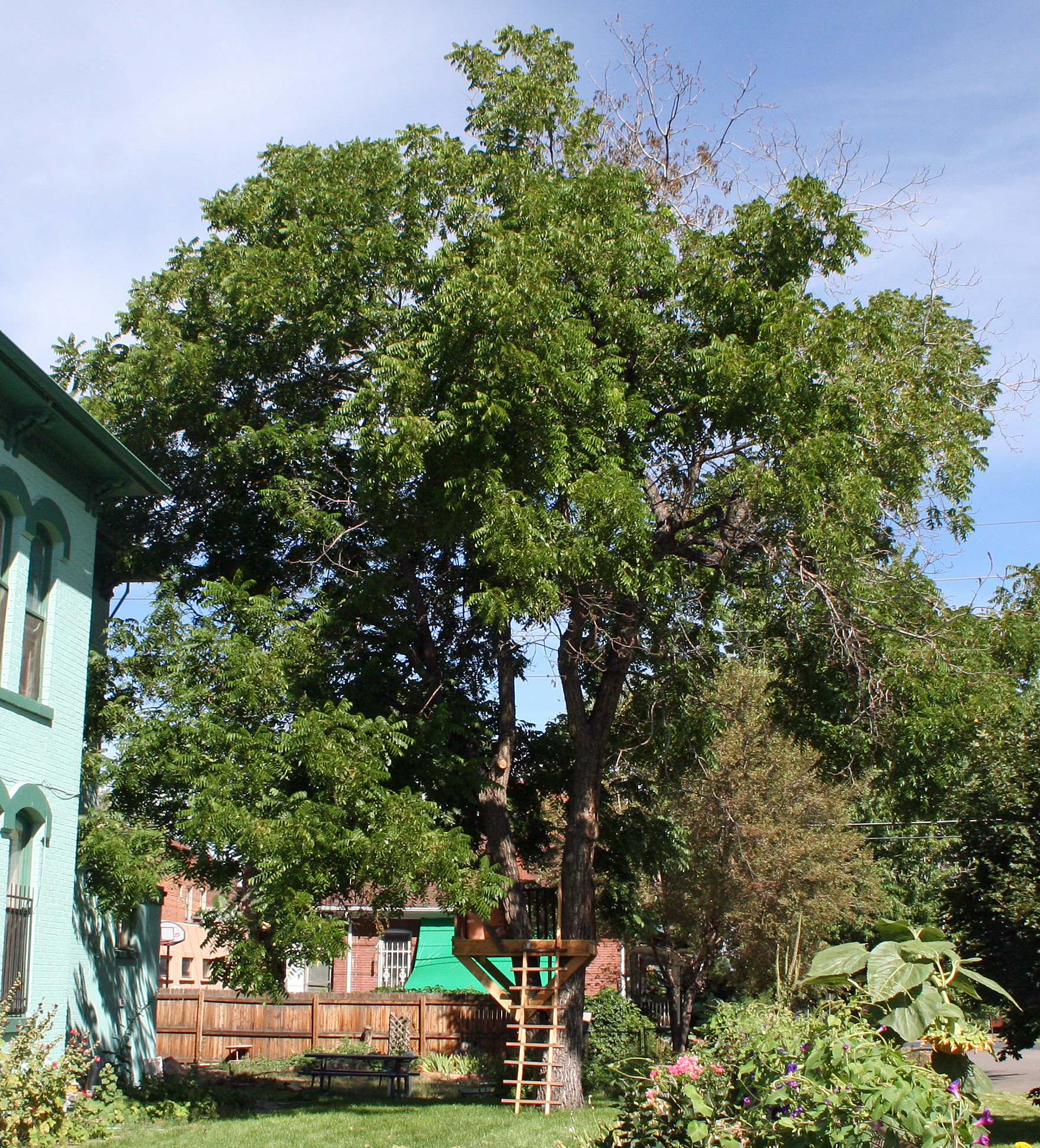
- A walnut tree in Denver, Colorado affected by Thousand cankers disease.
- Common names: TCD
- Causal agents: Geosmithia morbida
- Hosts: Walnut trees (Juglans sp.)
- Vectors: walnut twig beetle (Pityophthorus juglandis)
- EPPO Code: GEOHMO

Thousand cankers disease (TCD) is a recently recognized disease of certain walnuts (Juglans spp.). The disease results from the combined activity of the walnut twig beetle (Pityophthorus juglandis) and a canker producing fungus, Geosmithia morbida. Until July 2010 the disease was only known to the western United States where over the past decade it has been involved in several large scale die-offs of walnut, particularly black walnut, Juglans nigra. However, in late July 2010 a well-established outbreak of the disease was found in the Knoxville, Tennessee, area. This new finding is the first locating it within the native range of its susceptible host, black walnut. In 2013, an outbreak was found in the Veneto region of Italy, where the disease has been found on both black walnut and English walnut.

== Description ==
Adult walnut twig beetles carry spores of the Geosmithia morbida fungus, which grows profusely around the pupal chamber of the beetles. Following emergence from trees the beetles subsequently tunnel into branches and trunks of walnut for production of egg galleries or overwintering shelters. The fungus is introduced into the tree during this wounding where it subsequently germinates and grows.

The fungal mycelium initially colonize tissue immediately surrounding the beetle galleries. However, in less than a month black, oval-shaped, inky cankers extend considerably beyond the galleries and may reach more than 3 cm in length in susceptible hosts (e.g., black walnut). In the beginning these cankers develop in phloem and tissues formed by the cork cambium. The affected area is very shallow and never show the "open-faced", perennial, target-shape typical of many canker diseases of trees (e.g., Nectria canker). Instead, in TCD the bark remains firmly attached to the canker face making the necrotic areas very difficult to observe. Branch cankers usually are not visible until the outer bark is shaved to expose the beetle tunnels, although during late stages of the disease a dark amber stain may form on the bark surface in association with the cankers.

Each time a beetle tunnels into a tree a canker is initiated. Cankers also may continue to expand and penetrate into the cambium of the tree. Each such injury destroys the phloem and robs the tree of its ability to store and move nutrients. As TCD progresses cankers coalesce to further girdle branches greatly restricting nutrient movement. As the tree declines, more bark beetles are attracted and more cankers are formed. Eventually the enormous number of beetle attacks and subsequent canker formation overwhelms and kills the tree. Thousand cankers is a progressive disease and its effects result from the culmination of a large number of relatively small cankers over a period of time.

In end stages of the disease external symptoms become visible. Leaf yellowing on the exterior of the crown is often the first symptom and may originally be restricted to a single branch. However, as the cumulative effects of the girdling progress increasingly large areas of the tree are affected. Sudden leaf wilting, ultimately involving large limbs, characterizes end stage thousand cankers disease. In susceptible hosts, trees are almost always killed within 2–3 years after external symptoms of leaf yellowing are first observed.

The progress of thousand cankers will vary due to several factors, notably the susceptibility of the host. There appears to be a considerable range of TCD susceptibility among various Juglans species with Juglans nigra (black walnut) being particularly susceptible. Conversely, Arizona walnut (Juglans major) appears to be quite resistant to the disease, with bark beetle attacks largely limited to small diameter branches, the fungus growing to a very limited extent, and effects of the disease rarely, if ever, progressing to involve large areas of the tree. Similarly southern California walnut (Juglans californica) and little walnut (Juglans microcarpa) may show fairly high resistance. Northern California walnut (Juglans hindsii) and the commercial nut-producing Persian (English) walnut (Juglans regia) apparently show various degrees of intermediate TCD susceptibility.

== History ==
Thousand cankers is a recently described disease and its involvement in tree mortality apparently is also recent. The first published note involving black walnut die-offs that likely can be attributed to TCD occurred in the Espanola Valley of northern New Mexico in 2001. Walnut twig beetles were associated with this unusual cluster of walnut mortality, but drought was originally thought to be the cause. A parallel situation occurred in eastern Colorado during the early 2000s where unexplained black walnut deaths were observed in several sites (Colorado Springs, Boulder, Westminster) and originally thought to be associated with drought. Walnut twig beetles were subsequently recovered in 2004, which constituted a new state record for the species.

This appears to have been preceded by unusual black walnut mortality during the mid-1990s of undetermined cause that were noted in the vicinity of Logan, Utah. Collections of walnut twig beetles were made in 1996 in association with this outbreak. A 1988 collection of walnut twig beetle from the Provo area, collected incidentally when sweeping vegetation, appears to be a precedent first collection of this species in the state.

New state records of walnut twig beetle have occurred in several other western states within the past 12 years including Oregon (1997), Idaho (2003) and Washington (2008). Most collections from these states were associated with walnut die-offs, although the beetle has also been incidentally collected in Lindgren funnel traps used for survey of other forest pests. Walnut twig beetle records in California date to 1959, when it was found in Los Angeles County; known range extensions for this species within the state have increased widely in recent years and it is now known to be widely distributed within the state.

Although walnut twig beetles were repeatedly and regularly noted in association with unexplained walnut deaths since 2002 it was recognized that their activity alone appeared insufficient to produce all the effects that produce thousand cankers disease. It required discovery of the previously undescribed Geosmithia fungus - and an appreciation of its role in canker production - to complete an understanding of how the disease can develop.

The initial description of the thousand cankers disease was constructed in early 2008 by researchers at Colorado State University and subsequently information was extended to alert researchers, arborists and others with interest in tree health care. This led to numerous new TCD records in the western US during 2008 and 2009. Initial description of thousand cankers disease in a refereed journal occurred in August 2009. Symposia dedicated to this new disease have been held at the Annual Meeting of the Entomological Society of America in December 2008 and at a Missouri Department of Agriculture sponsored meeting in St. Louis during November 3–4, 2009.

== Management ==
Thousand cankers disease can be spread by moving infected black walnut wood. Trees intended for shipment should be inspected for dieback and cankers and galleries after harvest. G. morbida or the walnut twig beetle (Pityophthorus juglandis) are not currently known to be moved with walnut seed. There is currently no chemical therapy or prevention available for the disease making it difficult to control the spread of the disease from the west to the eastern United States. Wood from infected trees can still be used for commercial value, but safety measures such as removing the bark, phloem, and cambium should be followed to reduce the risk of spreading the disease with shipment. Quarantines have been put in place in some states to reduce the potential movement of fungus or beetle from that region. On May 17, 2010, the Director of the Michigan Department of Agriculture issued a quarantine from affected states to protect Michigan’s black walnut ecology and production. Contacting the appropriate entities about possible infections is important to stopping or slowing the spread of thousand cankers disease.

== Pathogenesis ==
The genus Geosmithia (Ascomycota: Hypocreales) are generally saprophytic fungi affecting hardwoods. As of its identification in 2010, the species G. morbida is the first documented as a plant pathogen. The walnut twig beetle (Pityophthorus juglandis) carries the mycelium and conidia of the fungus as it burrows into the tree. The beetle is currently only found in warmer climates, allowing for transmission of the fungus throughout the year. Generations of the beetle move to and from black walnut trees carrying the fungus as they create galleries, the adults typically moving horizontally, and the larvae moving vertically with the grain. As they move through the wood, the beetles deposit the fungus, which is then introduced into the phloem; cankers then develop around the galleries, quickly girdling the tree. The fungus has not been found to provide any value to the beetle. A study done by Montecchio and Faccoli in Italy in 2014 found that no fungal fruiting bodies were found around or on the cankers but in the galleries. Mycelium, and sometimes conidiophores and conidia were observed in the galleries as well. No sexual stage of the fungus has currently been found.

== Importance ==
Black walnut wood is valued for its use in cabinetry, furniture making, and other woodworking. In 2008, 700 trees in boulder Colorado were removed from what was thought to be a decline disease, but later discovered as Thousand Cankers Disease. In 2009, the Missouri Department of Conservation issued a prediction of losses for the state due to the disease. They predicted the annual wood product loss after established infection would have a total value of $36,333,677, with a loss of 210 jobs. It was also predicted that the annual nut production loss would total $35,291,500, with 504 jobs lost in the industry and sector.

Although the integrity of the wood is not compromised, the rapid tree death greatly reduces the supply of black walnut wood. The seed from black walnut is also valued for its ecological importance. G. morbida does not affect the seeds, but increased tree death would lead to decreased nut production, hindering both human industry, and creating a lost food source for wildlife. With widespread loss of walnut trees spreading from the western united states, to Tennessee, there is increasing importance to protect walnuts in the eastern United States, or risk losing much of the walnut production in the United States.

== Origin ==
The origin of thousand cankers disease remains a subject of some uncertainty and its resolution will require further studies likely based on genetic analyses. One proposal suggests that the disease is resulted from a host transfer of the walnut twig beetle and its Geosmithia associate from native, resistant Juglans (Arizona walnut and possibly southern California walnut) into susceptible species of walnut.

Several data seem to support this hypothesis. The walnut twig beetle is a normal associate of Arizona walnut and was first described in 1929 from a collection near Silver City (Lone Mountain) in Grant County, New Mexico. Subsequent reviews of North American bark beetles through 1992 only note walnut twig beetles from areas within the range of Arizona walnut, excepting the two 1959 captures in Los Angeles County, where southern California walnut is native.

Recent observations of walnut twig beetle activity in Arizona walnut trees indicate that the beetle in this host functions as a "typical" twig beetle of the genus Pityophthorus, restricting breeding to overshaded or damaged branches and twigs. The appearance of extensive colonization of trees by walnut twig beetle have only been observed in black walnut, a species native to the eastern half of the US but planted widely in the western states over the past century.

The Geosmithia fungus, although recently described, is consistently found where ever walnut twig beetles are recovered, including those associated with Arizona walnut. In Arizona walnut, laboratory inoculations indicate that it grows slowly, particularly compared to black walnut, and thousand cankers disease has not been observed to develop in native stands of this species that grow in Arizona and New Mexico. Optimum temperatures for development of the Geosmithia fungus are high, also suggesting a warm climate origin, a feature that is consistent with the native distribution of Arizona walnut.

Genetic analysis of Geosmithia isolates from throughout the western United States is currently considered a high research priority. Preliminary observations indicate that there is considerable variability, indicating no genetic bottlenecks that might be expected from point introductions. Furthermore, genetically related strains may be found over wide geographic areas (e.g., California and Colorado).

Alternatively it is suggested that thousand cankers may have developed from a recent introduction of the Geosmithia fungus or some change in its pathogenicity.

Regardless there has been a broad range extension of the walnut twig beetle within the past 15 years so that it currently is known from all western states for which it has been surveyed (AZ, CA, CO, ID, OR, UT, WA). Whether this has occurred through natural dispersal events or by human transport of twig beetle infested walnut products (e.g., firewood, fresh cut logs, wood pieces used by woodworkers) is not known.

The most recent finding of the beetle, in the Knoxville, Tennessee area, clearly is the result of human transport of walnut twig beetle-containing walnut wood, the original event probably occurring a decade or more ago. Walnut wood is extremely infectious (i.e., contains fungus bearing bark beetles) for at least 2–3 years after trees are cut. The beetles are capable of surviving on small pieces of wood, as long as some bark is attached, and some beetles can even survive normal wood chipping.

New infestations from thousand cankers can become established with the movement of a single piece of wood. As the disease develops slowly, and external symptoms may not become visible for 10–20 years after the original establishment, it is possible that additional, undetected infestations are present in the eastern US.
