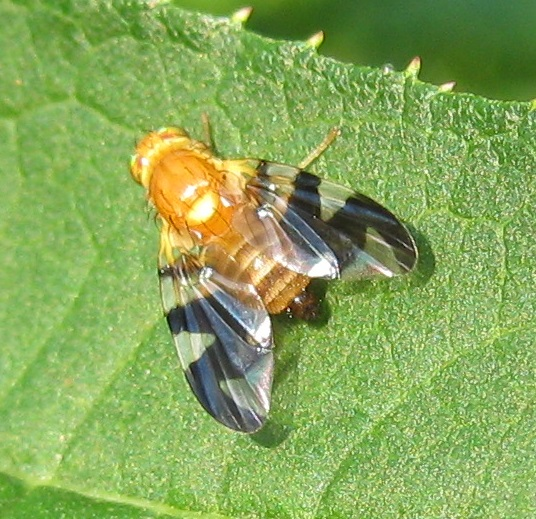

Scientific classification
- Kingdom: Animalia
- Phylum: Arthropoda
- Class: Insecta
- Order: Diptera
- Family: Tephritidae
- Genus: Rhagoletis
- Species: R. suavis

Binomial name
- Rhagoletis suavis (Loew, 1862)

= Rhagoletis suavis =

Species of fly

Rhagoletis suavis, also known as the walnut husk maggot, is a species of tephritid or fruit fly in the family Tephritidae. This fly is closely related to, but not to be confused with, Rhagoletis juglandis, or the walnut husk fly. It occurs in North America.
