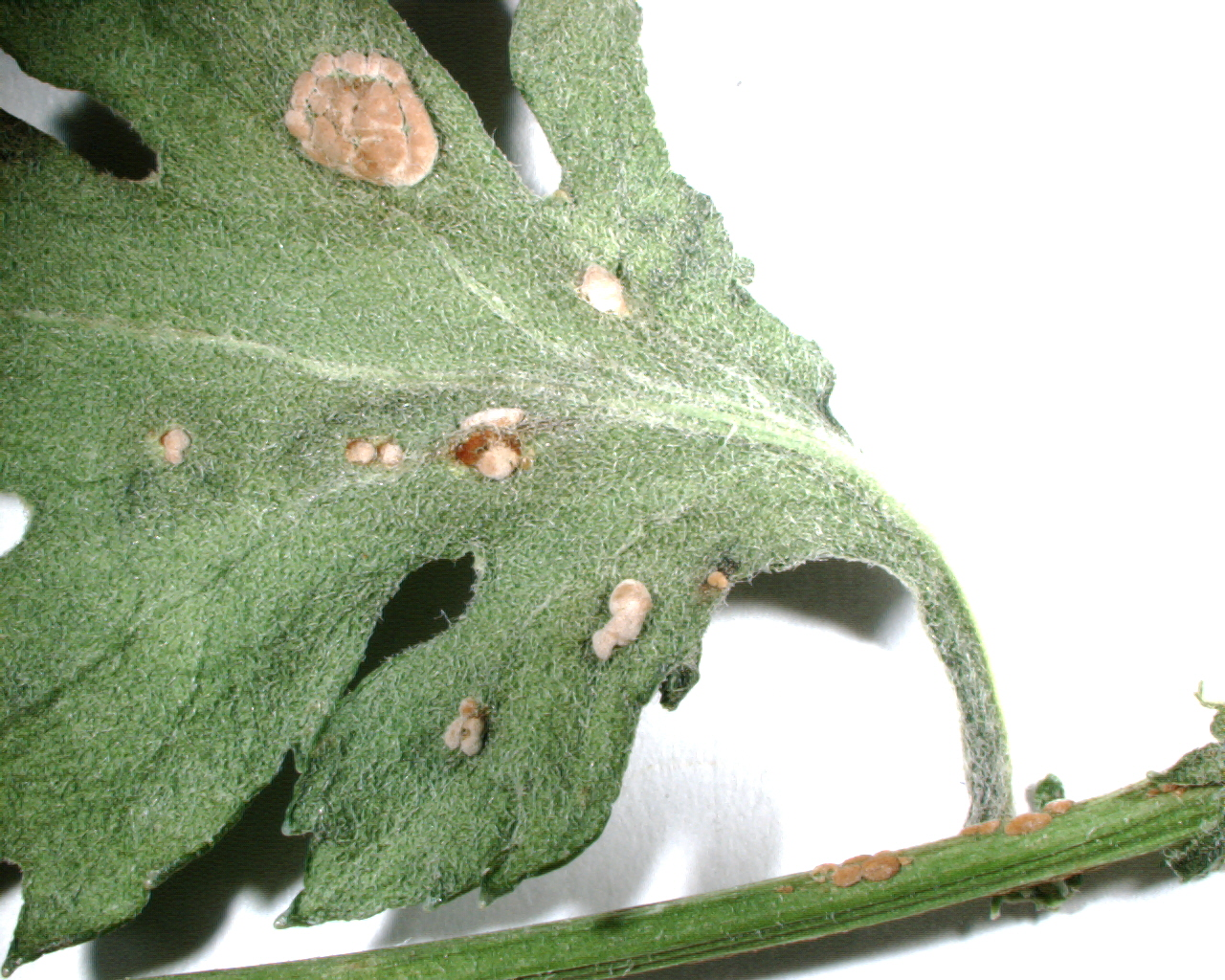
- Pustules caused by chrysanthemum white rust

Scientific classification
- Kingdom: Fungi
- Division: Basidiomycota
- Class: Pucciniomycetes
- Order: Pucciniales
- Family: Pucciniaceae
- Genus: Puccinia
- Species: P. horiana

Binomial name
- Puccinia horiana Henn. 1901

= Puccinia horiana =

Chrysanthemum white rust

Species of fungus

Puccinia horiana is a species of fungus that causes chrysanthemum white rust, is a disease of plant species of the genus Chrysanthemum.

== Origin and spread ==
Chrysanthemum white rust (CWR) was first identified in Japan in 1895. The fungus Puccinia horiana was first described and published by German mycologist Paul Christoph Hennings (1841–1908), when found on the leaves of Chrysanthemum sinense in Honshu, Japan.

It is now established throughout Asia, Europe, Australia, and South America. It has been found in the United States on several occasions, but early detection and eradication efforts have prevented the disease from becoming established.

== Symptoms ==
Plants infected by chrysanthemum white rust exhibit spots on the upper surfaces of leaves. These spots are initially pale-green to yellow in color and up to 5mm in diameter, but may turn brown as the tissue becomes necrotic. On the underside of the leaf, stems, and flower, spots develop into pink or white waxy telial clusters/pustules where teliospores develop. Pustules are able to form on any green tissue of the plant, but are most common on young leaves and flower bracts.

== Disease cycle ==
Puccinia horiana is a microcyclic, autoecious rust, meaning that the fungus has two known spore stages: teliospores and basidiospores, as well as no known alternate host. Similar to other microcyclic rusts, two-celled teliospores produce unicellular basidiospores which are then dispersed via air currents. Basidiospores are disseminated 3–6 hours after development through wind and/or water. Under a laboratory setting, it has been shown to both spores need high humidity (50-90% RH) and no less than 5 hours of constant leaf wetness to germinate. Reports have shown that basidiospores can travel over 700 meters by wind. Spores of P. horiana are susceptible to desiccation at RH levels less than 90%. Due to this trait, chrysanthemum white rust is more likely to be spread via greenhouse contamination than by air, such as by human contact, improper sanitation techniques, or by keeping a constant high humidity to keep the spores viable. Symptoms begin to occur 7–10 days after penetration into the epidermis. Shortly after leaf spots appear, telial clusters will begin to form on the stems, flowers, and abaxial leaf surfaces. This is where teliospores develop. These teliospores will produce basidiospores initiating a new cycle.

== Pathogenesis ==
Similar to most rusts, CWR has 4 stages of infection:

(i) Basidospore lands on susceptible plant. Development of germ tube and infection peg begins.

(ii) Formation of small vesicles inside the host epidermis.

(iii) Formation of elongated fungal vesicles inside the host epidermis

(iv) Formation of septate fungal vesicles with branching hyphae. Here the fungus will move to infect the rest of the plant.

== Economic importance ==
Due to the popularity of chrysanthemums as an ornamental flower, there has been a large effort in preventing spread of CWR. In the United States, Phytosanitary Quarantine against CWR have been established. This means that all imports of known and/or suspected hosts of P. horiana must be inspected upon entering the country. If CWR is detected through various methods of detection, the plants are immediately eradicated. While eradication prevents significant economic loss if the pathogen were to become established, U.S. growers who receive infected plants suffer substantial losses. From 1990 - 1999, CWR was present in California from plants imported from Asia and Mexico. The average cost of eradication ranged from $5,000 - $7,000 per site, depending on size of lot and success of first eradication attempt. The costs of eradication in 2014 were estimated to be $788 - $11,000 respectively. Direct and indirect financial losses from CWR infestations in the U.S. from 1992 - 1997 were estimated to be $2 million. Establishment of CWR may have devastating consequences, it has been shown that Turkey and Poland experience anywhere from 80% to 100% crop loss, which is significant as they are the top producers of Chrysanthemums.

== Management ==
Infection of CWR is systemic. By creating such a systemic infection, P. horiana has the potential to overwinter in plants as a form of protection. The best form of prevention for CWR is to purchase plants, seeds, and materials from reputable sources to avoid P. horiana from ever entering the facility. Proper sanitation of greenhouse or garden equipment and materials is also an important preventative measure.

Propiconazole has been shown to be an effective fungistatic. Propiconazole's mode of action blocks the biosynthesis of ergosterols, which is critical to the formation of cell walls of fungi. This stops the growth of the fungus, effectively preventing further infection and/or invasion of host tissues

APHIS outlines management practices in three different categories for CWR.

=== Exclusion ===
- Maintain production area at less than preferred humidity for spore germination and survival
- Follow specific sanitation protocols for personnel
- Train personnel on symptoms and proper management practices
- Avoid over and under-story of known hosts
- Confirm that host stock comes from CWR free nursery
- Inspect plants as soon as they arrive
- Cuttings should be treated with fungicide before planting
- Separate mother stock from main production area

=== Prevention ===
- Use proper fungicide program for CWR on susceptible plants.
- Clean debris around shipments
- Avoid product returns to nursery stock from receivers in quarantined areas

=== Monitoring ===
- Nursery personnel should attend CWR workshops
- Separate host plants to avoid spread
- Identify sources of disease recognition
- Record keeping
- Contact Department of Agriculture in your state if CWR is found

== Susceptible and Resistant Varieties ==
=== Susceptible ===
- Pot mums, spray mums, and garden mums ( Dendranthema X grandiflorum = Chrysanthemum morifolium )
- Nippon daisy ( Nipponicanthemum nipponicum = C. nipponicum )
- High daisy ( C. pacificum = Ajania pacifica, C. serotinum, C. uliginosum )
- Arctic daisy ( Chrysanthemum arcticum, C. boreale, C. indicum )
- Nojigiku ( Chrysanthemum japonense )
- Ryuno-giku ( Chrysanthemum japonicum )
- Shio-giku ( Chrysanthemum shiwogiku )
- ( Chrysanthemum yoshinaganthum )
- ( Dendranthema zawadskii, C. zawadskiii, D. yezoense, C. yezoense)
- ( Leucanthemella serotina )

=== Resistant ===
- Annual chrysanthemum ( C. carinatum )
- Crown chrysanthemum ( C. coronarium )
- Pyrethrum ( Tanacetum coccineum = C. coccineum )
- Marguerite daisy ( Argyanthemum frutescens )
- Ox-eye daisy ( Leucanthemum vulgare )
- Shasta daisy ( Leucanthemum X superbum = C. maximum )
- Corn marigold ( C. segetum )

== See also ==
- List of Puccinia species
