= List of Rhagoletis species =

This is a list of species of the tephritid fruit fly genus Rhagoletis. As of 2006, 70 species have been described.

- Rhagoletis acuticornis (Steyskal)
- Rhagoletis adusta Foote
- Rhagoletis almatensis Rohdendorf
- Rhagoletis alternata (Fallén)
- Rhagoletis bagheera Richter & Kandybina
- Rhagoletis basiola (Osten Sacken)
- Rhagoletis basiola Osten Sacken
- Rhagoletis batava Hering
- Rhagoletis berberidis Jermy
- Rhagoletis berberis Curran
- Rhagoletis bezziana (Hendel)
- Rhagoletis blanchardi Aczél
- Rhagoletis boycei Cresson
- Rhagoletis caucasica Kandybina & Richter
- Rhagoletis cerasi (Linnaeus) cherry fruit fly
- Rhagoletis chionanthi Bush
- Rhagoletis chumsanica (Rohdendorf)
- Rhagoletis cingulata (Loew) eastern cherry fruit fly
- Rhagoletis completa (Cresson) Walnut Husk Fly
- Rhagoletis conversa (Brèthes)
- Rhagoletis cornivora Bush
- Rhagoletis ebbettsi Bush
- Rhagoletis electromorpha Berlocher
- Rhagoletis emiliae Richter
- Rhagoletis fausta (Osten Sacken)
- Rhagoletis ferruginea Hendel
- Rhagoletis flavicincta Enderlein
- Rhagoletis flavigenualis Hering
- Rhagoletis indifferens (Curran) cherry fruit fly
- Rhagoletis jamaicensis Foote
- Rhagoletis juglandis (Cresson) walnut-husk-infesting fly
- Rhagoletis juniperina Marcovitch
- Rhagoletis kurentsovi (Rohdendorf)
- Rhagoletis lycopersella Smyth
- Rhagoletis macquartii (Loew)
- Rhagoletis magniterebra (Rohdendorf)
- Rhagoletis meigenii (Loew)
- Rhagoletis mendax (Curran) blueberry maggot
- Rhagoletis metallica (Schiner)
- Rhagoletis mongolica Kandybina
- Rhagoletis nicaraguensis Hernández-Ortiz & Frías
- Rhagoletis nigripes Rohdendorf
- Rhagoletis nova (Schiner)
- Rhagoletis ochraspis (Wiedemann)
- Rhagoletis osmanthi Bush
- Rhagoletis penela Foote
- Rhagoletis persimilis Bush
- Rhagoletis pomonella (Walsh) apple maggot fly, railroad worm
- Rhagoletis psalida Hendel
- Rhagoletis ramosae Hernández-Ortiz
- Rhagoletis reducta Hering
- Rhagoletis rhytida Hendel
- Rhagoletis ribicola Doane
- Rhagoletis rohdendorfi Korneyev & Merz
- Rhagoletis rumpomaculata Hardy
- Rhagoletis samojlovitshae (Rohdendorf)
- Rhagoletis scutellata Zia
- Rhagoletis solanophaga Hernández-Ortiz & Frías
- Rhagoletis stepanae Te Tit Hermanandante
- Rhagoletis striatella Wulp
- Rhagoletis suavis (Loew) Walnut Husk Maggot
- Rhagoletis tabellaria (Fitch)
- Rhagoletis tomatis Foote
- Rhagoletis triangularis Hernández-Ortiz & Frías
- Rhagoletis turanica (Rohdendorf)
- Rhagoletis turpiniae Hernández-Ortiz
- Rhagoletis willinki Aczél
- Rhagoletis zephyria Snow
- Rhagoletis zernyi Hendel
- Rhagoletis zoqui Bush
