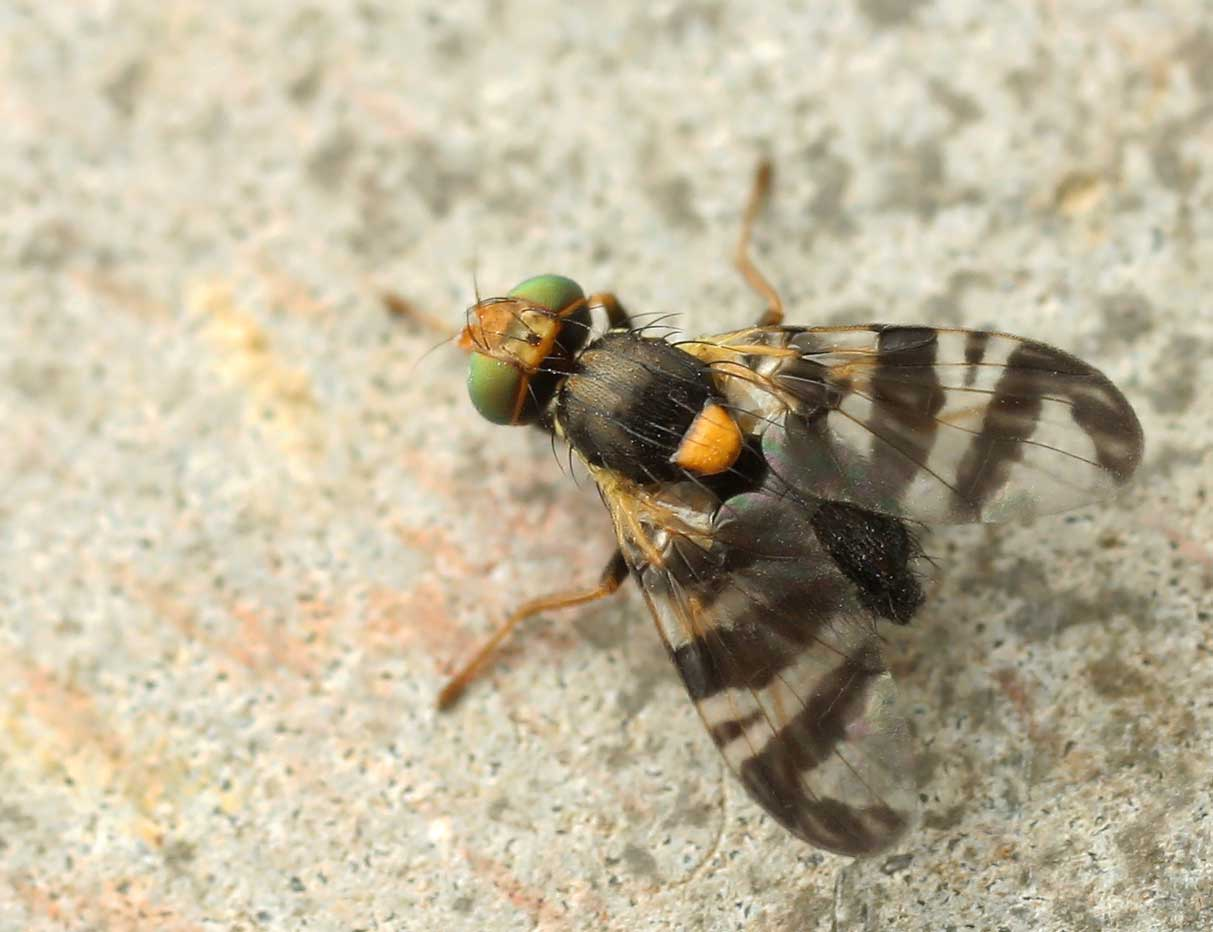
- Rhagoletis cerasi

Scientific classification
- Domain: Eukaryota
- Kingdom: Animalia
- Phylum: Arthropoda
- Class: Insecta
- Order: Diptera
- Family: Tephritidae
- Subfamily: Trypetinae
- Tribe: Carpomyini
- Subtribe: Carpomyina
- Genus: Rhagoletis; Loew, 1862

Species
- R. mendax; R. zephyria; R. pomonella; Lonicera fly; many others

Diversity
- ca. 70 species

Synonyms
- Megarrhagoletis Rohdendorf, 1961; Microrrhagoletis Rohdendorf, 1961; Rhagolitis Van Duzee, 1911; Zonosema Loew, 1862; Zonosena Johnson, 1903

= Rhagoletis =

Genus of flies

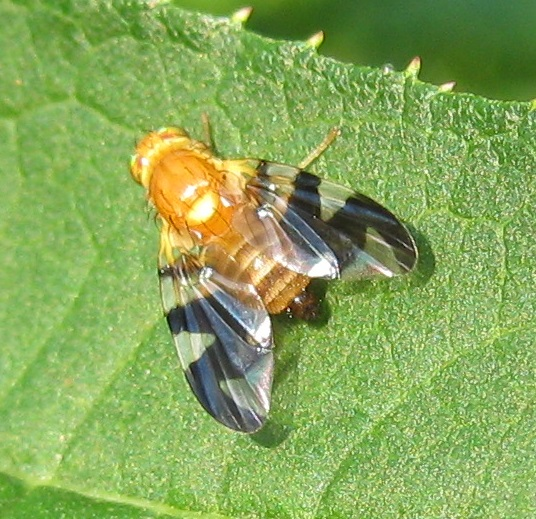
Rhagoletis suavis

Rhagoletis is a genus of tephritid fruit flies with about 70 species.

== Name ==
The genus name is partially derived from Ancient Greek rhago "a kind of spider". This possibly refers to the fact that at least R. pomonella mimics a jumping spider.

== Species ==
- Rhagoletis acuticornis (Steyskal, 1979)
- Rhagoletis adusta Foote, 1981
- Rhagoletis almatensis Rohdendorf, 1961
- Rhagoletis alternata (Fallén, 1814)
- Rhagoletis bagheera Richter & Kandybina, 1997
- Rhagoletis basiola (Osten Sacken, 1877)
- Rhagoletis batava Hering, 1958
- Rhagoletis berberidis Jermy, 1961
- Rhagoletis berberis Curran, 1932
- Rhagoletis bezziana (Hendel, 1931)
- Rhagoletis blanchardi Aczel, 1954
- Rhagoletis boycei Cresson, 1929
- Rhagoletis brncici Frías, 2001
- Rhagoletis caucasica Kandybina & Richter, 1976
- Rhagoletis cerasi (Linnaeus, 1758) – cherry fruit fly
- Rhagoletis chionanthi Bush, 1966
- Rhagoletis chumsanica (Rohdendorf, 1961)
- Rhagoletis cingulata (Loew, 1862) – eastern cherry fruit fly
- Rhagoletis completa Cresson, 1929
- Rhagoletis conversa (Brethes, 1919)
- Rhagoletis cornivora Bush, 1966
- Rhagoletis ebbettsi Bush, 1966
- Rhagoletis electromorpha Berlocher, 1984
- Rhagoletis emiliae Richter, 1974
- Rhagoletis fausta (Osten Sacken, 1877)
- Rhagoletis ferruginea Hendel, 1927
- Rhagoletis flavicincta Enderlein, 1934
- Rhagoletis flavigenualis Hering, 1958
- Rhagoletis freidbergi Korneyev & Korneyev, 2019
- Rhagoletis indifferens Curran, 1932 – western cherry fruit fly
- Rhagoletis jamaicensis Foote, 1981
- Rhagoletis juglandis Cresson, 1920 – walnut husk fly
- Rhagoletis juniperina Marcovitch, 1915
- Rhagoletis kurentsovi (Rohdendorf, 1961)
- Rhagoletis lycopersella Smyth, 1960
- Rhagoletis macquartii (Loew, 1873)
- Rhagoletis magniterebra (Rohdendorf, 1961)
- Rhagoletis meigenii (Loew, 1844)
- Rhagoletis mendax Curran, 1932 – blueberry maggot
- Rhagoletis metallica (Schiner, 1868)
- Rhagoletis mongolica Kandybina, 1972
- Rhagoletis nicaraguensis Hernández-Ortiz, 1999
- Rhagoletis nova (Schiner, 1868)
- Rhagoletis ochraspis (Wiedemann, 1830)
- Rhagoletis osmanthi Bush, 1966
- Rhagoletis penela Foote, 1981
- Rhagoletis persimilis Bush, 1966
- Rhagoletis pomonella (Walsh, 1867) – apple maggot fly, railroad worm
- Rhagoletis psalida Hendel, 1914
- Rhagoletis ramosae Hernandez-Ortiz, 1985
- Rhagoletis reducta Hering, 1936
- Rhagoletis rhytida Hendel, 1914
- Rhagoletis ribicola Doane, 1898
- Rhagoletis rohdendorfi Korneyev & Merz, 1997
- Rhagoletis rumpomaculata Hardy, 1964
- Rhagoletis samojlovitshae (Rohdendorf, 1961)
- Rhagoletis scutellata Zia, 1938
- Rhagoletis solanophaga Hernández-Ortiz & Frías, 1999
- Rhagoletis striatella Wulp, 1899
- Rhagoletis suavis (Loew, 1862) – walnut husk maggot
- Rhagoletis tabellaria (Fitch, 1855)
- Rhagoletis tomatis Foote, 1981
- Rhagoletis turanica (Rohdendorf, 1961)
- Rhagoletis turpiniae Hernandez-Ortiz, 1993
- Rhagoletis willinki Aczel, 1951
- Rhagoletis zephyria Snow, 1894
- Rhagoletis zernyi Hendel, 1927
- Rhagoletis zoqui Bush, 1966

Synonyms:

- Rhagoletis achraspis Aczel, 1954: Synonym of Rhagoletis tomatis Foote, 1981
- Rhagoletis caurina Doane, 1899: Synonym of Urophora caurina (Doane, 1899)
- Rhagoletis grindeliae Coquillett, 1908: Synonym of Urophora grindeliae (Coquillett, 1908)
- Rhagoletis juniperinus Marcovitch, 1915: Synonym of Rhagoletis juniperina Marcovitch, 1915
- Rhagoletis sapporensis Matsumura, 1916: Synonym of Matsumurania sapporensis (Matsumura, 1916)
- Rhagoletis symphoricarpi Curran, 1924: Synonym of Rhagoletis zephyria Snow, 1894
- Rhagoletis willincki Foote, 1967: Synonym of Rhagoletis willinki Aczel, 1951

== Database ==
- Tephritid Workers Database
