= Rhagoletis juglandis =

Scientific classification
- Kingdom: Animalia
- Phylum: Arthropoda
- Clade: Pancrustacea
- Class: Insecta
- Order: Diptera
- Family: Tephritidae
- Genus: Rhagoletis
- Species: R. juglandis

Binomial name
- Rhagoletis juglandis Cresson, 1920

Species of fly

Rhagoletis juglandis, also known as the walnut husk fly, is a species of tephritid or fruit fly in the family Tephritidae. It is closely related to the walnut husk maggot Rhagoletis suavis (Loew, 1862). This species of fly belongs to the R. suavis group, which has a natural history consistent with allopatric speciation. The flies belonging to this group are morphologically distinguishable.

The adult form of this fly is around 4 mm long. R. juglandis are distributed in Arizona, California, Texas, Kansas, and Mexico. The species infests the fruits of several species of walnut trees including Juglans regia (the English or Persian walnut), Juglans rupestris (a species of walnut indigenous to Arizona and Texas), Juglans hindsii (the California black walnut), and the Arizona walnut Juglans major.

The larvae are small and infest walnut fruits, having hatched from eggs laid by adult females under the surface of the husk of the walnut. The insect overwinters as a pupa in the soil, and adults emerge in mid to late summer. R. juglandis engages in superparasitism, during which conspecifics infest the same host, even when there are still uninfested hosts available.

Although courtship behavior is rare in the Rhagoletis genus, male flies demonstrate low-frequency wing vibration, accompanied by airborne infrasound; they also turn their wing edges upward. R. juglandis participate in a resource-defense mating system. Females follow resource-based cues such as ripeness (color), whereas males follow females for more opportunities to mate. The flies also respond to sex ratio to alter the amount of time that copulation takes. When male density is high, copulation times are longer.

== Description ==
R. juglandis was first described by E. T. Cresson, Jr. in 1920 from material from the exocarp of fruit of Juglans regia (the English or Persian walnut tree) in Arizona. The species was first named the black walnut fly in literature. This served to differentiate it from the walnut husk maggot Rhagoletis suavis. However, the common name walnut husk fly was later proposed and accepted for this species.

== Taxonomy ==
R. juglandis belongs to the genus Rhagoletis and the family Tephritidae. It is closely related to Rhagoletis suavis (Loew, 1862), Rhagoletis completa (Cresson, 1929), Rhagoletis boycei (Cresson, 1929), Rhagoletis zoqui (Bush, 1966), and Rhagoletis ramosae (Hernández-Ortiz, 1985). These species do not generally overlap in geographic range in North America, but there has been some described sympatry and parapatry. R. suavis group flies have history that is consistent with allopatric speciation. Morphological differences implying sexual selection support specification, including that the different walnut flies are morphologically distinguishable in wing pattern, body coloration and markings.

== Morphology ==
The eggs appear a pearly white color when first laid, but progressively darken as the embryo develops. The eggs are somewhat curved, with one end slightly tapered and the other end pointed. The eggs measure to be around 0.8 mm by 0.3 mm.

Upon developing into larvae, these flies take on a transparent look in their early stages and turn creamy white or light yellow as they mature. In addition, they have prominent anterior and posterior orange-yellow spiracles. The larvae measure to be around 9 mm by 2 mm.

The pupae are described as looking like grains of wheat, with a barrel shape and straw color. The pupae measure around 5 mm by 3 mm.

As adults, the main body color of the adult fly is tawny with lemon yellow markings. The wings look translucent and have three parallel transverse dark bands. The distal band continues along the costal margin to the apex (dorsal region). The abdomen of the fly has dark transverse bands on the dorsum. The female fly is larger than the male, and has a more pointed end of its abdomen due to the telescoping ovipositor. Females grow to be around 4 mm long in body length.

== Distribution and habitat ==
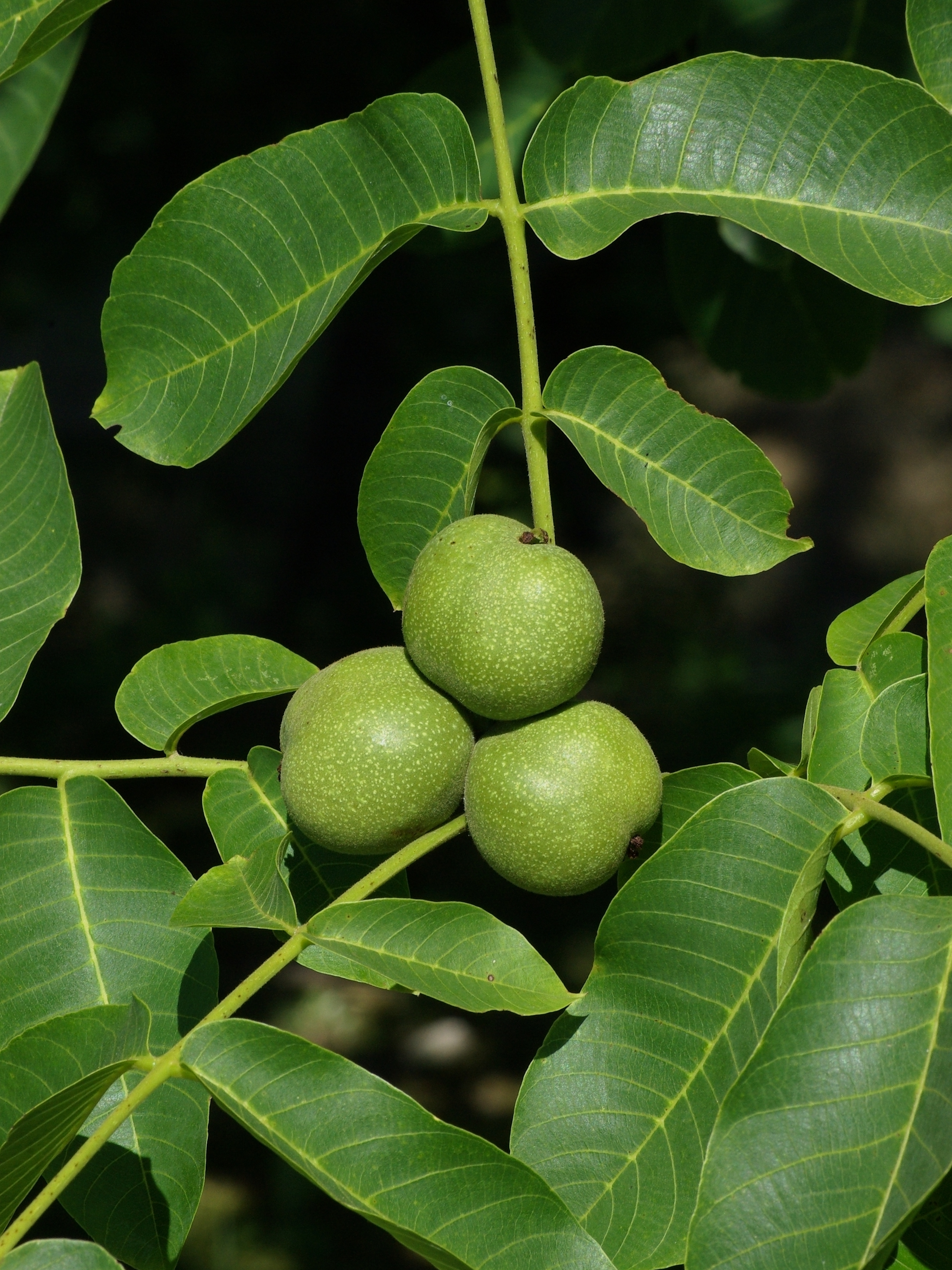
Juglans regia, leaves and fruit, in a garden, France

There are recorded sightings of R.juglandis in Arizona, California, Texas, and Kansas.

Hosts of R. juglandis infestations include Juglans regia (the English or Persian walnut), Juglans rupestris (a species of walnut indigenous to Arizona and Texas), and Juglans hindsii (the California black walnut). Particular cultivars of J. regia may be more infested than others because of relative softness and thickness of walnut husks. 'Eureka' 'Klondike,' 'Payne,' 'Franquette' and 'Ehrhardt' cultivars of J. regia are among the most susceptible to infestation.

In addition, R. juglandis has been found to infest the Arizona walnut Juglans major in the southwestern United States and Mexico.

This North American pest also reached Europe in the late 1980s and is causing important damage to its principal host, the walnut.

The husk fly also infests ripe apricot and peach fruits, usually if infested walnuts are located within flying distance.

== Life history ==
=== Oviposition ===
R. juglandis is univoltine, similar to its close relative R. suavis. Experiments have shown that physical host fruit stimuli such as color and shape enhance oogenesis in the first egg maturation cycle; this does require sufficient nutritional value of the fruit. Female flies do not completely develop eggs for oviposition until 7 to 14 days after emerging from the soil. Copulation and oviposition occur in the morning or late afternoon and evening. The female searches for a suitable spot for oviposition; when one is found, she forces her ovipositor several millimeters into the husk of the walnut. She then moves her body around in a semicircle to lacerate the tissue of the inner husk and create a cavity for the eggs. The female oviposits eggs below the surface of the husk of walnuts in batches of about 15 eggs. Oviposition takes several minutes. The spot of oviposition darkens after one or two days; then, the egg cavity can be detected with the naked eye.

=== Larvae and pupae ===
The larval stage takes 3 to 5 weeks. The larvae hatch from eggs after 4 to 7 days and immediately tunnel into the inner portion of the husk of the walnut. After maturation, as completion of development usually occurs after the infested walnut falls off the tree to the ground, the larvae exit the decaying husk and go onto the soil, in which they burrow and transform into the prepupal stage within 8 to 24 hours. The complete transformation to pupae takes a few days.

Larvae spend the winter in the pupal stage in the soil at around a depth of 1 to 4 inches. A study examined the relationship between individual pupal size and the depth of soil larvae were found for Rhagoletis juglandis and Rhagoletis suavis. Larger pupae were found in deeper soil, most likely because burrowing deep into soil has a high energy cost. Flies in deeper soil depths had increased mortality; they were less likely than flies who burrowed to a shallow depth to emerge from overwintering. Threats to the larvae in shallow depths include predators like ants and parasites like wasps from the genus Coptera. Deeper soil, however, costs the larvae energy and leads to a higher risk of mortality.

In mid to late summer, adult flies emerge from soil prior to ripening of walnut husks and emergence declines in number by September.

== Food resources ==
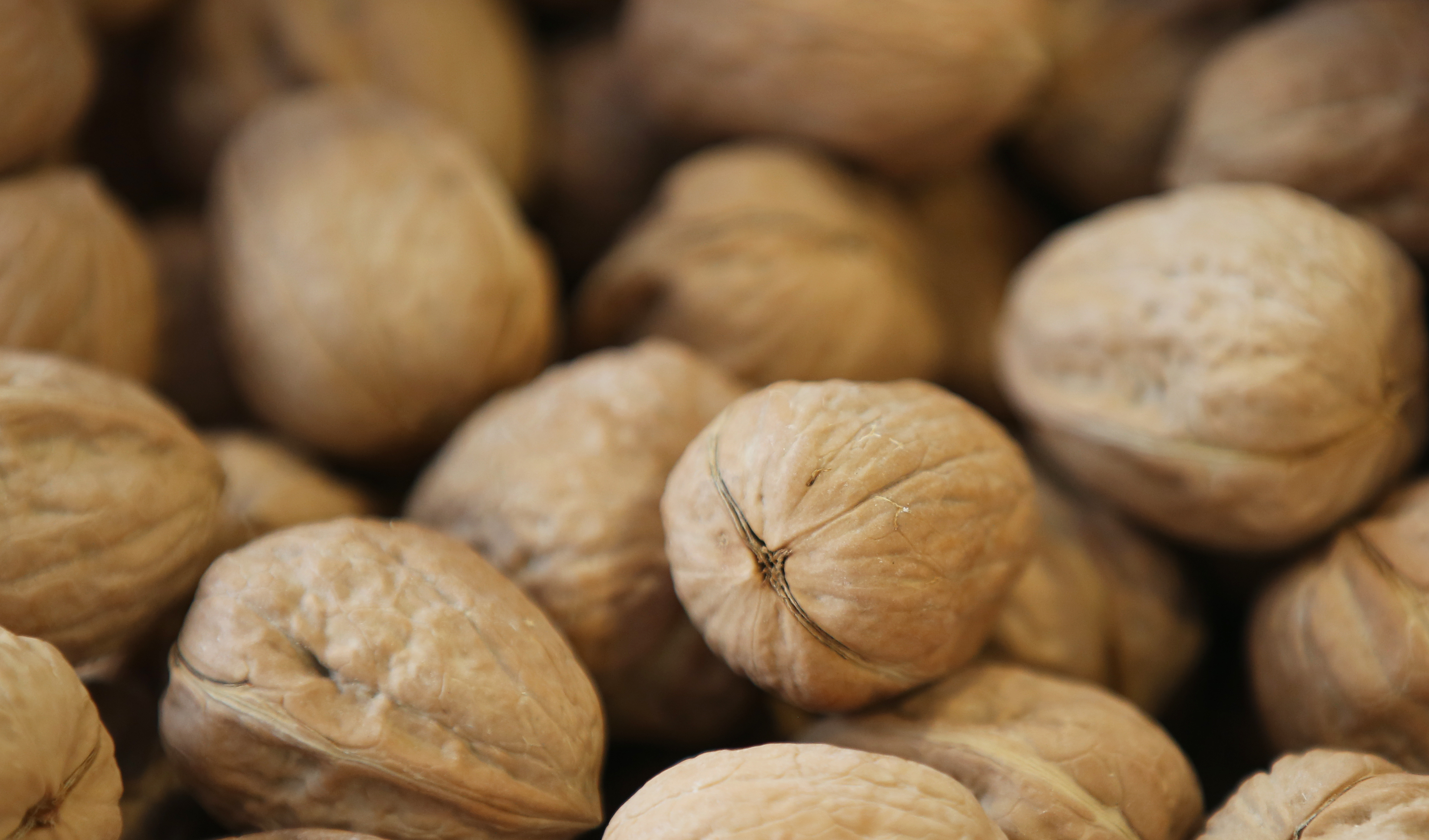
Walnut, the site of oviposition

R. juglandis flies deposit their eggs in the husks of developing walnuts, on which the larvae feed and develop. Adult flies feed on dew and plant sap and can also dissolve solid deposits on foliage for nutrients using saliva. Feeding is most active in the beginning of the day and in the evening.

== Behavior ==
=== Mating ===
Courtship behaviors are generally rare in the genus. However, R. juglandis is unique in its courtship signaling behaviors. Male flies demonstrate low-frequency wing vibration, accompanied by airborne infrasound. These bouts of vibration typically last from 5 seconds-15 minutes. Male flies raise their wings during these displays, turning the edges upward.

R. juglandis participate in a resource-defense mating system. Females are inherently aware of resource-based cues and males follow females in order to obtain more opportunities to mate. For instance, females have been shown to have innate responses to ripeness cues. Males then respond based on encounter rates with females at different levels of ripeness. Experimentally, females were shown to land more on green models than yellow or brown ones, and experienced males followed the same patterns. There were more mating interactions on green models.

In addition, researchers have found that flies seem to internalize changes in sex ratio in the surrounding environment and respond accordingly. The effect of male density on copulation is stronger than female density. Individual flies copulate for longer in these male-biased environments.

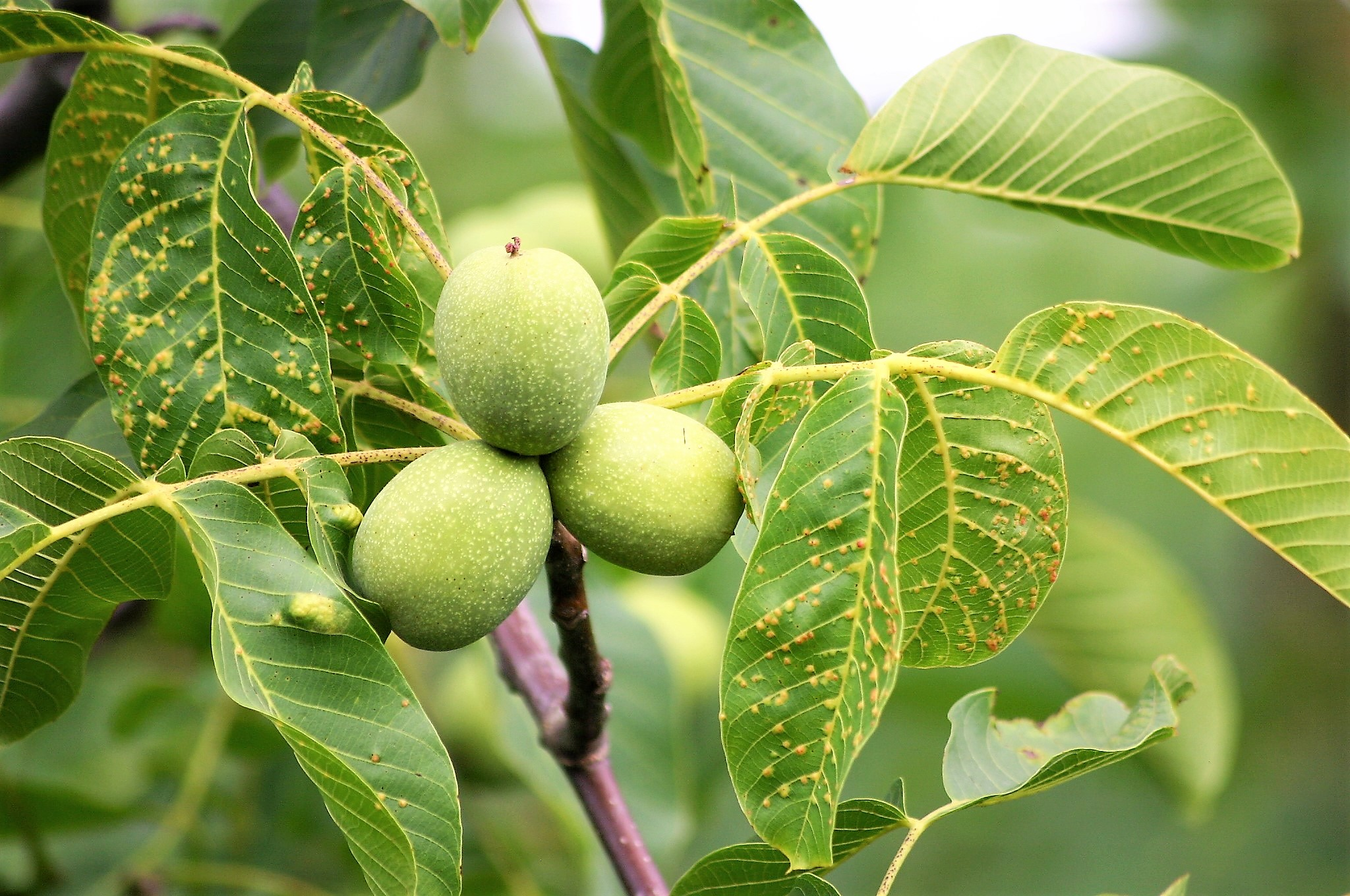
Walnut Tree, typical site of infestation

=== Superparasitism ===
Superparasitism is the use of hosts that already contain a brood from the same species of parasite. R. juglandis females drag their ovipositors on the husk of the walnut after oviposition, which suggests that they have released a marking pheromone, a behavior typical of the Rhagoletis genus. However, the flies reinfest the same walnuts, and even the same oviposition sites, created by individuals of the same species. This occurs even when there are still uninfested hosts available. In large, less-infested walnut fruits, adult fly size has been found to be larger and larval survival is higher.

== Interactions with humans ==
R. juglandis infests walnut trees, which has economic importance due to the cultivation of walnuts for human use. A close relative, R. completa, is known to infest peaches growing near walnuts. Under artificial conditions, females have oviposited in other fruits and vegetables, but larvae failed to develop.
