= Lonicera fly =

Scientific classification
- Domain: Eukaryota
- Kingdom: Animalia
- Phylum: Arthropoda
- Class: Insecta
- Order: Diptera
- Family: Tephritidae
- Subtribe: Carpomyina
- Genus: Rhagoletis
- Species: R. mendax × R. zephyria

Hybrid fly

The Lonicera fly, a hybrid in the genus Rhagoletis, is a North American fruit fly of the family Tephritidae. Its larvae feed on the berries of species of introduced honeysuckle (Lonicera) that were brought to America within the last 250 years as ornamental plants. A research team led by Dietmar Schwarz has argued that it most likely developed within that time by hybridization of two other species: R. mendax, the blueberry maggot, and R. zephyria, the snowberry maggot. Few cases of animal species arising from hybridization are known, although with DNA analysis more are being found.
