= R. ferruginea =

R. ferruginea may refer to:

- Rhagoletis ferruginea, a fruit fly species
- Rollinia ferruginea, a plant species endemic to Brazil
- Rusina ferruginea, the brown rustic, a moth species found in Europe

== See also ==
- Ferruginea (disambiguation)
