= R. metallica =

R. metallica may refer to:

- Rhagoletis metallica, a fruit fly species
- Rhytidoponera metallica, the green-head ant, green ant, or green-headed ant, or metallic pony ant, an ant species found throughout Australia

== See also ==
- Metallica (disambiguation)
