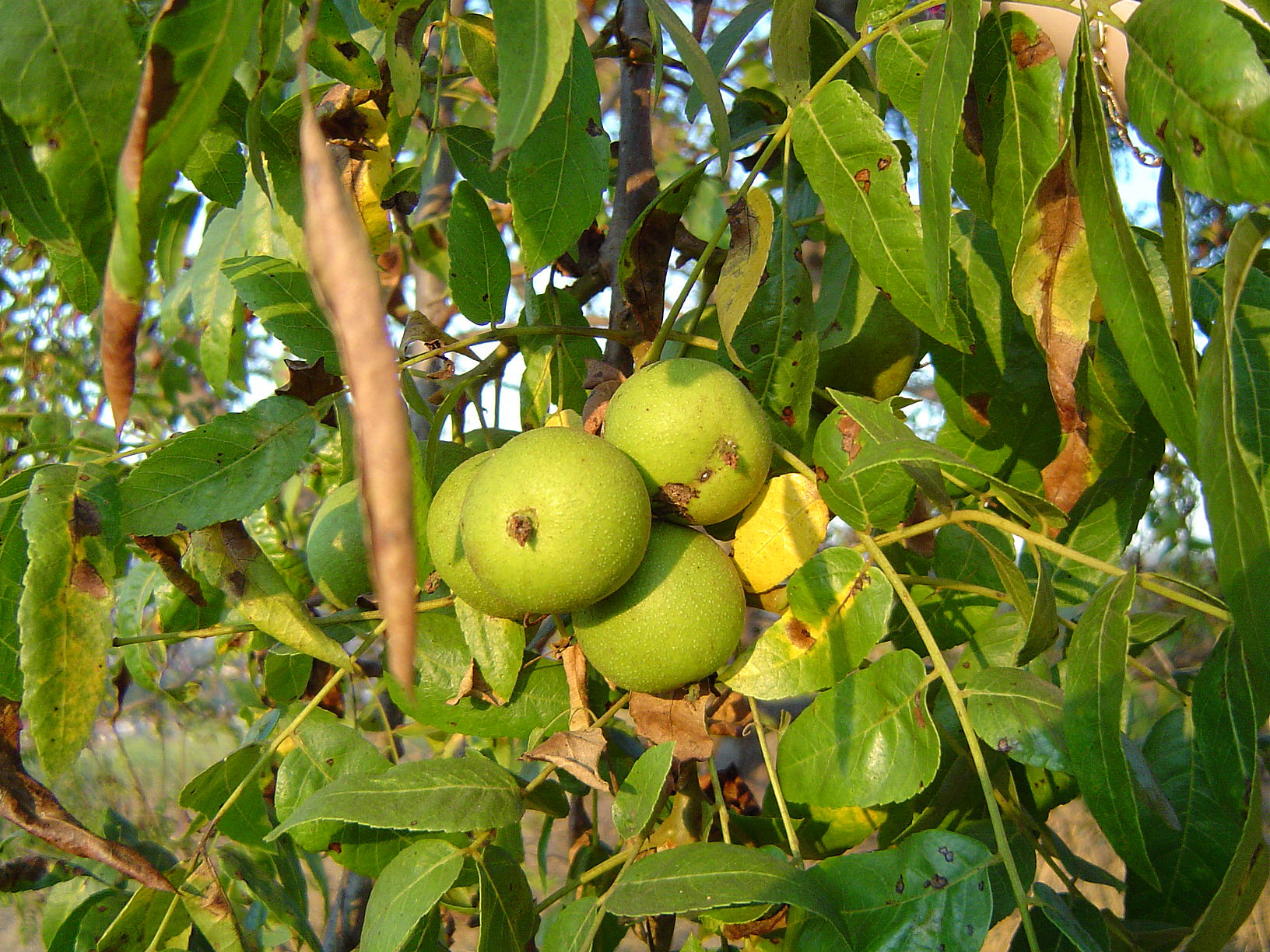

Conservation status
- Near Threatened (IUCN 3.1)

Scientific classification
- Kingdom: Plantae
- Clade: Embryophytes
- Clade: Tracheophytes
- Clade: Angiosperms
- Clade: Eudicots
- Clade: Rosids
- Order: Fagales
- Family: Juglandaceae
- Genus: Juglans
- Section: Juglans sect. Rhysocaryon
- Species: J. californica

Binomial name
- Juglans californica S. Wats.
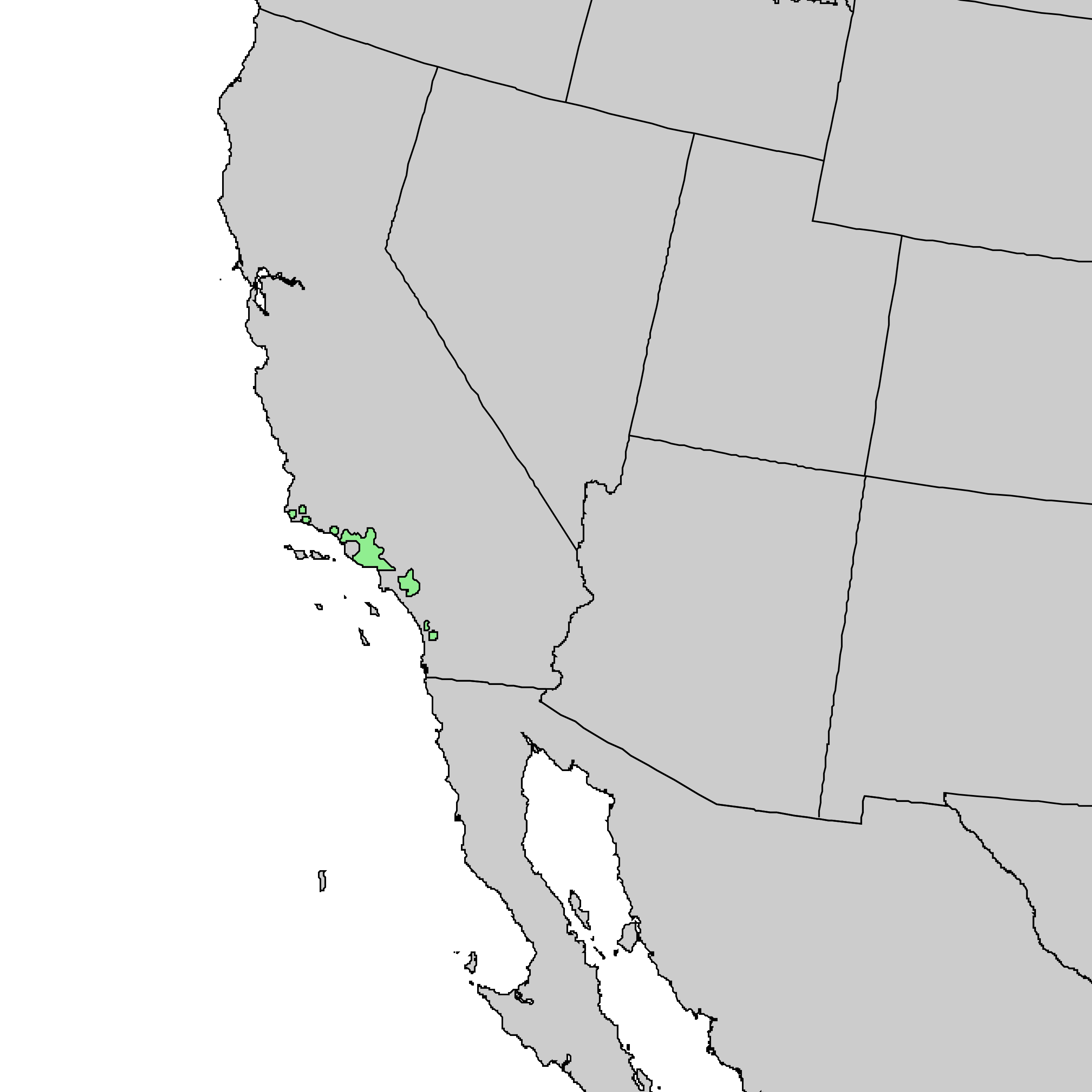
- Natural range

= Juglans californica =

Species of tree

Juglans californica, the California black walnut, also called the California walnut, or the Southern California black walnut, is a large shrub or small tree (about 20–49 feet (6.1–14.9 m)) of the walnut family, Juglandaceae, endemic to the Central Valley and the Coast Range valleys from Northern to Southern California.

== Distribution ==
Juglans californica is generally found in the valleys and adjacent slopes of the California Coast Ranges, Transverse Ranges, and Peninsular Ranges. It grows as part of mixed woodlands, and also on slopes and in valleys wherever conditions are favorable. It is threatened by development and overgrazing. Some native stands remain in urban Los Angeles in the Santa Monica Mountains, Hollywood Hills, and Repetto Hills. J. californica grows in riparian woodlands, either in single species stands or mixed with California's oaks (Quercus spp.) and cottonwoods (Populus fremontii). Climate model predictions indicate that Juglans californica may expand its range northward in response to warmer and drier conditions, potentially occupying areas currently inhabited by the endangered Juglans hindsii (Northern California black walnut).

== Description ==
Juglans californica can be either a large shrub with 1–5 trunks, or a small, single-trunked tree. The main trunk can fork close to the ground, making it look like two trees that have grown together, then diverged. It has thick bark, deeply channeled or furrowed at maturity. It has large, pinnately compound leaves with 11–19 lanceolate leaflets with toothed margins and no hair in the vein angles. It has a small hard nut in a shallowly grooved, thick shell that is difficult to remove. The tallest Juglans californica trees can reach up to 11 meters in height, though only about 10% of the population exceeds 5 meters.

== Uses ==
=== Food ===
The nuts are edible and are eaten by the Chumash people of the Channel Islands of California and Ventura County as well as by the Tongva of Los Angeles County, and the Ohlone. They are not grown commercially as food.

=== Cultivation ===
Juglans californica is cultivated throughout California to support the walnut industry, used as a rootstock in English walnut orchards. It is also cultivated as an ornamental tree where it is planted in California native plant, xeriscape, and wildlife habitat gardens and natural landscaping in California, and in Hawaii.

=== Traditional medicine ===
The leaves were made into a decoction by Ohlone people to thin the blood, and Chumash people made a tea from the leaves for the same purpose.

== Taxonomy ==
Some authorities (e.g. the California Native Plant Society) combine this species with Juglans hindsii. On the other hand, a 2007 molecular analysis of the genus suggests J. californica is sister to the remaining black walnuts (section Rhysocaryon). This article follows the conventions of The Jepson Manual.
