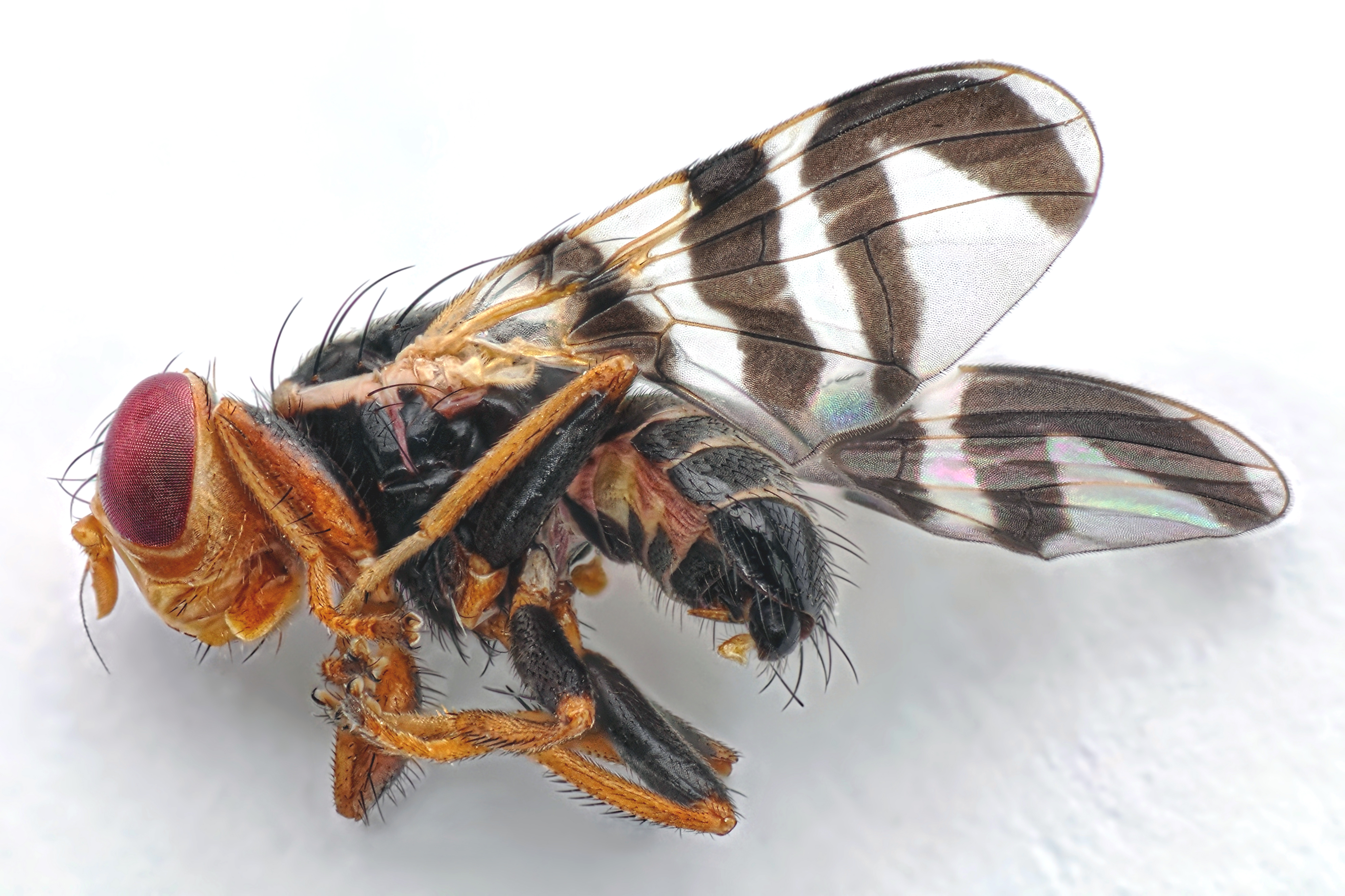

Scientific classification
- Kingdom: Animalia
- Phylum: Arthropoda
- Class: Insecta
- Order: Diptera
- Family: Tephritidae
- Genus: Rhagoletis
- Species: R. batava

Binomial name
- Rhagoletis batava Hering, 1958

= Rhagoletis batava =

Species of fly

Rhagoletis batava (seabuckthorn fruit fly) is a species of fruit fly in the genus Rhagoletis of the family Tephritidae. Rhagoletis batava larvae feed inside fruit flesh, and can be important pest of seabuckthorn. This species is very similar to Rhagoletis cerasi (European cherry fruit fly)
