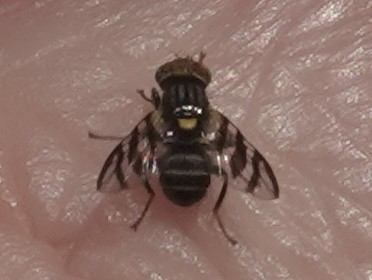

Scientific classification
- Kingdom: Animalia
- Phylum: Arthropoda
- Class: Insecta
- Order: Diptera
- Family: Tephritidae
- Genus: Rhagoletis
- Species: R. berberis

Binomial name
- Rhagoletis berberis Curran, 1932

= Rhagoletis berberis =

Species of fly

Rhagoletis berberis is a species of tephritid or fruit fly in the family Tephritidae. This species feeds on species of the genus Mahonia such as mountain grape and Oregon grape.
