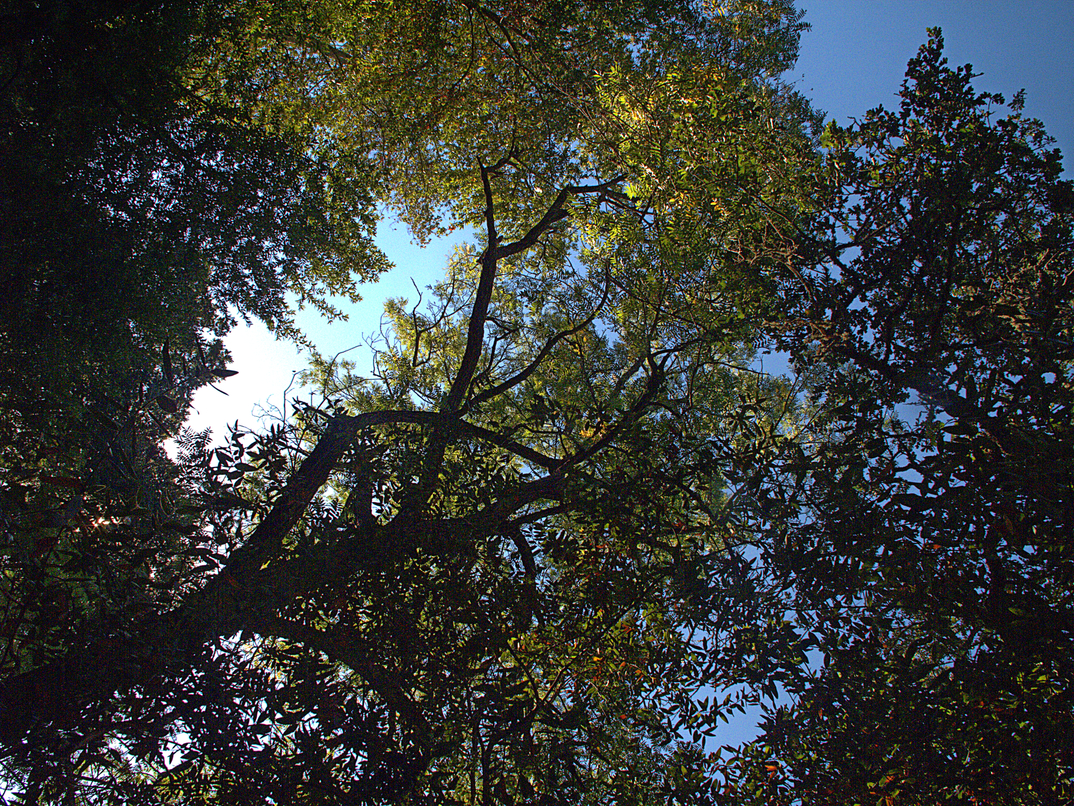

Conservation status
- Least Concern (IUCN 3.1)

Scientific classification
- Kingdom: Plantae
- Clade: Embryophytes
- Clade: Tracheophytes
- Clade: Angiosperms
- Clade: Eudicots
- Clade: Rosids
- Order: Fagales
- Family: Juglandaceae
- Genus: Juglans
- Section: Juglans sect. Rhysocaryon
- Species: J. hindsii

Binomial name
- Juglans hindsii (Jeps.) Jeps. ex R.E.Sm.
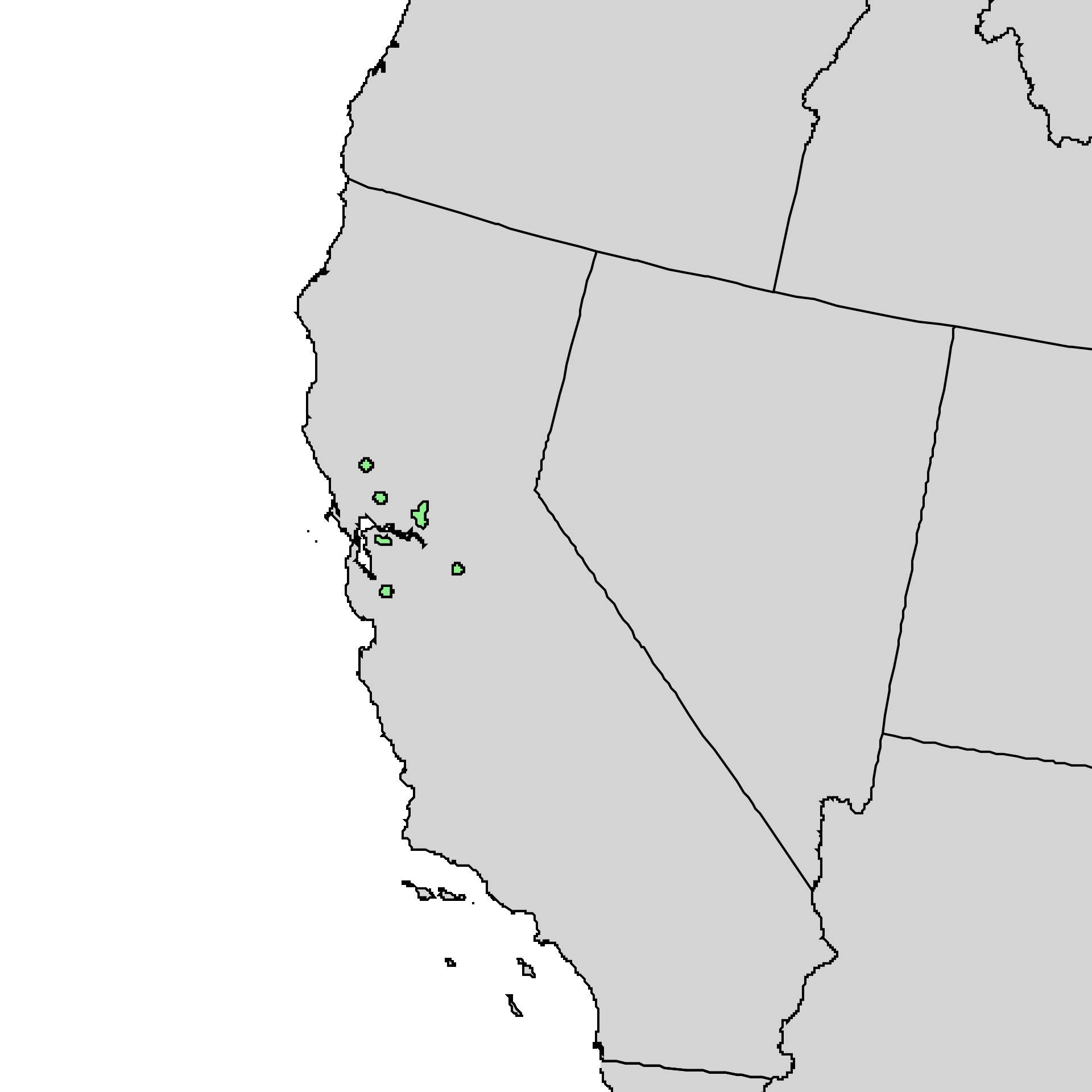
- Natural range of Juglans hindsii

= Juglans hindsii =

Species of tree

Juglans hindsii, commonly called the Northern California black walnut and Hinds's black walnut, is a species of walnut tree native to the western United States (California and Oregon). It is commonly called claro walnut by the lumber industry and woodworkers, and is the subject of some confusion over its being used as rootstock for English walnut.

== Description ==
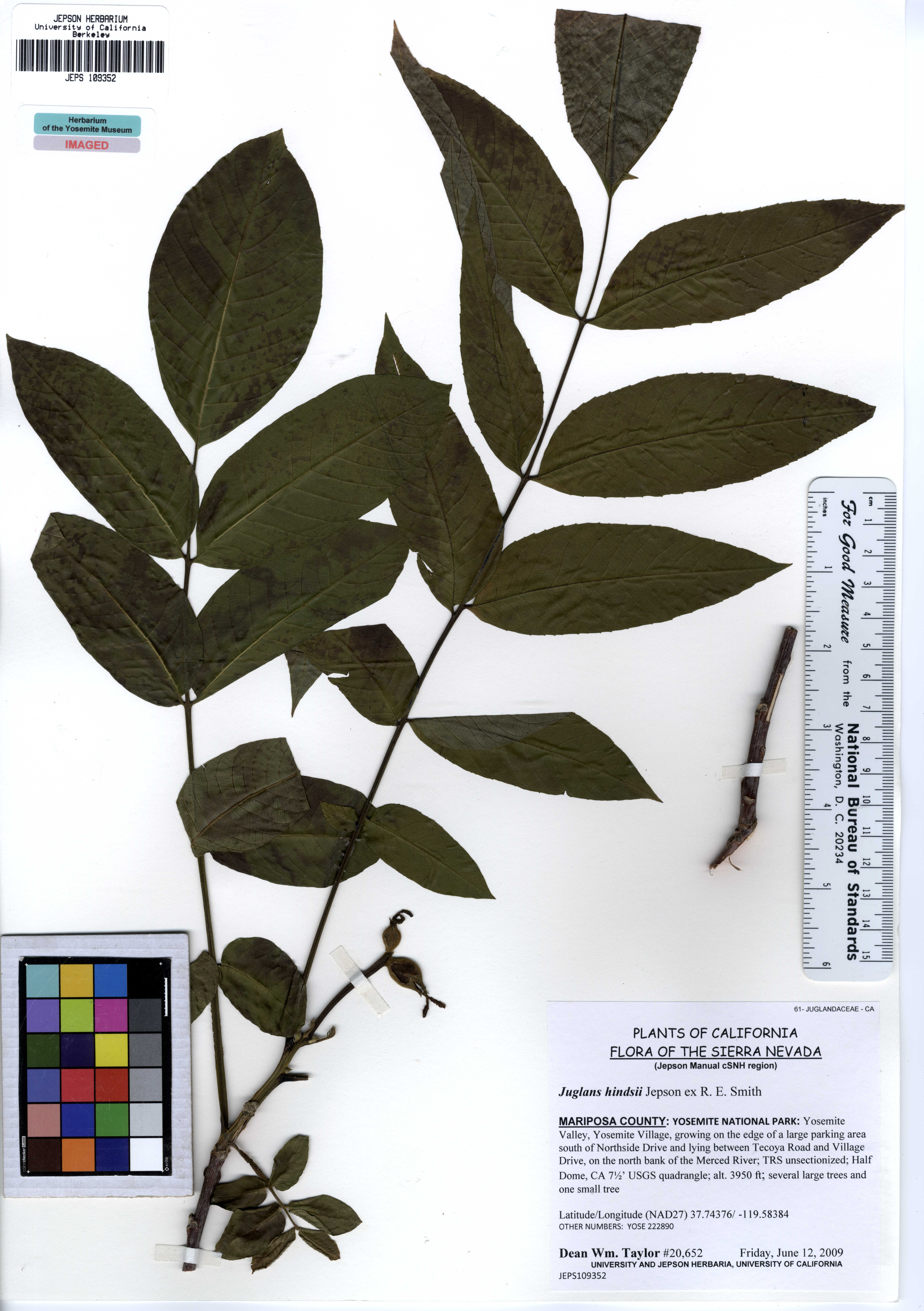
A specimen of Juglans hindsii from the Yosemite Museum

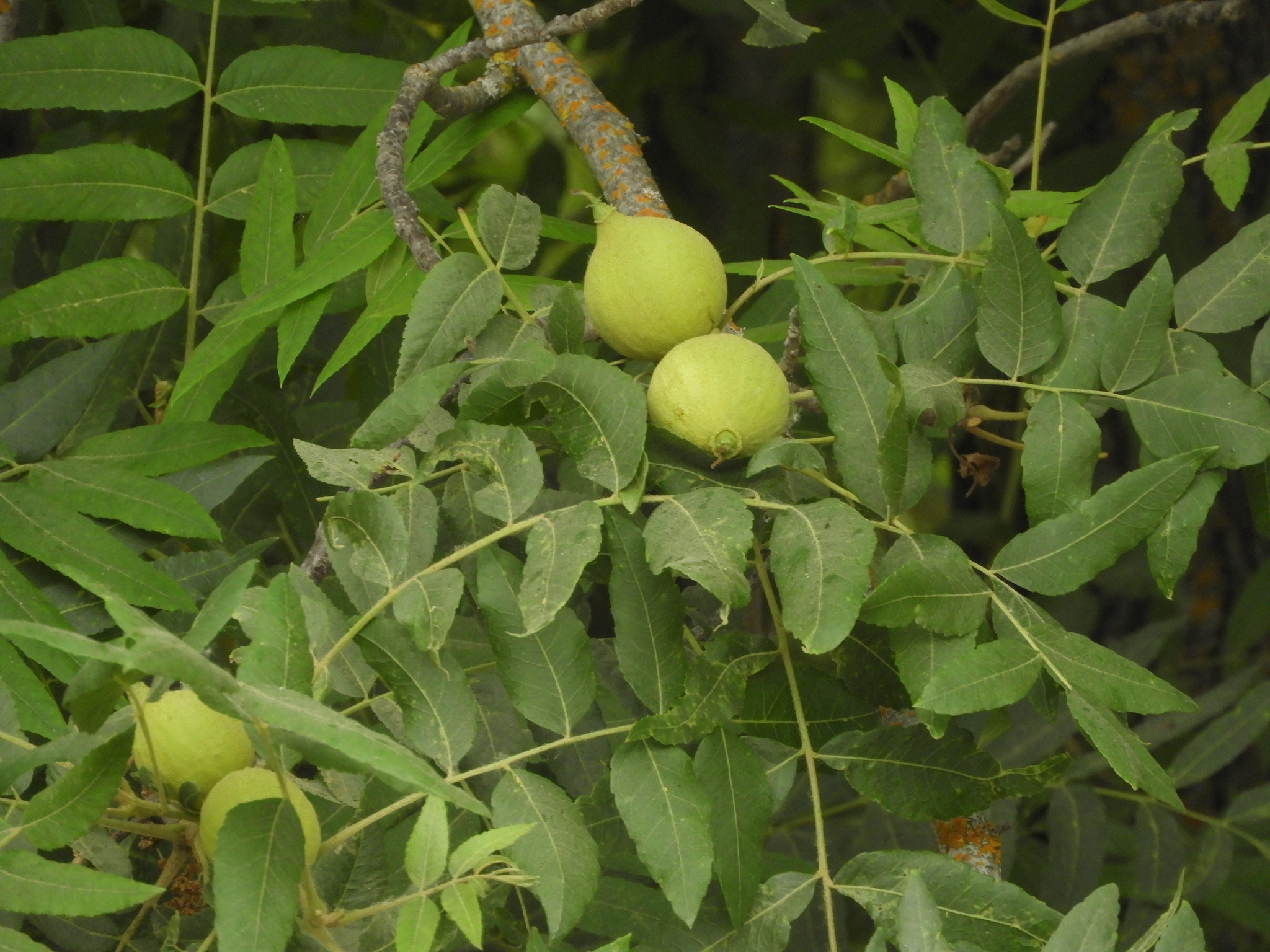
Specimen in early June

Juglans hindsii is a large tree that grows up to 7–23 metres (23–75 ft) tall and may reach over 30 m (100 ft) with enough shade. The species normally has a single erect trunk, commonly without branches in the lower half of the tree, and a crown that can be wider than the tree is tall. Trunks may reach 1.5–1.8 m (5–6 ft) in diameter near the base of the tree.

The leaf is approximately 0.3 m (1 ft) long, with 13–21 leaflets per leaf, each 5–12.5 centimetres (2–5 in) long, with dentate margins. The vein axils bear tufts of hair underneath, differentiating the species from the Southern California walnut.

The species is monoecious, with male flowers in yellow-green catkins up to 15 cm (6 in) long and females stemming from young twigs in groups of 1–3. The nut is up to 4 cm (1 1/2 in) across, with a smooth, brown, thick shell.

== Taxonomy ==
The current classification of the plant is as a distinct species. Some botanists and the 1993 edition of The Jepson Manual had classified it as Juglans californica subsp. hindsii, a subspecies of Juglans californica (Southern California black walnut).

== Distribution and habitat ==
The historical range of J. hindsii is from the San Joaquin Valley and Sacramento Valley to the inner northern California Coast Ranges and San Francisco Bay Area, in Northern California. A 2020 IUCN assessment has extended this range: north to Oregon and south to Southern California, in areas of similar habitat type. The northernmost pre-colonial J. hindsii tree was located in Douglas County, Oregon, before it was blown over in November 2017. A ring count determined the tree predated the arrival of settlers by approximately 100 years. The Native Plant Society of Oregon has also documented multiple trees of pre-colonial age in Oregon's Rogue Valley.

The tree grows in riparian woodlands, either in mono-species stands, or mixed with California oak species (Quercus spp.) and Fremont cottonwood (Populus fremontii) trees.

== Conservation ==
Juglans hindsii was formerly assessed as Seriously Endangered on the California Native Plant Society Rare Plant Inventory. In a 2019 revision, the species was upgraded to common. It is threatened by hybridization with orchard trees, urbanization, and habitat conversion to agriculture.

== Cultivation ==
Juglans hindsii has been commercially important as a rootstock for orchard stock of J. regia (English walnut) trees all over the world. It is also used as a parent to the fast-growing Luther Burbank hybrid rootstock, commonly called "Paradox" (Juglans hindsii x Juglans regia).

The Northern California walnut is cultivated by specialty California native plant nurseries. It is used as an ornamental tree in traditional and wildlife gardens, and for habitat gardens, natural landscaping projects, and climate compatible drought-tolerant gardens. The tree is also planted in habitat restoration projects.

=== Pests ===
Juglans hindsii is infested by Rhagoletis juglandis, commonly known as the walnut husk fly, which lays its eggs in the husks of walnut fruit. R. juglandis infests other varieties of walnut trees as well, such as J. regia (the English or Persian walnut), J. rupestris (native to Arizona and Texas), and J. hindsii (the California black walnut).

== Allergenicity ==
It is a severe allergen. Pollination typically occurs in spring.

== Uses ==
The nut is edible.

The wood of J. hindsii is commonly called claro walnut by the lumber industry and woodworkers. It is highly figured with a rich brown color and striking grain patterns, especially in the crotch areas, where large limbs meet the trunk. It is used in small quantities to make fine furniture and gun stocks, and sold as slabs to make large natural-top tables because of its durability, good working properties, and swirling iridescent figure.

Some confusion exists about the nature of claro walnut because J. hindsii is commonly used as the rootstock of orchard trees. The section below the original graft is claro walnut wood, while the section above is the lighter-colored English walnut. Some woodworkers take advantage of this by making the color change a feature of their work.
