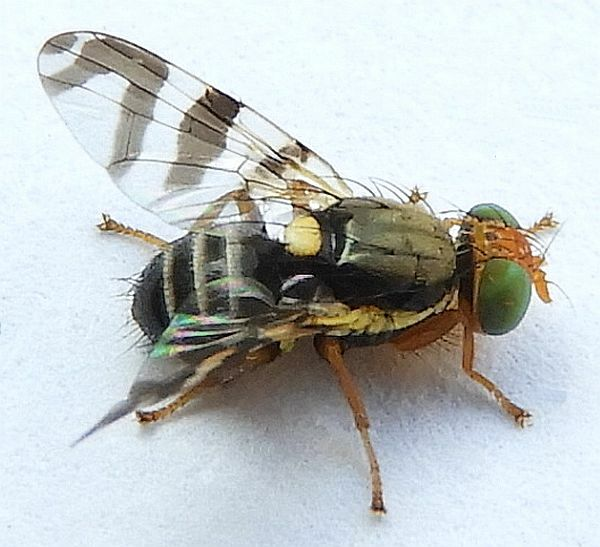

Scientific classification
- Kingdom: Animalia
- Phylum: Arthropoda
- Class: Insecta
- Order: Diptera
- Family: Tephritidae
- Tribe: Carpomyini
- Subtribe: Carpomyina
- Genus: Rhagoletis
- Species: R. cingulata

Binomial name
- Rhagoletis cingulata (Loew, 1862)

Synonyms
- Trypeta cingulata Loew, 1862

= Rhagoletis cingulata =

Species of fly

Rhagoletis cingulata, the eastern cherry fruit fly, is a species of tephritid or fruit flies in the family Tephritidae. It is found over the entire middle and eastern region of the United States from Michigan to New Hampshire, southward to Florida and also in south-eastern and south-central Canada.
