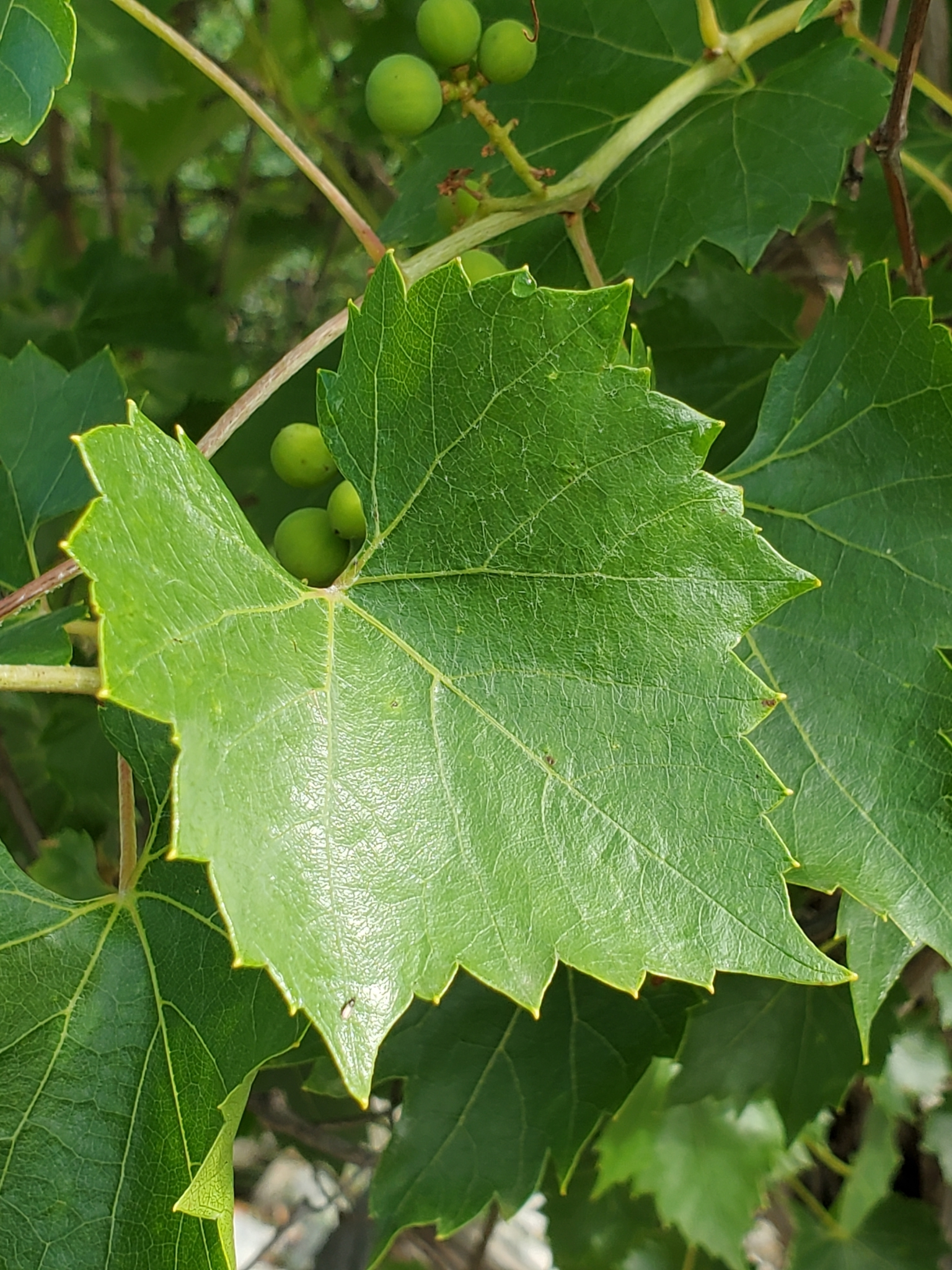

Conservation status
- Apparently Secure (NatureServe)

Scientific classification
- Kingdom: Plantae
- Clade: Tracheophytes
- Clade: Angiosperms
- Clade: Eudicots
- Clade: Rosids
- Order: Vitales
- Family: Vitaceae
- Genus: Vitis
- Species: V. monticola

Binomial name
- Vitis monticola Buckley

= Vitis monticola =

Mountain grape

Species of grapevine

Vitis monticola, commonly known as mountain grape, or sweet mountain grape, is a North American species of wild grape native to Texas. It is important to grape growers for its resistance to drought; a quality exploited both genetically in hybridization, and in grafting.

== Gallery ==
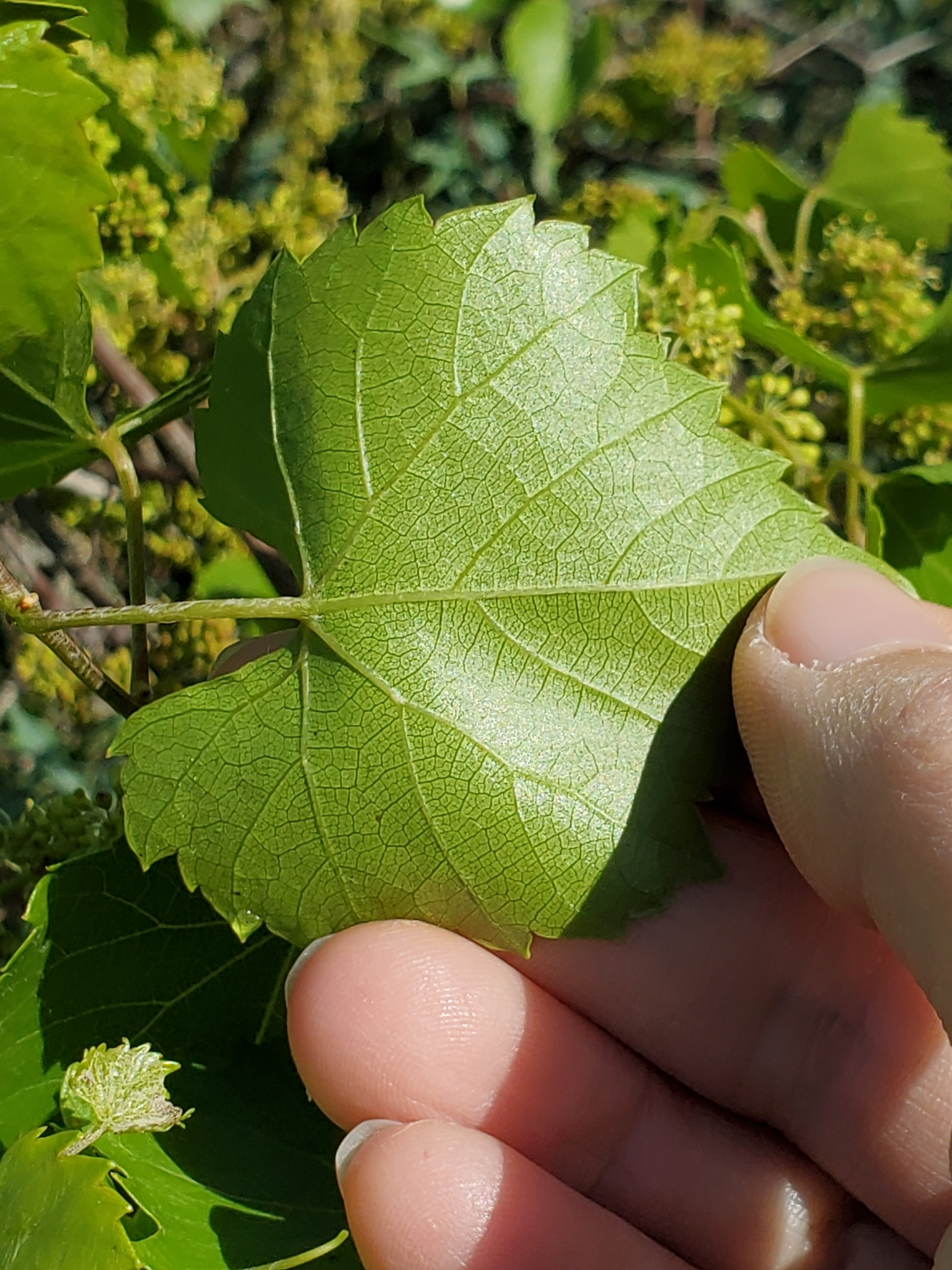
