= Rhagoletis tabellaria =

Scientific classification
- Domain: Eukaryota
- Kingdom: Animalia
- Phylum: Arthropoda
- Class: Insecta
- Order: Diptera
- Family: Tephritidae
- Genus: Rhagoletis
- Species: R. tabellaria

Binomial name
- Rhagoletis tabellaria (Fitch, 1855)

Species of fly

Rhagoletis tabellaria is a species of tephritid or fruit fly in the genus Rhagoletis of the family Tephritidae. Its primary host plant is Cornus sericea. It is parasitized by the wasp Utetes tabellariae.
