= Rhagoletis psalida =

Scientific classification
- Kingdom: Animalia
- Phylum: Arthropoda
- Class: Insecta
- Order: Diptera
- Family: Tephritidae
- Genus: Rhagoletis
- Species: R. psalida

Binomial name
- Rhagoletis psalida Hendel, 1914

Species of fly

Rhagoletis psalida is a species of tephritid or fruit flies in the genus Rhagoletis of the family Tephritidae.
