= Rhagoletis samojlovitshae =

Scientific classification
- Kingdom: Animalia
- Phylum: Arthropoda
- Class: Insecta
- Order: Diptera
- Family: Tephritidae
- Genus: Rhagoletis
- Species: R. samojlovitshae

Binomial name
- Rhagoletis samojlovitshae (Rohdendorf, 1961)

Species of fly

Rhagoletis samojlovitshae is a species of tephritid or fruit flies in the genus Rhagoletis of the family Tephritidae.
