= Rhagoletis ochraspis =

Scientific classification
- Domain: Eukaryota
- Kingdom: Animalia
- Phylum: Arthropoda
- Class: Insecta
- Order: Diptera
- Family: Tephritidae
- Genus: Rhagoletis
- Species: R. ochraspis

Binomial name
- Rhagoletis ochraspis (Wiedemann, 1830)

Species of fly

Rhagoletis ochraspis is a species of tephritid or fruit fly in the genus Rhagoletis of the family Tephritidae.

The species was classified as Ortalis ochraspis by Christian Rudolph Wilhelm Wiedemann in 1830. It was reclassified to the current accepted name in 1968 by D. Elmo Hardy.
