= Matsumurania =

Scientific classification
- Kingdom: Animalia
- Phylum: Arthropoda
- Clade: Pancrustacea
- Class: Insecta
- Order: Diptera
- Family: Tephritidae
- Subfamily: Phytalmiinae
- Tribe: Phytalmiini
- Genus: Matsumurania; Shiraki, 1933
- Species: M. sapporensis

Binomial name
- Matsumurania sapporensis (Matsumura, 1916)

Synonyms
- Rhagoletis sapporensis Matsumura, 1916

Genus of flies

Matsumurania is a genus of tephritid or fruit flies in the family Tephritidae. The only species in this genus is Matsumurania sapporensis.
