= Rhagoletis conversa =

Scientific classification
- Domain: Eukaryota
- Kingdom: Animalia
- Phylum: Arthropoda
- Class: Insecta
- Order: Diptera
- Family: Tephritidae
- Genus: Rhagoletis
- Species: R. conversa

Binomial name
- Rhagoletis conversa (Brèthes, 1919)

Species of fly

Rhagoletis conversa is a species of tephritid or fruit flies in the genus Rhagoletis of the family Tephritidae.
