= Rhagoletis juniperina =

Scientific classification
- Kingdom: Animalia
- Phylum: Arthropoda
- Class: Insecta
- Order: Diptera
- Family: Tephritidae
- Genus: Rhagoletis
- Species: R. juniperina

Binomial name
- Rhagoletis juniperina Marcovitch, 1915

Synonyms
- Rhagoletos juniperinus Marcovitch, 1915

Species of fly

Rhagoletis juniperina is a species of tephritid or fruit flies in the genus Rhagoletis of the family Tephritidae.
