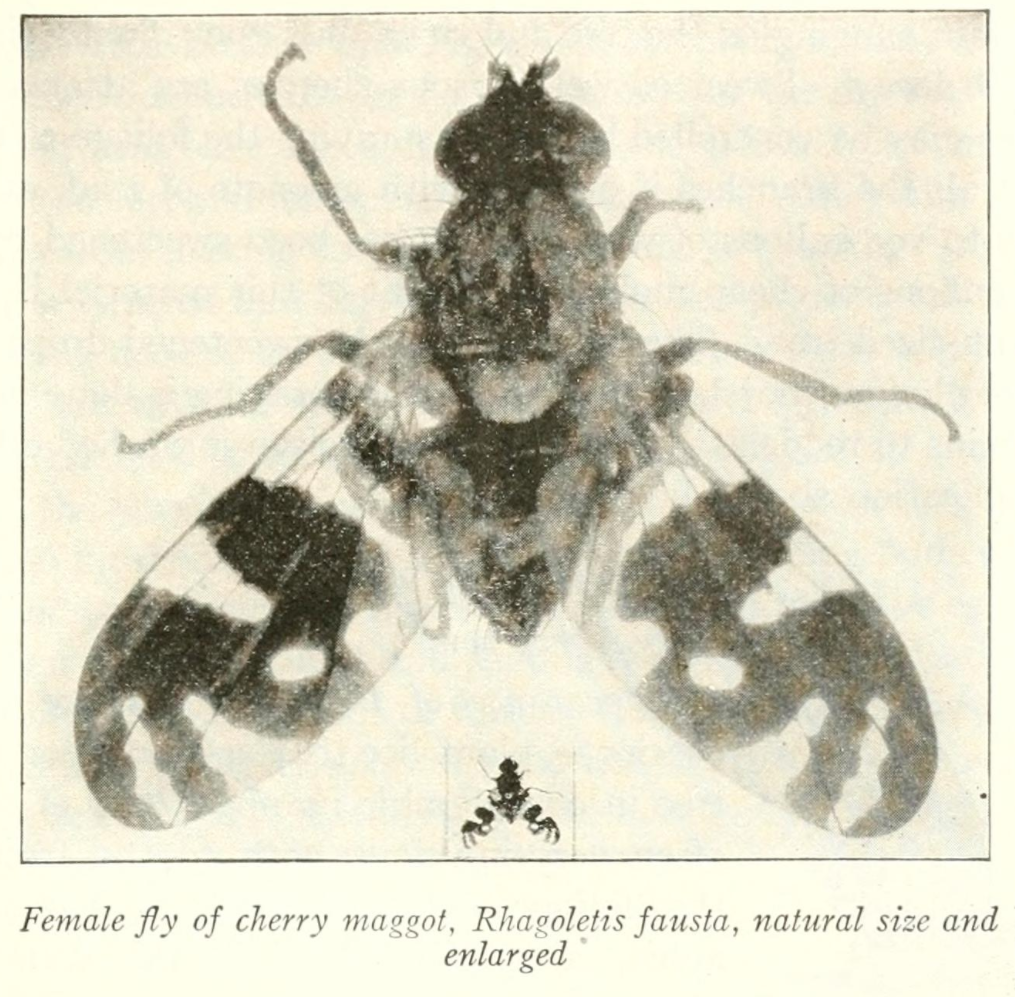

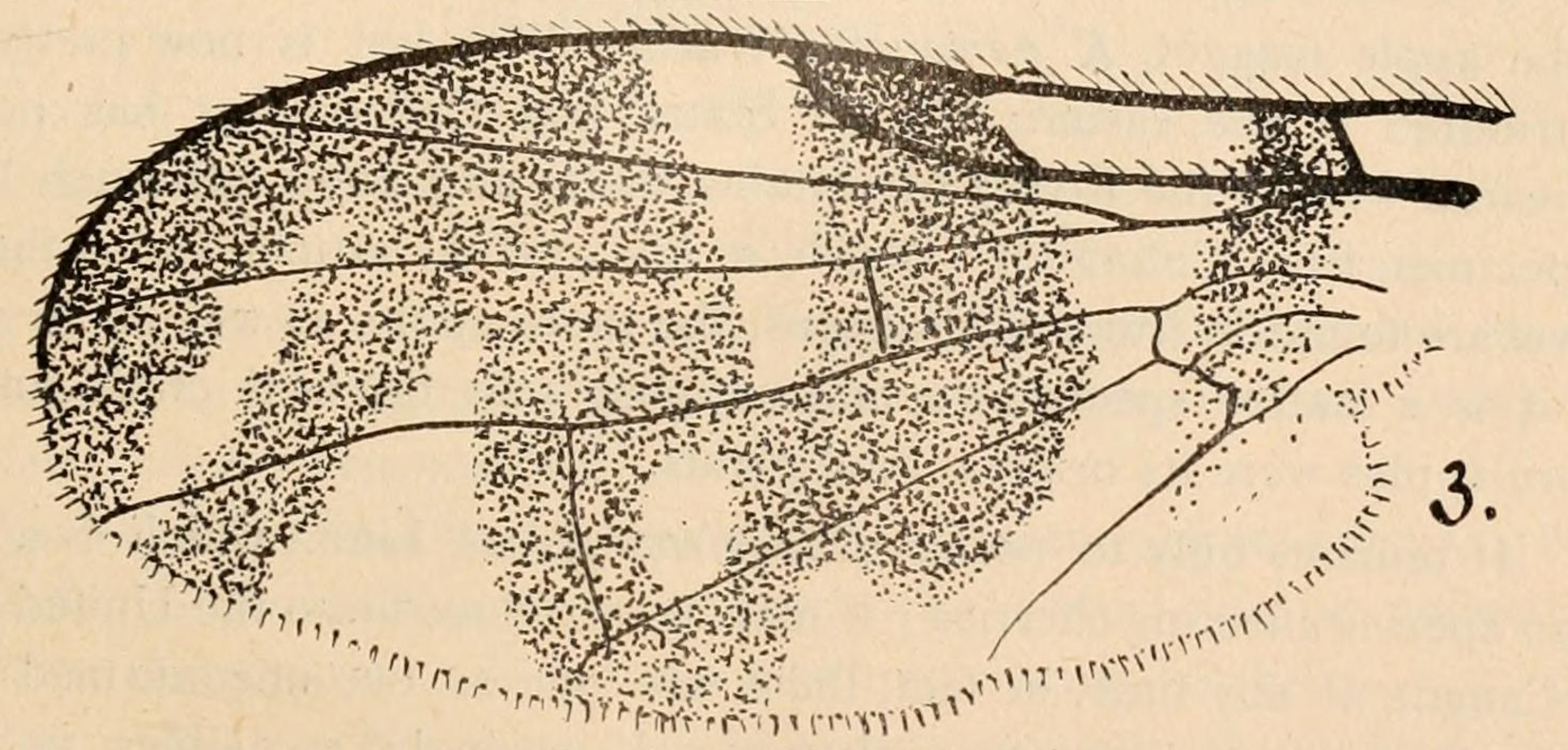

Scientific classification
- Domain: Eukaryota
- Kingdom: Animalia
- Phylum: Arthropoda
- Class: Insecta
- Order: Diptera
- Family: Tephritidae
- Genus: Rhagoletis
- Species: R. fausta

Binomial name
- Rhagoletis fausta (Osten Sacken, 1877)

Synonyms
- Trypeta (Acidia) fausta Osten Sacken, 1877; Rhagoletis intrudens Aldrich, 1909

= Rhagoletis fausta =

Species of fly

Rhagoletis fausta, the black-bodied cherry fruit fly, is a species of tephritid or fruit flies in the genus Rhagoletis of the family Tephritidae. It is found in the United States and Canada.

== Taxonomic history ==
It was initially described by Carl Robert Osten-Sacken in 1877. who classified it in the Acidia subgenus (now its own genus) of the genus Trypeta. In 1899, Daniel William Coquillett transferred the species to its present genus, Rhagoletis. John Merton Aldrich described its junior synonym R. intrudens in 1909. Aldrich himself synonymized the two the following year.
