= Rhagoletis rohdendorfi =

Scientific classification
- Domain: Eukaryota
- Kingdom: Animalia
- Phylum: Arthropoda
- Class: Insecta
- Order: Diptera
- Family: Tephritidae
- Genus: Rhagoletis
- Species: R. rohdendorfi

Binomial name
- Rhagoletis rohdendorfi Korneyev & Merz, 1997

Species of fly

Rhagoletis rohdendorfi is a species of fruit fly in the genus Rhagoletis of the family Tephritidae.
