= Urophora caurina =

Scientific classification
- Kingdom: Animalia
- Phylum: Arthropoda
- Class: Insecta
- Order: Diptera
- Family: Tephritidae
- Subfamily: Tephritinae
- Tribe: Myopitini
- Genus: Urophora
- Species: U. caurina

Binomial name
- Urophora caurina (Doane, 1899)

Synonyms
- Rhagoletis caurina Doane, 1899

Species of fly

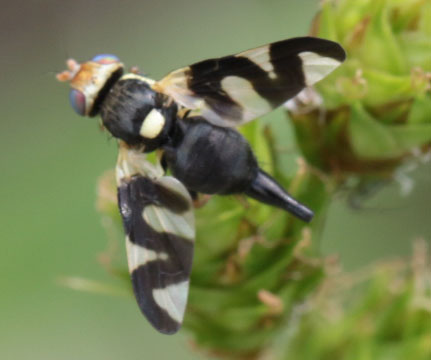
A picture of Urophora caurina.

Urophora caurina is a species of tephritid or fruit flies in the genus Urophora of the family Tephritidae.

== Distribution ==
United States.
