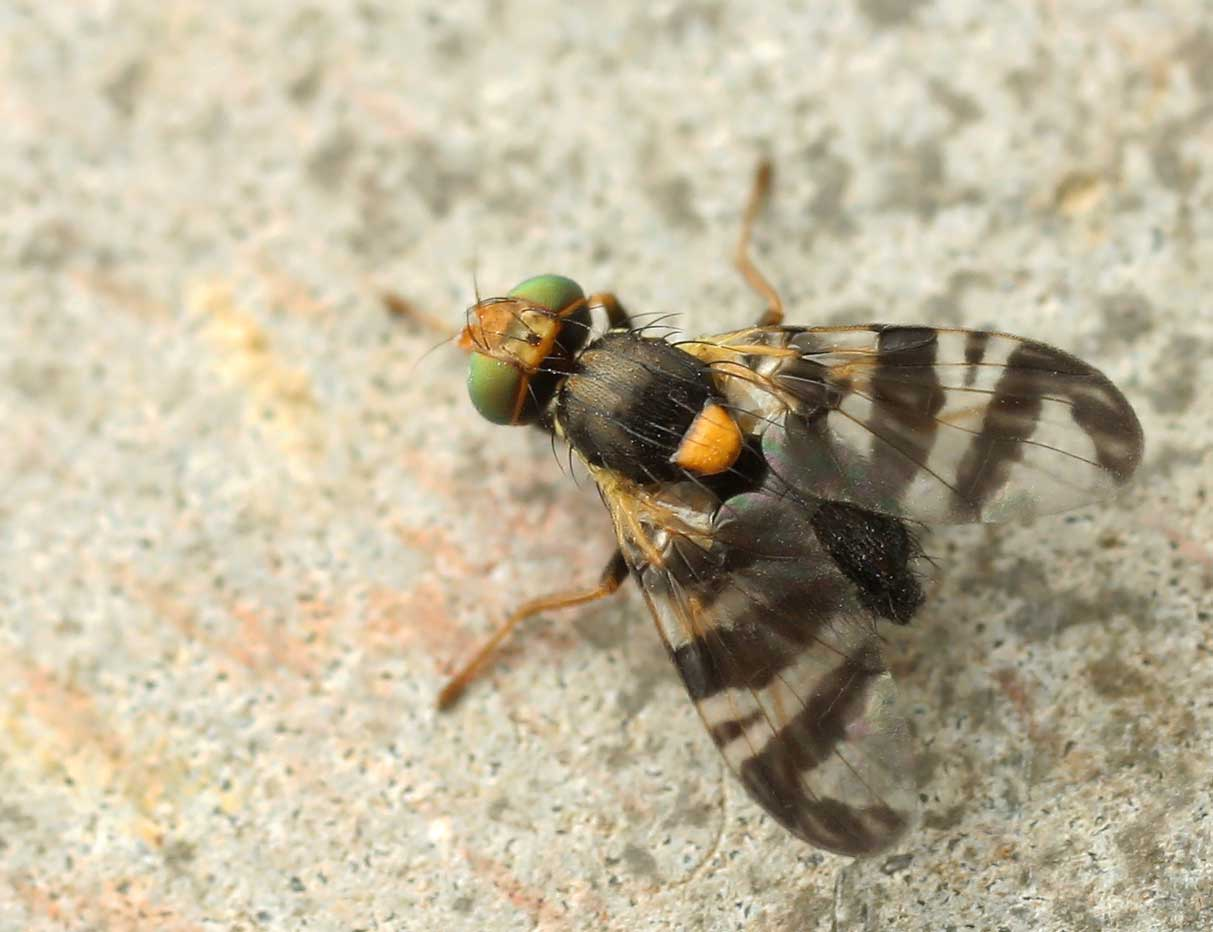

Scientific classification
- Kingdom: Animalia
- Phylum: Arthropoda
- Class: Insecta
- Order: Diptera
- Family: Tephritidae
- Genus: Rhagoletis
- Species: R. cerasi

Binomial name
- Rhagoletis cerasi (Linnaeus, 1758)

Synonyms
- List: Musca cerasi Linnaeus, 1758; Rhagoletis fasciata Rohdendorf, 1961; Rhagoletis nigripes Rohdendorf, 1961; Rhagoletis obsoleta Hering, 1936; Rhagoletis signata (Meigen, 1826); Tephritis ceraci Persson, 1958; Trypeta signata Meigen, 1826; Urophora cerasorum Dufour, 1845; Urophora liturata Robineau-Desvoidy, 1830

= Rhagoletis cerasi =

Species of fly

Rhagoletis cerasi (the cherry fruit fly or European cherry fruit fly) is a species of fruit fly in the family Tephritidae.

== Distribution ==
This species is widespread in most of Europe, except British Islands, in western Siberia to Caucasus, in Kazakhstan, Central Asia and Altai. It was first detected in North America in 2016.

== Description ==
Rhagoletis cerasi can reach a body length of about 3.5–5 mm (0.14–0.20 in). These small fruit flies have a shiny body, dark brown, almost black. Mesonotum shows silvery vittae. The wings are transparent, with four transverse dark stripes. Eyes are green with reddish reflections. The head is brown, while scutellum and the legs are yellow.

This species is very similar to Rhagoletis berberidis.

== Biology ==
The adults can be found from late May to early July. They feed on the sugary secretions produced by the cherry itself or by insects (such as the aphid honeydew). After 10–15 days the females lay 50-80 eggs one at a time in the pulp of the fruit. After 6–12 days the eggs hatch and white legless larvae 4–6 mm long come out and feed on the pulp of the fruit. During the ripening the larvae leave the fruit and pupate in the soil, where they overwinter. Usually this species have one generation every 1–2 years.

These fruit flies are considered a major pest of cherry crops in Europe and Asia. They damage also the fruits of apricot, honeysuckle, barberry, bird cherry and snowberry.

== Gallery ==
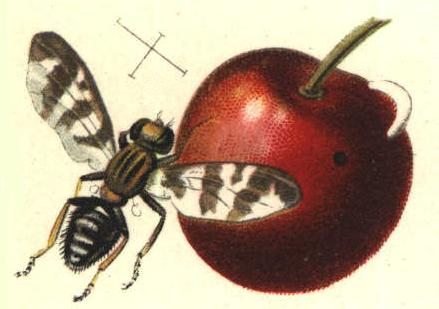
Drawing of cherry fruit fly

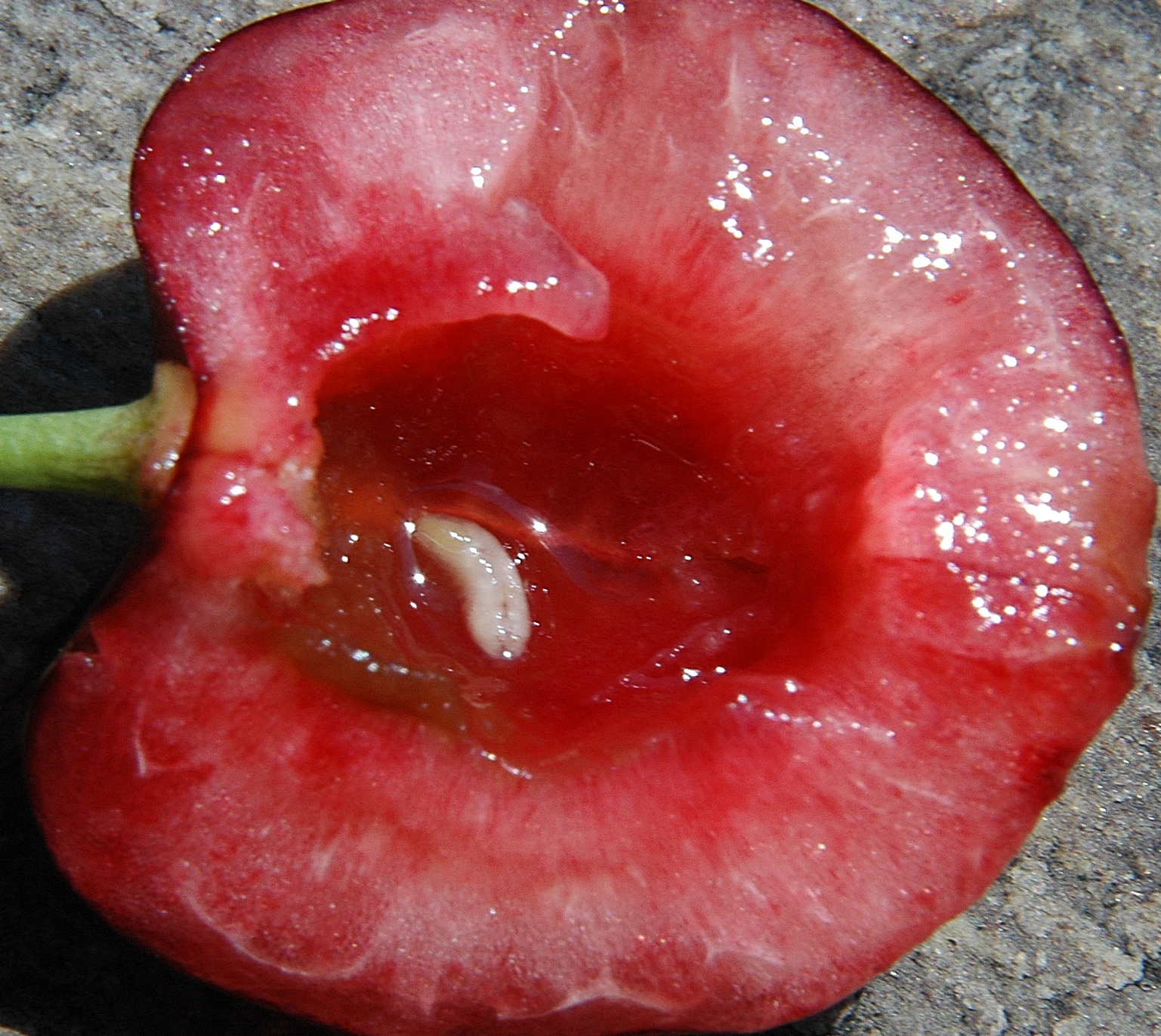
Larva in a cherry fruit

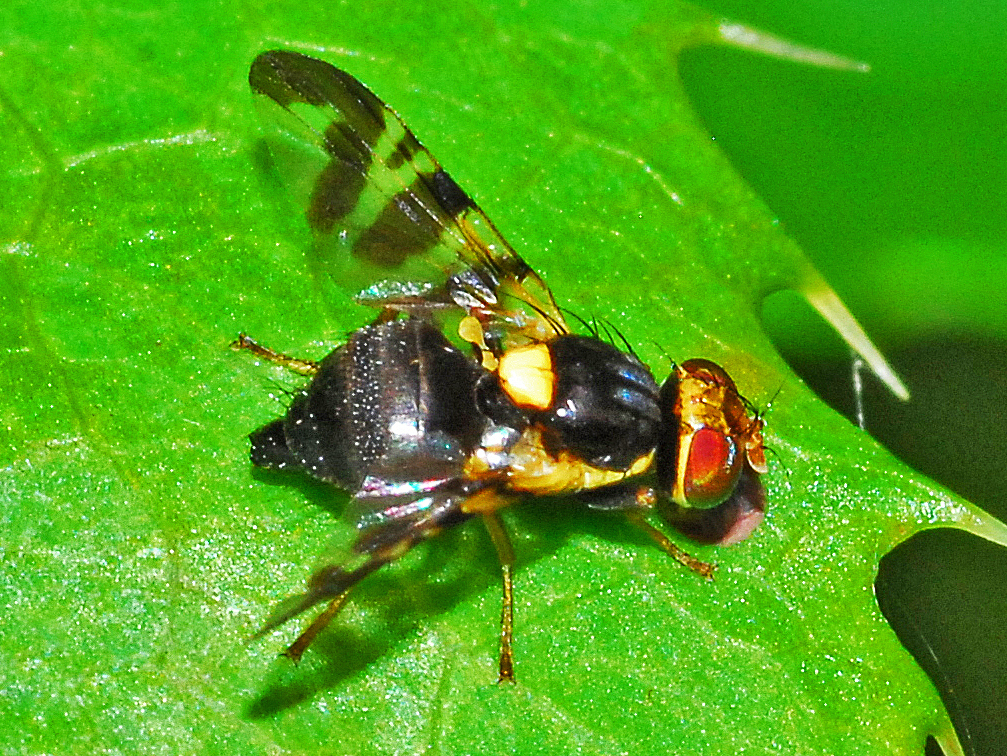
Image

Video clip

== Bibliography ==
- Luigi Masutti, Sergio Zangheri, Entomologia generale e applicata, Padova, CEDAM, 2001, p. 745-746, ISBN 88-13-23135-0. (in Italian)
- Mario Ferrari, Elena Marcon; Andrea Menta, Fitopatologia, Entomologia agraria e biologia applicata, 3rd ed., Bologna, Calderini Edagricole, 2000, ISBN 88-206-4159-3. (in Italian)
