= Rhagoletis indifferens =

Scientific classification
- Domain: Eukaryota
- Kingdom: Animalia
- Phylum: Arthropoda
- Class: Insecta
- Order: Diptera
- Family: Tephritidae
- Genus: Rhagoletis
- Species: R. indifferens

Binomial name
- Rhagoletis indifferens Curran, 1932

Synonyms
- Rhagoletis cingulata subsp. indifferens Curran

Species of fly

Rhagoletis indifferens, the western cherry fruit fly, is a pest that lives only on cherries. Its native host is Prunus emarginata. The adult form of this insect is slightly smaller than a housefly, with white stripes across the abdomen, yellow markings near the base of the wings, and black markings on the wings. The larva, which is the stage of this insect's lifecycle that causes the actual damage to the fruit, is similar to a typical fly larva or maggot. Female flies lay eggs in the cherries, where the larvae feed for 1–2 weeks before exiting. Western cherry fruit flies damage fruit by feeding, in both the adult and larval stages.

== Distribution ==
This species is found in southeastern British Columbia in Canada, and Arizona, California, Colorado, Idaho, Montana, New Mexico, Oregon, Utah, Washington, and Wyoming in the United States. It has been introduced to Switzerland. Climate change is likely to reduce populations, as the species requires a winter diapause.
