= Rhagoletis flavicincta =

Scientific classification
- Kingdom: Animalia
- Phylum: Arthropoda
- Class: Insecta
- Order: Diptera
- Family: Tephritidae
- Genus: Rhagoletis
- Species: R. flavicincta

Binomial name
- Rhagoletis flavicincta Enderlein, 1934

Species of fly

Rhagoletis flavicincta is a species of tephritid or fruit flies of the family Tephritidae found in Eastern Europe and Asia.
