= Rhagoletis blanchardi =

Scientific classification
- Kingdom: Animalia
- Phylum: Arthropoda
- Clade: Pancrustacea
- Class: Insecta
- Order: Diptera
- Family: Tephritidae
- Genus: Rhagoletis
- Species: R. blanchardi

Binomial name
- Rhagoletis blanchardi Aczel, 1954

Species of fly

Rhagoletis blanchardi is a species of tephritid or fruit flies in the genus Rhagoletis of the family Tephritidae.
