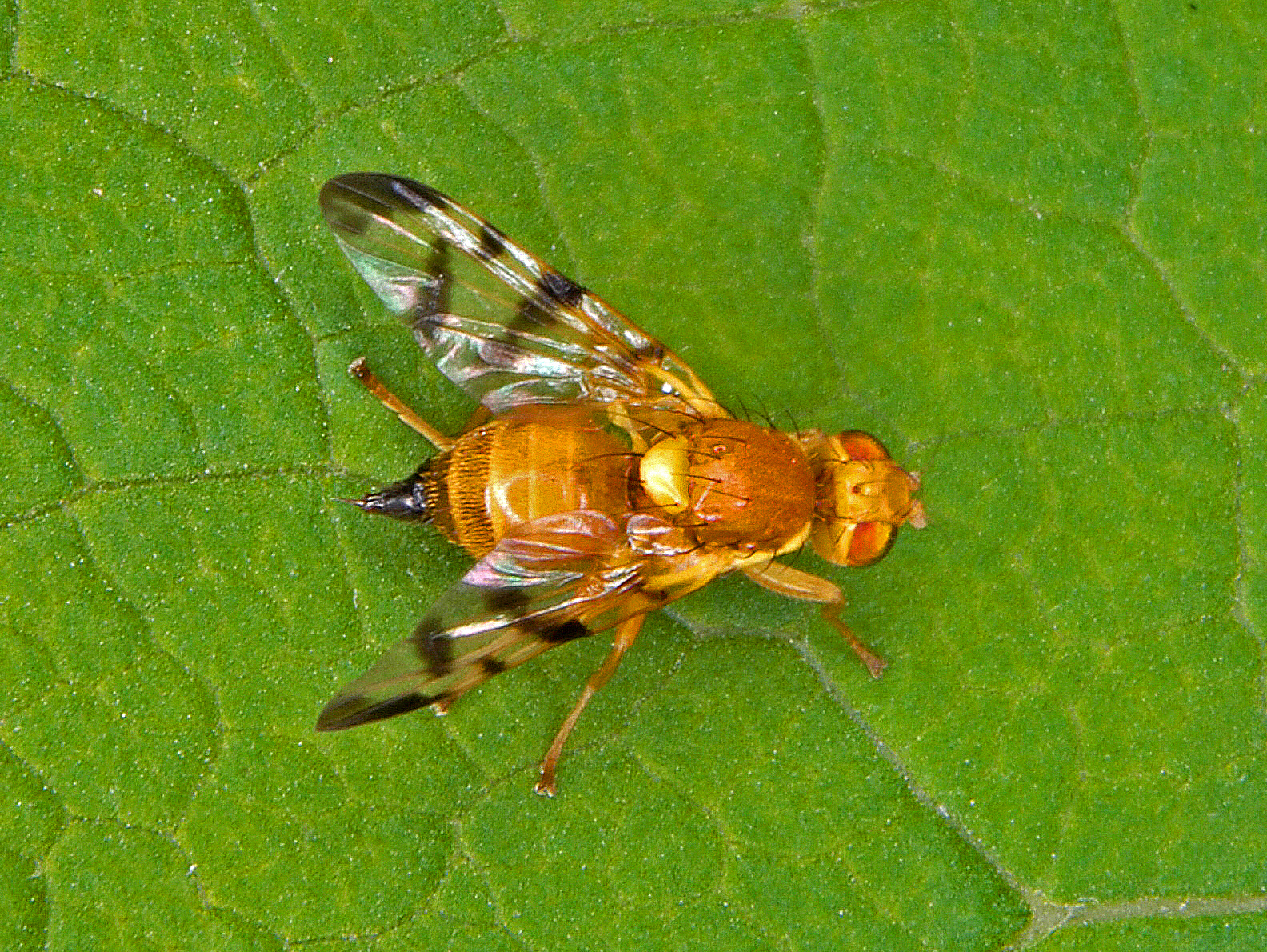
- Female of Rhagoletis meigenii. Dorsal view
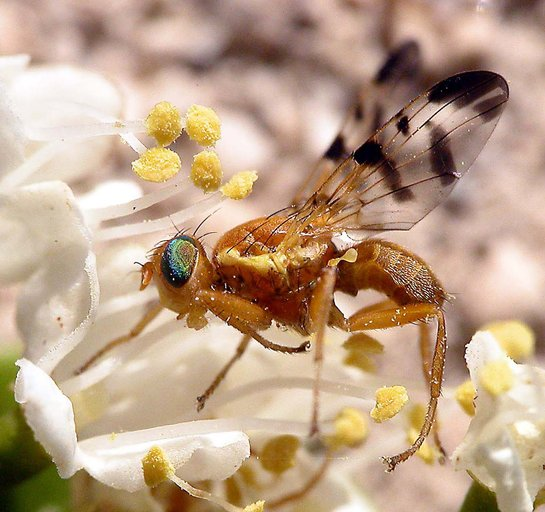
- Male. Side view

Scientific classification
- Kingdom: Animalia
- Phylum: Arthropoda
- Class: Insecta
- Order: Diptera
- Family: Tephritidae
- Genus: Rhagoletis
- Species: R. meigenii

Binomial name
- Rhagoletis meigenii (Loew, 1844)

Synonyms
- Trypeta meigenii Loew, 1844; Tephritis vicina Macquart, 1835; Zonosema meigeni Becker, 1905

= Rhagoletis meigenii =

Species of fly

Rhagoletis meigenii, common name barberry fly or yellow berberis fruit fly, is a species of tephritid or fruit flies in the genus Rhagoletis of the family Tephritidae.

== Distribution ==
This species is present in most of Europe (Austria, Belgium, Czech Republic, Denmark, Estonia, Finland, France, Germany, Hungary, Italy, Latvia, Lithuania, Norway, Poland, Slovakia, Spain, Sweden, Switzerland, The Netherlands, Ukraine, and United Kingdom), in the Near East and in Central Asia. It has been introduced in the Nearctic realm, in Canada (Nova Scotia) and in USA (Maine, New Hampshire).

== Description ==
Rhagoletis meigenii can reach a body length of about 8–10 millimetres (0.31–0.39 in). These flies are characterized by prominent banded wings. These dark bands include an apical crossband, a preapical crossband and a discal crossband. Also the accessory costal crossband is present. The head has two pairs of orbital setae. Scutellum is usually entirely cream to yellow. The background color of the body is orange-yellow.

== Biology ==
Adults can be seen from July to August. They feed on pollen and nectar, where as larvae feed on fruit seeds of their preferred host plant (Berberis vulgaris).

== Bibliography ==
- The Fruit Flies (Tephritidae) of Ontario
- Mason P.G., Huber J.T. (Eds.). 2002 - Biological control programmes in Canada, 1981-2000 - CABI, Technology & Engineering. 583 pp.
- Thompson, F. C. & Vockeroth, J. R. (May 27, 2007). 66. Family Tephritidae". Australasian/Oceanian Diptera Catalog – Web Version.
