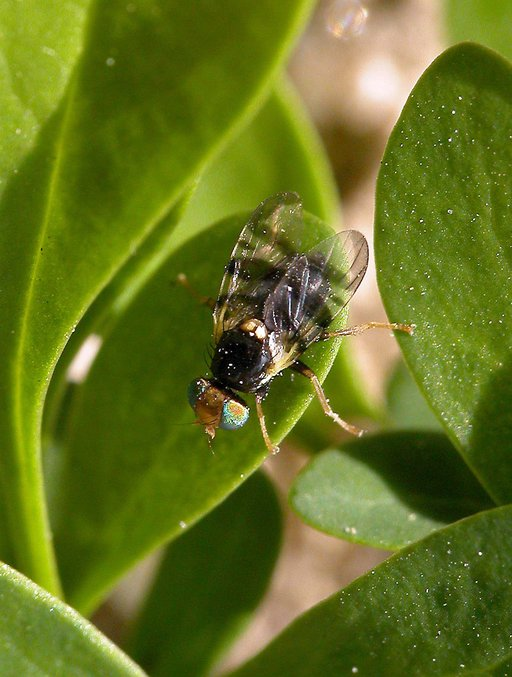

Scientific classification
- Kingdom: Animalia
- Phylum: Arthropoda
- Class: Insecta
- Order: Diptera
- Family: Tephritidae
- Genus: Rhagoletis
- Species: R. berberidis

Binomial name
- Rhagoletis berberidis Jermy, 1961

= Rhagoletis berberidis =

Species of fly

Rhagoletis berberidis is an insect species of tephritid or fruit flies in the genus Rhagoletis of the family Tephritidae.
