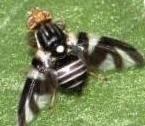

Scientific classification
- Domain: Eukaryota
- Kingdom: Animalia
- Phylum: Arthropoda
- Class: Insecta
- Order: Diptera
- Family: Tephritidae
- Genus: Rhagoletis
- Species: R. zephyria

Binomial name
- Rhagoletis zephyria Snow, 1894

Synonyms
- Rhagoletis symphoricarpi Curran, 1924; Rhagoletis zephrina Woodworth, 1913

= Rhagoletis zephyria =

Species of fly

Rhagoletis zephyria is a species of tephritid or fruit fly in the genus Rhagoletis of the family Tephritidae. Visually similar to Rhagoletis pomonella and often misidentified as such.
