= Phytosanitary =

Phytosanitary may refer to:

- Phytosanitary certification
- Phytosanitary inspection
- Phytosanitary irradiation
- Phytosanitary quarantine
- Sanitary and phytosanitary measures and agreements
  - Phytosanitary regulation
  - Agreement on the Application of Sanitary and Phytosanitary Measures of the WTO Uruguay Round
  - Risk Assessment under the Sanitary and Phytosanitary Agreement
  - Phytosanitary Certificate Issuance and Tracking System of the USDA
  - Commission on Phytosanitary Measures of the FAO IPPC
  - International Standards For Phytosanitary Measures No. 15 of the IPPC
