= European and Mediterranean Plant Protection Organization =

Intergovernmental organisation based in Paris

- Formation: April 18, 1951; 75 years ago
- Location: Paris, France
- Acting Director-General: Nico Horn
- Website: www.eppo.int

The European and Mediterranean Plant Protection Organization (EPPO) is an intergovernmental organisation responsible for European cooperation in plant protection in the European and Mediterranean region. Founded on April 18, 1951 and based in Paris, France, EPPO is the Regional Plant Protection Organization (RPPO) for Europe under the International Plant Protection Convention (IPPC).

To meet its objectives to protect plants, strategize against the introduction and spread of dangerous pests, and to promote safe and effective control methods, EPPO develops international standards and recommendations, provides reporting services, participates in global discussions on plant health, EPPO hold regular expert working groups, and maintained EPPO codes.

== History ==
Founded in 1951 and based in Paris, France, EPPO is the Regional Plant Protection Organization (RPPO) for Europe under the International Plant Protection Convention (IPPC). The intergovernmental organisation responsible for European cooperation in plant protection in the European and Mediterranean region had grown to 52 member states as of 2020. EPPO's objectives are to protect plants, to develop international strategies against the introduction and spread of dangerous pests, and to promote safe and effective control methods.

EPPO has developed international standards and recommendations on phytosanitary measures, good plant protection practice, and on the assessment of plant protection products (pesticides). It also provides a reporting service of events of phytosanitary concern such as outbreaks and new pest records. EPPO maintain datasheets on pests of regulatory concern. As a Regional Plant Protection Organization, EPPO also participates in global discussions on plant health organised by FAO and the IPPC Secretariat. EPPO holds expert working groups to perform pest risk analyses on plant pests of concern to the EPPO region.

== EPPO codes ==
EPPO is responsible for management of the EPPO code system, previously known as Bayer codes. The system is an encoded identifier used by EPPO, in a system designed to uniquely identify organisms that are important to agriculture and crop protection.

== EPPO member countries ==
As of February 2021:

Albania
Algeria
Austria
Azerbaijan
Belarus
Belgium
Bosnia and Herzegovina
Bulgaria
Croatia
Cyprus
Czech Republic
Denmark
Estonia
Finland
France
Georgia
Germany
Greece

Guernsey
Hungary
Ireland
Israel (PPIS)
Italy
Jersey
Jordan
Kazakhstan
Kyrgyzstan
Latvia
Lithuania
Luxembourg
Malta
Moldova
Montenegro
Morocco
Netherlands
North Macedonia

Norway
Poland
Portugal
Romania
Russia
Serbia
Slovakia
Slovenia
Spain
Sweden
Switzerland
Tunisia
Turkey
Ukraine
United Kingdom
Uzbekistan

== EPPO Bulletin ==
The EPPO Bulletin is the official publication of EPPO. It features articles on all aspects of plant protection and is published on behalf of EPPO by Wiley-Blackwell. Articles are published in French or English with a Russian summary.
