= European Food Safety Authority =

Agency of the European Union

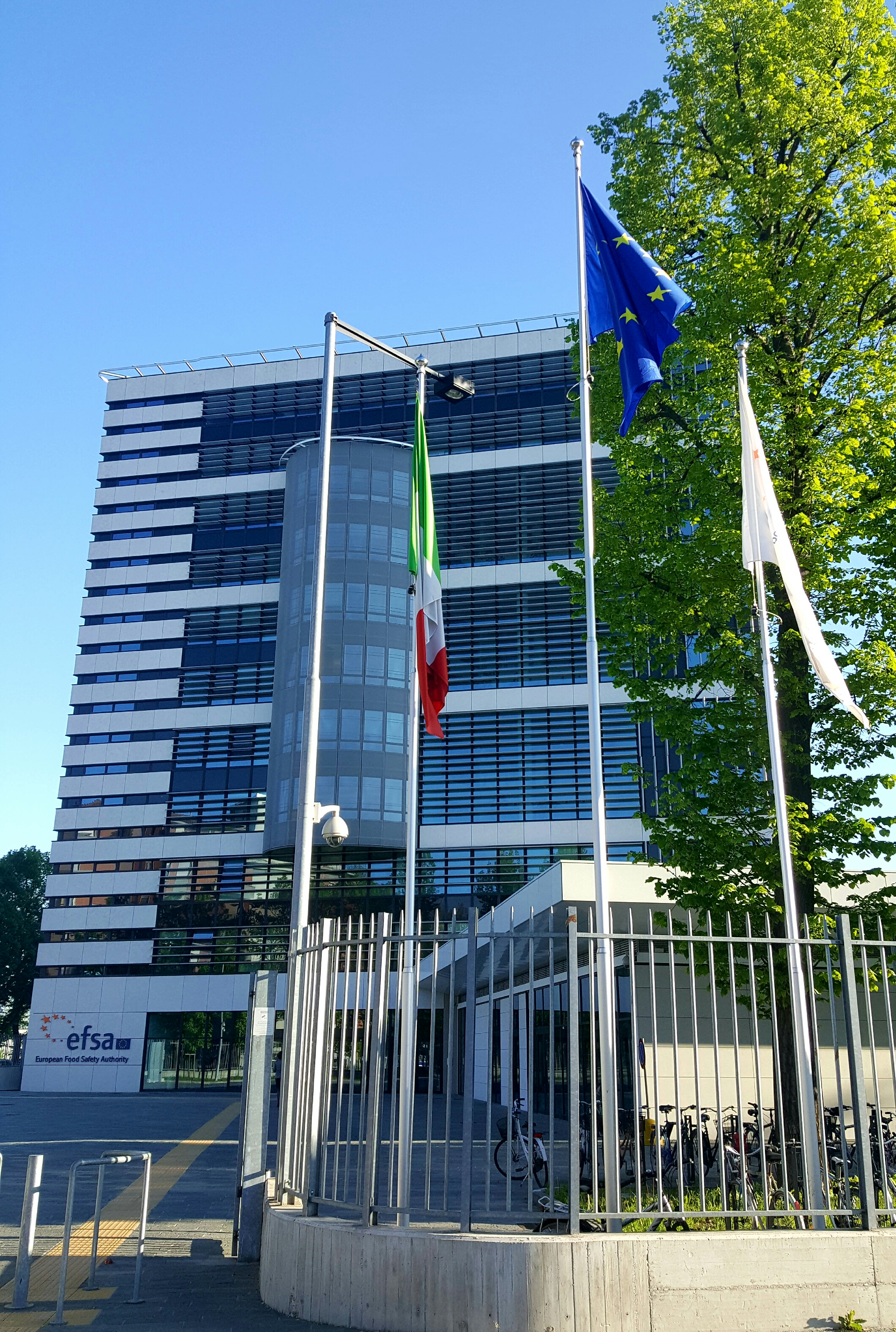
- Headquarters in Parma

Authority overview
- Formed: 21 February 2002
- Jurisdiction: European Union
- Headquarters: Parma, Italy
- Motto: Committed to ensuring that Europe's food is safe
- Authority executive: Nikolaus Kriz, Executive Director
- Key document: Regulation (EC) No 178/2002
- Website: www.efsa.europa.eu

Map
- European Food Safety Authority (European Union)

The European Food Safety Authority (EFSA) is the agency of the European Union (EU) that provides independent scientific advice and communicates on existing and emerging risks associated with the food chain. EFSA was established in February 2002 in Parma, Italy. It had a yearly budget of €118.6 million, and a total staff of 542 as of 2021.

The work of EFSA covers all matters with a direct or indirect impact on food and feed safety, including animal health and welfare, plant protection and plant health and nutrition. EFSA supports the European Commission, the European Parliament and EU member states in taking effective and timely risk management decisions that ensure the protection of the health of European consumers and the safety of the food and feed chain. EFSA also communicates to the public in an open and transparent way on all matters within its remit.

== Structure ==
Based on a regulation of 2002, the EFSA is composed of four bodies:

- Management Board
- Executive Director
- Advisory Forum
- Scientific Committee and Scientific Panels

The Management Board sets the budget, approves work programmes, and is responsible for ensuring that EFSA co-operates successfully with partner organisations across the EU and beyond. It is composed of fourteen members appointed by the Council of the European Union in consultation with the European Parliament from a list drawn up by the European Commission, plus one representative of the European Commission.

The Executive Director is EFSA's legal representative and is responsible for day-to-day administration, drafting and implementing work programmes, and implementing other decisions adopted by the Management Board. They are appointed by the Management Board.

The Advisory Forum advises the Executive Director, in particular in drafting a proposal for the EFSA's work programmes. It is composed of representatives of national bodies responsible for risk assessment in the Member States, with observers from Norway, Iceland, Switzerland and the European Commission.

The Scientific Committee and its Scientific Panels provide scientific opinions and advice, each within their own sphere of competence, and are composed of independent scientific experts. The number and names of the Scientific Panels are adapted in the light of technical and scientific development by the European Commission at EFSA's request. The independent scientific experts are appointed by the Management Board upon a proposal from the Executive Director for three-year terms.

== Public transparency ==
Public transparency is the practice of informing citizens of all governmental action, and providing public access to government documents. It enables democratic accountability, meaning that citizens can hold the government accountable for doing its job to protect them. Transparency increases citizens' trust in the government and keeps them well-informed.

=== Importance ===
Transparency is a fundamental value in the European Union, as stated in the Treaty on the Functioning of the European Union (TFEU). The European Commission declares that all European Union citizens/residents have the freedom of information, which entitles them to have access to all governmental documents from the European Commission, European Parliament, and European Council. Since the EFSA is an independent agency but overseen by representatives of the European Commission and Council of the European Union, the EFSA must abide by the transparency policy.

According to author Blánaid Ní Chearnaigh, prior to 2018, only some EFSA documents were accessible to the public, such as risk assessments for specific chemicals. These risk assessments were detailed scientific reports that analyzed chemicals' safety levels and potential risk for causing harm, such as cancer. They were difficult to understand and poorly formatted, which frustrated consumers. She articulates that during a "public consultation on transparency in relation to risk assessments conducted by EFSA," it was evident that consumers wanted enhanced public access "to EFSA evaluations and documents." Chearnaigh concludes that the public's demands for direct transparency from the EFSA resulted in the creation of Regulation (EU) No. 2019/1381. This legal document outlines the importance of inclusive communication regarding chemical risk assessment to all parties involved: both government bodies and citizens. Residents of the European Union want to feel confident that their government will protect them from all potential health hazards and prioritize consumers' needs, and through transparency, the EFSA can provide that confidence.

=== Applications ===
==== Chemical safety information ====
As stated by Hanna Schebesta and Kai Purnhagen, the authors of EU Food Law, the EFSA contributes to a public Food Additives list posted by the European Commission that catalogs all food-related chemicals and relevant information for each of them. This additional information includes specific conditions for use, food items the chemical may be found in, and restrictions on the amount that can be used.

==== Food packaging and advertisements ====
Transparency also applies to how food is presented to consumers, such as through packaging and advertisements. The EFSA works alongside the Food Information to Consumers Regulation (FICR), a separate agency, to enforce that all food information given to the public is easy to understand, and more importantly, accurate. Although the FICR handles more of the legislative side of these transparency policies, the EFSA is consulted because the overall public health is involved. Both the EFSA and FICR ensure that all packaging of food available in the European Union includes the following aspects: an ingredient list and the amount of specific ingredients, food name, the date, allergens, total quantity, place of origin, food business operator information, nutrition information, alcoholic content (if applicable), and directions for how to store and use the item.

== Focal Point network ==
The EFSA cooperates with the national food safety authorities of the 27 EU member states, Iceland and Norway, as well as observers from Switzerland and EU candidate countries, through its Focal Points, who also communicate with research institutes and other stakeholders. They "assist in the exchange of scientific information and experts, advise on cooperation activities and scientific projects, promote training in risk assessment and raise EFSA's scientific visibility and outreach in Member States."

=== Members ===
The following countries' national food safety authorities are members of the EFSA Focal Point network:

Country	Food safety authority
Austria	Austrian Agency for Health and Food Safety (AGES)
Belgium	Federal Public Service (FPS) Health Food Chain Safety and Environment
Bulgaria	Risk Assessment Center on Food Chain – Bulgarian Food Safety Agency
Croatia	Croatian Food Agency (HAH)
Cyprus	Ministry of Health – The State General Laboratory
Czech Republic	Czech Agriculture and Food Inspection Authority (SZPI, CAFIA)
Denmark	National Food Institute
Estonia	Ministry of Agriculture – Food Safety Department
Finland	Finnish Food Authority (Ruokavirasto)
France	French Agency for Food, Environmental and Occupational Health Safety (ANSES)
Germany	Federal Institute for Risk Assessment (BfR)
Greece	Hellenic Food Authority (ΕΦΕΤ, EFET)
Hungary	National Food Chain Safety Office (Nébih/NFCSO)
Iceland	The Icelandic Food and Veterinary Authority (MAST)
Ireland	Food Safety Authority of Ireland (FSAI)
Italy	Istituto Superiore di Sanità (ISS)
Latvia	Institute of Food Safety, Animal Health and Environment "BIOR"
Lithuania	State Food and Veterinary Service
Luxembourg	Ministry of Agriculture, Ministry of Health
Malta	Malta Competition and Consumer Affairs Authority
Netherlands	Netherlands Food and Consumer Product Safety Authority (NVWA)
Norway	Norwegian Scientific Committee for Food and Environment (VKM)
Poland	State Sanitary Inspection (PIS) – primary focal point; Veterinary Inspection (IW) – accessory focal point
Portugal	Economic and Food Safety Authority (ASAE)
Romania	National Sanitary Veterinary and Food Safety Authority
Slovakia	Ministry of Agriculture and Rural Development
Slovenia	Ministry of Agriculture, Forestry and Food
Spain	Spanish Agency for Food Safety and Nutrition (AESAN)
Sweden	Swedish National Food Agency

=== Observers ===
The following countries' national food safety authorities are observers of the EFSA Focal Point network:

Country	Food safety authority
Albania	National Food Authority
Bosnia and Herzegovina	Food Safety Agency of Bosnia and Herzegovina
Kosovo	Food and Veterinary Agency
Montenegro	Administration for Food Safety, Veterinary, and Phytosanitary Affairs
North Macedonia	Food and Veterinary Agency
Serbia	Ministry of Agriculture and Environmental Protection
Switzerland	Food Safety and Veterinary Office (FSVO) – Risk assessment division
Turkey	Ministry of Agriculture and Forestry

== Specific examples ==
The EFSA is responsible for maintaining the safety of all food-related items to ensure the public health of all European Union residents and citizens. This includes meat processing, pesticide residue, vitamins, and other supplements.

=== Sports Food Supplements ===
Any substance used to benefit an athletic performance or fitness goal is considered a sports food supplement, also known as an ergogenic aid. Some popular examples of sports food supplements include protein powder/bars, creatine, and electrolyte beverages. Similar to the established food laws, the European Union has laws in place to ensure that sports supplements do not mislead consumers with false information. In an analytical assessment article, it states that supplement labels and advertisements often make false health claims, and about 70% of athletes are heavily influenced by the advertised benefits. In other words, manufacturers advertise gains of using their products, such as increased endurance, knowing that it will increase sales without having any scientific evidence to prove the posted benefits. The EU prevents false health benefit claims through tasking the EFSA with fact-checking advertised health statements, such as a supplement increasing endurance. Both the EFSA and other research organizations "have previously studied the characteristics of the different substances added or isolated in supplements, as well as the safety of their consumption." The EFSA and European Commission then both assess whether advertised statements are true or false based on the EFSA's scientific data.

== Journal ==
The scientific output of the European Food Safety Authority is published in the EFSA Journal, an open-access, online scientific journal. This concerns risk assessment in relation to food and feed and includes nutrition, animal health and welfare, plant health and plant protection.

== Criticism ==
The EFSA has been criticised for its alleged "overregulation".

=== Conflicts of interests ===
The EFSA has been criticised, including by the European Court of Auditors in 2012, for "frequent conflicts of interests", some of them undeclared. A number of undisclosed conflicts of interest involved the International Life Sciences Institute.

According to Corporate Europe Observatory, in 2013, 58% of the experts of the agency were in situation of conflict of interests. In 2017, they were still 46% in situation of conflict of interests.

=== Bisphenol A ===
EFSA has also been criticised by the NGO CHEM Trust for misrepresenting the results of their expert committee's report on bisphenol A (BPA) in January 2015. EFSA claimed in the abstract, press release and briefing that bisphenol A 'posed no risk' to health, when the expert report actually stated the risk was 'low' when considering aggregate exposure (beyond just food). EFSA later modified the abstract to correct this error, though the press release remains unchanged. EFSA have argued that use of 'no health concern' in their press release and bisphenol A briefing is to ensure these materials are accessible, though this rationale is disputed by CHEM Trust.

== See also ==
- Agriculture and Fisheries Council (Council of the European Union)
  - Directorate-General for Agriculture, Fisheries, Social Affairs and Health
- Employment, Social Policy, Health and Consumer Affairs Council (Council of the European Union)
- EU-Eco-regulation
- European Commissioner for Health
  - Directorate-General for Health and Consumers
- European Parliament Committee on the Environment, Public Health and Food Safety
- Health mark
- List of food safety organisations
- Rapid Alert System for Food and Feed
- Regulation of genetically modified organisms in the European Union
- The European Consumer Organisation
