= Central Administration of Plant Quarantine =

- الحجر الزراعي; Alhajar Alziraeiu

Agency overview
- Jurisdiction: Government of Egypt
- Headquarters: 1 Nadi elSaid St., Dokki, Giza, Postal code: 12611, Egypt 6 Dr. Michel Bakhoum St., Dokki, Giza
- Minister responsible: El-Said Marzouq El-Qosair, Agriculture and Land Reclamation
- Agency executive: Dr. Ahmed Kamal El-Attar, Head of Central Administration of Plant Quarantine
- Parent department: Ministry of Agriculture and Land Reclamation
- Website: www.capq.gov.eg

The Central Administration of Plant Quarantine is Egypt's agency for import and export regulation and inspection for plant health. It is an agency of the Ministry of Agriculture and Land Reclamation. CAPQ represents the country to international bodies and treaty organizations such as the International Plant Protection Convention and the Near East Plant Protection Organization (NEPPO), being the National Plant Protection Organization.
