= Invasive species in Puerto Rico =

Invasive species are species that are native to foreign environments which may have important effects on a specific area's economy, ecosystem and infrastructure. These species can be introduced by natural causes or human intervention. There are many invasive species that exist around the world. One that is abundant around Puerto Rico is the lionfish. The United States Department of Agriculture (USDA)'s Animal and Plant Health Inspection Service (APHIS) Plant Protection and Quarantine (PPQ) and Customs and Border Protection (CBP) perform biosecurity inspections for Puerto Rico.

== Mammals ==
- Mongoose: Sugar planters introduced Urva auropunctata, called the "small Indian mongoose", to Puerto Rico in the nineteenth century as a way to control the invasive rat population. Although it was immediately incredibly successful in improving crop yields, they are also responsible for 70% of all rabies cases, albeit that rabies is quite rare, on the island. Note that until recently, the species was believed to be U. javanicus, and most sources still classify the creature under this species. The two taxa are impossible to distinguish without genetic testing. It was introduced in either 1877 or 1887 to the island. It is also believed to prey on the native fauna of the island.
- Pigs: Introduced in the 1500s by the Spanish, now feral in the capital San Juan and elsewhere. United States Department of Agriculture Animal and Plant Health Inspection Service has been attempting - so far unsuccessfully - to eradicate them.
- Rodents: Mus musculus and R. rattus are invasive rodent species in El Yunque National Forest. The latter, the black rat, is believed to be a larger threat because of its wider range. The former, the house mouse, is mainly limited to roadside areas.

== Birds ==
- Columba livia: more commonly known as the rock pigeon, is an invasive bird brought introduced through early European movement throughout the Caribbean. The species typically has a grey body with a white colored rump, but the body color can vary between gray, white, tan, and brown. Throughout history, this animal was bred and used for a multitude of activities including homing and competitive racing. In modern times, they are more commonly utilized as a pastime, where people enjoy feeding and watching them. This particular bird can adapt to live in a variety of environments, including farm yards, grain elevators, feed mills, parks, city buildings, bridges, and more. Rock pigeons have been known to transmit diseases such as salmonella, food poisoning, cryptococcosis, toxoplasmosis, and more. The droppings of rock pigeons can also lead to increased deterioration of building material, causing issues for urban areas within Puerto Rico.

== Reptiles ==
- Although once believed to be native to the island, green iguana may have been introduced to Puerto Rico in the modern era. Green iguanas are native to South and Central America. The species is considered invasive due to the damage it carries out on local agriculture and the threat it poses to native species.
- Boa constrictor: Native to Central and South America, the boa constrictor has recently been observed in Puerto Rico. A small population was found in the city of Mayagüez, where at least 150 boas have been removed. Although recently discovered, it is believed that the population has existed in the area for several decades due to an incidental release.

== Plants ==
- Abrus precatorius: Is a flowering plant better known as "jequirity bean" or "rosary pea" which is notorious for invading warm tropical areas. This nitrogen fixing plant is known to alter soil nutrients and heavily impact native species via allelopathic effects. At the end of the twentieth century, it was declared an invasive weed by Puerto Rico and much of the Caribbean Islands. Once this plant has fully matured, their roots become difficult to remove, adding to this weeds notoriety. The most common removal method was using herbicides such as glyphosate, causing other unintended drawbacks on ecosystems which were invaded. Native species and humans also have to worry about consuming this plant, as it contains toxins which can be detrimental to their health with enough consumption.

== Arthropods ==
The overwhelming majority of arthropods intercepted by border pest inspections came from elsewhere in the Caribbean. Despite a large amount of cargo traffic in both directions, Florida sends more adventive arthropods to PR than the other way around, probably due to laxer biosecurity on the PR side.

=== Insects ===
- Africanized bee: Known to have attacked researchers and certain endangered bird species. First seen on the island in 1994, the honeybee has also inhabited a majority of tree cavities. It has evolved to become a lesser threat to the area over time, although it is still present in the area.
- Aedes aegypti: Also known as the yellow fever mosquito, aides aegypti originated in Africa and is a danger to humans. The mosquito is capable of spreading diseases such as the Zika virus and dengue fever. A distinctive characteristic of the species is its white marks on its leg, and can transported from low to high elevations.
- Hypogeococcus sp.: This invasive mealybug, better known as the Harrisia cactus mealybug, has been assigned its classification for their influence on plant species in Puerto Rican dry forests. Native cacti infected by the bug were observed to have produced fewer fruits and flowers than their healthy counterparts. A higher mortality rate was also seen in certain cactus species, due to Harrisia cactus mealybug.

95% of arthropod border interceptions are insects.

=== Acari ===
Only 4% of arthropod border interceptions are acari.
