= Walther Enkerlin =

Mexican entomologist, advocate

Walther Raúl Enkerlin Hoeflich
- Born: March 24, 1960 (age 66); Monterrey, Mexico
- Education: Instituto Tecnológico y de Estudios Superiores de Monterrey, Imperial College London
- Known for: Entomology, Sterile insect technique, International cooperation
- Awards: Superior Achievement Award awarded by the International Atomic Energy Agency (IAEA)
- Scientific career
- Thesis: Economic Analysis of Management for the Mediterranean Fruit Fly (1997)

Walther Raúl Enkerlin Hoeflich (born March 24, 1960, in Monterrey) is a Mexican entomologist, advocate, and pioneer researcher of the economics of applied sterile insect technique (SIT), currently based at the Joint Food and Agriculture Organization (FOA) and International Atomic Energy Agency (IAEA) Division.

== Career ==
In 1994, Enkerlin was appointed by the national plant protection organization of Mexico as research leader of the project that, in 1997, enabled the opening of the United States market to Hass avocado from Mexico after more than 82 years of quarantine. Today Mexico is the world's number one exporter of Hass avocado, supplying 45% of the international avocado market.

Having worked under the IAEA when it was awarded the 2005 Nobel Peace Prize, he has developed technical standards, policies, and organizational structures to support the implementation of successful SIT programs worldwide, averting devastating economic, social and environmental damage and contributing to food security, food safety and poverty reduction.

In 2008, Enkerlin became the Technical Director of the North American Plant Protection Organization (NAPPO).

Under Enkerlin's directorship, from 2010 to 2015 the Moscamed Programme Commission – the first area-wide and large-scale application of SIT technology against the Mediterranean fruit fly - achieved the greatest advance in pushing the leading edge of the Mediterranean fruit fly infestation away from the Mexican borders, maintaining the Mediterranean fruit fly-free status of Belize, Mexico, and the United States. During that time, he was also appointed by the national plant protection organization of Mexico as the lead technical negotiator of the new Guatemala-Mexico-USA Moscamed Program Cooperative Agreement, which was merged into a single tri-national agreement and ratified in July 2014.

In his current role at the Joint FAO/IAEA Division of the International Atomic Energy Agency, Enkerlin has been the lead entomologist and technical officer for several high-impact Cooperation Projects in member states of the International Atomic Energy Agency, including projects responsible for eradicating the Mediterranean fruit fly from Argentina’s Patagonia region, Patagonia was declared as a fruit fly free area by the USDA-APHIS in 2005 and eradicating the Cactoblastis cactorum (cactus moth) in Mexico in 2009. For eradicating the Mediterranean fruit fly from the Dominican Republic in 2017, his team was awarded the prestigious IAEA Superior Achievement Award. That same year, he was jointly awarded the prestigious teamwork award from FAO-AG Department.

== Published work ==
Enkerlin has published over 50 scientific articles in peer-reviewed journals and book chapters, including the first-ever article published in a scientific journal on the Moscamed Program of the Governments of Mexico, Guatemala and the USA. In 2019, two of his articles received recognition from the British Journal Entomologia Experimentalis et Applicata for being one of the top 20 most consulted articles in 2017 and 2018. He is also the author of 5 harmonized technical manuals of the FAO/IAEA. The manuals are used as reference documents in several fruit fly International Standards of Phytosanitary Measures, as well as independently by Member Countries of the FAO and IAEA.

== Education ==
Enkerlin has a Bachelor’s degree in Agriculture Parasitology and a Masters in Science Plant Protection from Instituto Tecnológico y de Estudios Superiores de Monterrey, and a PhD in Applied Entomology from Imperial College London. He is the son of internationally renowned entomologist Dieter Enkerlin and brother of notable Mexican conservationist Ernesto Enkerlin.
