= Equivalence (trade) =

Equivalence is a term applied by the Uruguay Round Agreement on the Application of Sanitary and Phytosanitary Measures. World Trade Organization (WTO) Member countries shall accord acceptance to the Sanitary and Phytosanitary (SPS) measures of other countries (even if those measures differ from their own or from those used by other Member countries trading in the same product) if the exporting country demonstrates to the importing country that its measures achieve the importer’s appropriate level of sanitary and phytosanitary protection.

== History ==
In June 2021 a trade dispute threatened to erupt between the UK and the von der Leyen Commission over the Northern Irish Protocol (NIP) which flowed from Brexit. The position of Lord Frost and the Johnson government was that trade equivalence with the European Union over SPS measures could be maintained with "a recognition of mutually high standards", whereas his opposite number Maros Sefcovic insisted that Northern Ireland join the Common Veterinary Area which resulted from the SUEVA under a dynamic alignment. President Biden had even been drawn into the diplomatic conflict because his National Security Advisor feared a breakdown in public order. A leaked memo obtained by the Times of London "suggested that if the UK signed up to EU rules on agricultural standards to ease problems with the NIP Mr Biden would ensure it did not 'negatively affect the chances of reaching a US/UK trade deal'".
