= Okumu =

Okumu is a surname. Notable people with the surname include:

- Caroline King-Okumu, geographer
- Dave Okumu (born 1976), Austrian musician, songwriter, and producer
- Godfrey Okumu, Kenyan volleyball coach
- John Sibi-Okumu, Kenyan actor
- Joseph Okumu (born 1997), Kenyan footballer
- Washington Aggrey Jalang'o Okumu (1936–2016), Kenyan diplomat, politician and author
