= Pest risk analysis =

Pest risk analysis (PRA) is a form of risk analysis conducted by regulatory plant health authorities to identify the appropriate phytosanitary measures required to protect plant resources against new or emerging pests and regulated pests of plants or plant products. Specifically pest risk analysis is a term used within the International Plant Protection Convention (IPPC) (Article 2.1) and is defined within the glossary of phytosanitary terms. as "the process of evaluating biological or other scientific and economic evidence to determine whether an organism is a pest, whether it should be regulated, and the strength of any phytosanitary measures to be taken against it". In a phytosanitary context, the term plant pest, or simply pest, refers to any species, strain or biotype of plant, animal or pathogenic agent injurious to plants or plant products and includes plant pathogenic bacteria, fungi, fungus-like organisms, viruses and virus like organisms, as well as insects, mites, nematodes and weeds.

== Pest risk analysis and the international plant protection convention ==
Introduced plant pests can lower crop yields and have environmental impacts. The spread of plant pests from one geographical area to another is an issue of international concern. The principal international agreement aimed at addressing the spread of plant pests through international trade is the International Plant Protection Convention, a multilateral treaty for international cooperation in plant protection aimed at preventing the spread of pests of plants and plant products, and promoting appropriate measures for their control (IPPC, Article I.1).

In accordance with the WTO Sanitary and Phytosanitary Agreement the IPPC aims to protect plants while limiting interference with international trade. A key principle of the IPPC is that contracting parties (signatories) provide ‘technical justification’ to support phytosanitary decision making affecting trade. The IPPC recognises pest risk analysis as the appropriate format for such technical justification. The responsibility for conducting pest risk analysis sits within government, specifically within a country's National Plant Protection Organization (NPPO) and comes as an obligation when countries become contracting parties to the IPPC (IPPC Article IV, 2a).

IPPC standards, referred to as International Standards for Phytosanitary Measures (ISPM), have been developed to assist NPPOs. The primary ISPMs relevant to pest risk analysis are ISPM 2, Framework for pest risk analysis, ISPM 11, Pest risk analysis for quarantine pests and ISPM 21, Pest risk analysis for regulated non-quarantine pests. Although ISPMs relating to pest risk analysis provide guidance regarding the factors to consider when conducting analyses, they do not provide instructions as to how to actually perform a pest risk analysis. However, many countries including Australia, New Zealand and the USA, have developed procedures to assess the pest risks associated with the import of plant commodities. Devorshak (2012) describes the principles of pest risk analysis, how analyses can be performed and the use of pest risk analysis in regulatory plant protection. A general guide to the principles of pest risk analysis for plant pests and a description of some of the problems and difficulties that may be encountered when undertaking such analyses are included in text by Ebbels (2003) which also covers wider plant health issues.

== Stages within a pest risk analysis ==
In accordance with ISPM 11, a pest risk analysis consists of three stages.

=== Stage 1: initiation ===
Common reasons for initiating a pest risk analysis include:

- Pest-based information, e.g. a pest is detected during inspection of an imported commodity; a pest is reported to be spreading; a pest outbreak is detected; a new pest is reported in scientific literature.
- Pathway-based information, e.g. a mechanism potentially facilitating the entry or spread of a pest is identified. Mechanisms include new trade pathways, usually of plants or plant products but could also include articles used in the transport and distribution of traded goods such as pests carried as contaminants of passenger baggage and natural spread.
- Review of existing phytosanitary policy, e.g. new information that impacts on an earlier phytosanitary decision can cause a review of policy as can disputes over phytosanitary measures.

Within the initiation stage of a pest risk analysis the reason for conducting the analysis, the identity of the pest and or pathways being analysed and the area in relation to which the analysis is conducted (the pest risk analysis area) is provided.

=== Stage 2: pest risk assessment ===
There are three steps to the assessment of pest risk.

- Step 1: Pest categorization

The purpose of pest categorization is to determine whether a pest identified during the initiation stage satisfies the criteria of being a quarantine pest. A quarantine pest is a pest of potential economic importance to the area endangered thereby and not yet present there, or present but not widely distributed and being officially controlled. Pest categorization includes all the main elements considered in Step 2 of a pest risk assessment but the elements are considered in less detail and pest categorization is essentially a quick assessment of whether the analysis should continue. The categorization step provides an opportunity to eliminate a pest from analysis at an early stage in the pest risk analysis process thus avoiding unnecessary in-depth examination. Pest categorization can be done with relatively little information, provided that the information available is sufficient to carry out the categorization.

- Step 2: Assessment of pest entry, establishment and spread.

Assessing the likelihood of pest entry requires assessment of each of the pathways with which a pest may be associated, from its origin to its establishment in the pest risk analysis area. In a pest risk analysis initiated by a specific pathway, often an imported commodity or goods associated with an imported commodity, e.g. packing materials, the probability of pest entry is evaluated for that specific pathway. For a pest risk analysis initiated for a specific pest, all probable pathways are evaluated for that individual pest.

To estimate the likelihood of establishment of a pest, biological information about the pest including its life cycle, its hosts or habitat needs, or a diseases epidemiology, together with characteristics of the abiotic environment affecting pest survival such as temperature, precipitation and perhaps soil type affecting its geographic range limit need to be considered. The environmental conditions under which the pest does not survive are also important to understand. Conditions in the pest risk analysis area can then be compared with conditions in areas where the pest survives, and in areas where the pest is known not to be able to survive, so as to assess the likelihood that the pest will establish in the pest risk analysis area. Computer simulation models can be used to inform assessments of likelihood of establishment.

When assessing the likelihood and magnitude of pest spread, the pest's ability to disperse from a point of introduction to new areas within the pest risk analysis area is assessed. The assessment should consider pest population dynamics and the natural mobility of the pest and take into account potential spread via wind, water, soil, seed and pollen, and insect, fungal or nematode vectors as well as spread via human activities such as movement of host material.

- Step 3: Assessment of potential consequences resulting from pest entry, establishment and spread.

In this step the potential impacts that could be expected to result from a pest's introduction and spread is identified, described and, as much as possible, quantified. Pest impacts can take many forms; they may be economic environmental or social impacts. Information on the species impacts in areas where it is already present, and particularly in areas where it has already spread to, together with information influencing the elements of risk in the pest risk analysis area, inform the assessment of potential consequences. Impacts reported from invaded areas are recognized as the best indicator of potential impacts in the pest risk analysis area . However, regarding environmental impacts, if the pest has not previously spread then the absence of any environmental impact in the area of pest origin should not be interpreted to mean that no environmental impact should be expected in the pest risk analysis area. This is because environmental impacts are difficult to predict and a lack of impact in the origin is not a good predictor that there will be no impacts in regions where a pest is introduced.

Recognising that risk is a combination of likelihood and consequences, the results of steps 2 and 3 are combined to provide an overall estimation of pest risk.

=== Stage 3: pest risk management ===
For a quarantine pest, pest risk management is the process of evaluation and selection of options to reduce the risk of introduction and spread of the pest. Conclusions from the pest risk assessment (Stage 2) are used to support decisions regarding the level of risk presented by the pest. If a pest is judged to present an unacceptable risk then phytosanitary measures should be identified that will reduce the risk to an acceptable level. Phytosanitary measures should accord with IPPC principles of necessity, managed risk, minimal impact, transparency, harmonization, non-discrimination and technical justification.

ISPM 11 provides more information about each stage of pest risk analysis for quarantine pests.

== Level of detail required ==
The level of detail in a pest risk analysis will be limited by the amount and quality of information available, the tools, and time available before a decision is required. Quantitative and qualitative techniques are used in pest risk analysis but pest risk analysis need only be as complex as is required by the circumstances to support a phytosanitary decision and provide the necessary technical justification to defend decisions regarding phytosanitary measures. Nevertheless, a pest risk analysis should be based on sound science, be transparent and consistent with other pest risk analyses conducted by the NPPO. Examples of pest risk analysis are available in the EPPO Platform on PRA.

== Uncertainty ==
Estimating the likelihood of pest introduction and of the consequences that could result involves many uncertainties. Uncertainty is always part of pest risk analysis; very often there is a lack of data necessary to reach secure conclusions. The subjective nature of pest risk analysis is also a source of uncertainty. ISPM 11 recognises that pest risk analysis involves many uncertainties, largely since estimates and extrapolations are made from real situations where the pest occurs to a hypothetical situation in the pest risk analysis area. In most cases analyses performed during pest risk analysis use historical data to forecast potential future events. It is important to document the areas of uncertainty and the degree of uncertainty in the assessment, and to indicate where expert judgement has been used. This is necessary for transparency and may also be useful for identifying and prioritizing research needs.

== Criticism of pest risk analysis ==
Pest risk analysis, as conducted under the IPPC and SPS Agreement, has been criticised for being reactive, only coming into effect after a pest problem has been identified. For example, many pests now subject to phytosanitary measures, supported by pest risk analysis, only became recognised as potential risks once they had already escaped from their geographical centres of origin and caused impacts in other parts of the world. Some ‘newly escaped’ organisms were previously unknown to science before they escaped and current international standards for pest risk analysis cannot assess risks from unknown organisms. In addition, a pest risk analysis will focus on a pest at the species level assuming the pest to be genetically stable but this can be a great oversimplification if the pest has a short generation time with capacity for rapid genetic change. During the assessment of impact, assessors focus on impacts on known hosts or habitats. However, if a pest adapts to a new host plant or habitat once established in the pest risk analysis area, impacts will be underestimated. Risk analyses for invasive species have also been criticised for being narrowly focused, subjective, often arbitrary and unquantified, and subject to political interference.

== See also ==
- Convention on Biological Diversity
- Crop protection
- International Plant Protection Convention
- Invasive species
- ISPM 15
- Pest (organism)
- Plant quarantine
- Risk analysis
- World Trade Organization
- WTO Agreement on the Application of Sanitary and Phytosanitary Measures
