= Boshra Salem =

Professor

Boshra Salem is a professor, founder and the Chair of the Department of Environmental Sciences at Alexandria University in Alexandria, Egypt. She is president of Unesco's Man and the Biosphere (MAB) International Coordinating Council (ICC) and serves on the International Council for Science (ICSU)'s Committee for Scientific Planning & Review. She has received a number of awards, including being recognized as an outstanding female scientist in the Women in Science Hall of Fame by the Embassy of the United States in Cairo, Egypt.

== Education ==
Boshra Salem was awarded her Ph.D. jointly by the University of Alexandria and Imperial College London in 1989. She studied land use in arid lands using remote sensing techniques. As a post-doctoral fellow at the University of London (1994) and the University of Maryland (1996) she worked with computational tools and databases for geographic and environmental information management.

== Research ==
Salem's major fields of interest are land degradation and desertification in arid environments, and the use of remote sensing, GIS applications and electronic databases to monitor and model changes. She is involved with the development of protected areas and biosphere reserves for biodiversity conservation, environmental impact assessment and strategic environment assessment, and alternative solar energy sources. She developed an international solar desalination project for Bedouin communities. She is team leader for Egypt's Omayed Biosphere Reserve project, which received the 1997 Sultan Qaboos Prize for Environmental Preservation for its work in Egypt's Western Desert. and has worked with Caroline King-Okumu and others on the Sustainable Management of Marginal Drylands (SUMAMAD) project.

== Awards ==
- 1990, UNESCO MAB Young Scientist Award, for "Detection of temporal environmental changes in arid lands by remote sensing. Case study: North coastal desert of Egypt"
- 1997, Sultan Qaboos Prize for Environmental Preservation, to the Department of Environmental Sciences, Faculty of Science, University of Alexandria (Egypt) for its work with the Omayed Biosphere Reserve
- 2009, UNESCO Young Scientists Awards: Michel Batisse grant for biosphere reserve management case studies
- 2013, Women in Science Hall of Fame, Embassy of the United States, Cairo, Egypt, to honor outstanding female scientists throughout the Middle East and North Africa
