= International Year of Plant Health =

In December 2018, the United Nations General Assembly adopted a Resolution declaring 2020 as the International Year of Plant Health (IYPH). The purpose of the IYPH was to raise global awareness on how protecting plant health can help end hunger, reduce poverty, protect the environment, and boost economic development.

Due to disruption of the planned activities during 2020, some IYPH activities have been continued into the next year, including the declaration by the United States Department of Agriculture's Animal and Plant Health Inspection Service making April 2021 the Invasive Plant Pest and Disease Awareness Month for the US. The European and Mediterranean Plant Protection Organization promoted an original awareness campaign with the mascot Beastie the Bug who travelled to 44 countries despite the travel restrictions associated to covid-19 (https://beastiebug.eppo.int/)

The IYPH extended schedule lasted through July 2021 and greatly increased the news media coverage and number of the public informed, in a wide array of languages.

As a legacy of the International Year of Plant Health, an International Day of Plant Health (IDPH) will be observed by the international community on 12 May each year.

== See also ==
- Agronomy
- Integrated pest management
- Plant health
