= Dieter Enkerlin =

Mexican biologist, entomologist

Dieter Enkerlin Schallenmüller
- Born: December 14, 1926
- Died: 27 December 1995 (aged 69)
- Education: Facultad de Ciencias Universidad Nacional Autonoma de Mexico (UNAM), Cornell University New York, Texas A&M University
- Known for: Integrated Pest Control, Economic Entomology, Sterile Insect Technique
- Awards: National Plant Protection Award (SENASICA 2001), Rockefeller Foundation Fellow

Dieter Enkerlin Schallenmüller was a Mexican biologist, entomologist, and professor who pioneered the use of Integrated Pest Management (IPM) in Latin America. In 2001, Enkerlin posthumously received the National Plant Protection Award (SENASICA 2001) from the Mexican Government for his outstanding contributions to protecting plant resources in Mexico.

== Biography ==
Enkerlin obtained a biology degree from the Universidad Nacional Autonoma de Mexico (UNAM). After being awarded a Rockefeller Foundation Fellowship, he completed a Masters of Science from the Cornell University followed by a Doctorate Degree in Entomology from Texas A&M University.

Enkerlin returned to Mexico to find one of Mexico's first bachelor degrees in Plant Parasitology as well as the Agriculture Postgraduate Department at the Monterrey Institute of Technology and Higher Education (ITSEM). In 1971 he became the Director of both programs - positions he held until his retirement.

In 1952 he co-founded the Mexican Entomological Society, and was its President from 1963-1965. In 1969 he organized the first course on Atomic Energy in Entomology for Latin America sponsored by the Food and Agriculture Organization of the United Nations (FAO) and the International Atomic Energy Agency (IAEA) to establish work networks to spread the use of new and less contaminating methods for pest control. In 1968 he was invited by the Joint FAO/IAEA Division for Nuclear Techniques in Food and Agriculture in Vienna, Austria, as an entomologist in the Section of Insect Eradication and Pest Control.

In 1977, together with Ing. Jorge Gutierrez Samperio, General Director of Plant Protection in Mexico, Enkerlin spearheaded scientific and technical support for the Moscamed Programme - an international commission to protect fruit and vegetable production and commercialization in Guatemala, Mexico and the USA from the invasion of the Mediterranean fruit fly using Sterile Insect Technique. The pest was eradicated from Mexico in 1982 and its northward spread contained, protecting the horticultural industry of the three countries valued at billions of US dollars per annum.

Enkerlin's research was published in over 50 scientific articles, book chapters and outreach materials in national and international journals and technical documents including documents of the FAO and the IAEA.

As a tribute to his contributions to the field of entomology, in 1977 his colleagues named an insect after Enkerlin: Sylvicanthon enkerlini (Coleoptera: Scarabaeidae). Years later, the Mexican Society of Entomology in a posthumous tribute named 5 newly discovered species of insects after him.: The Collembola Dietersminthurus enkerlinius, the trips Scirtothrips dieterenkerlini, the beetle Phyllophaga dieteriana (Coleoptera: Melolonthidae), and the Anastrepha enkerlini (Diptera: Tephritide).

In 2011, the National Postal Services in Mexico printed a series of commemorative stamps dedicated to plant protection and food safety which featured a tribute to SIT and depicted Enkerlin. In 2005, the auditorium at the Colegio de la Frontera Sur (ECOSUR) in Tapachula, Chiapas, Mexico, was named "Dieter Enkerlin". In 2011, the Mexican fruit fly mass rearing and sterilization facility of the Mexican National Fruit Fly Programme (SENASICA-SAGARPA), was named "Dr. Dieter Enkerlin Schallenmüller".

In November 2020, he received a posthumous tribute from the Mexican Entomological Society for his legacy in integrated pest management and positive influence over generations of agronomists, entomologists and biologists, including his son, Walther Enkerlin. He is also the father of notable Mexican conservationist Ernesto Enkerlin.
