= Plant Protection and Inspection Services (Israel) =

Agency in Israeli Ministry of Agriculture

- השירותים להגנת הצומח ולביקורת

Service overview
- Jurisdiction: Government of Israel
- Headquarters: Derech HaMaccabim, Rishon LeZion, Israel (דרך המכבים, ראשון לציון) (Open Location Code XRWC+F3 Rishon LeTsiyon, Israel)
- Minister responsible: Alon Schuster, Minister of Agriculture and Rural Development
- Service executive: David Opatowski, Head, Plant Biosecurity
- Parent department: Ministry of Agriculture and Rural Development
- Key document: Organization structure
- Website: PPIS

The Plant Protection and Inspection Services unit is an agency of the Ministry of Agriculture of Israel. PPIS handles phytosanitary matters both within Israel and in foreign trade. In pursuit of that purpose, it operates offices both within the country and in its foreign embassies, and acts as representative to some international bodies such as the IPPC (International Plant Protection Convention) and the EPPO (European and Mediterranean Plant Protection Organization).
