= SENASA Perú =

- Servicio Nacional de Sanidad Agraria del Perú

Agency overview
- Jurisdiction: Government of Peru
- Headquarters: Av. La Molina 1915 La Molina, Lima, Lima - Lima 12 Perú
- Agency executive: Mr. Rafael Guillén Encinas, Director-General of Plant Health [Director General de Sanidad Vegetal]
- Parent department: Ministry of Agriculture
- Website: http://www.gob.pe/senasa

SENASA Perú (Spanish: Servicio Nacional de Sanidad Agraria del Perú) is an agency within the Peruvian Ministry of Agriculture. SENASA is responsible for protecting the country against agricultural pests and diseases in both crops and livestock. SENASA handles communications, import inspections, export inspections, and treaty negotiations regarding agricultural health; for example participating in the International Plant Protection Convention and making agreements with foreign governments.
