= Vegetable sector in France =

The vegetable sector in France is largely regulated within the framework of the Common Agricultural Policy of the European Union and the Common organisation of agricultural markets for fruit and vegetables. Within this framework, recognised producer organisations help farmers pool part of their sales, market their products collectively, and negotiate more effectively with buyers such as wholesalers and retailers.

EU law also provides marketing standards for fresh fruit and vegetables. According to the European Commission conformity with these standards is required at all stages of marketing, including import, export and retail sale, subject to certain exemptions. National authorities are required to carry out selective official inspections based on risk analysis, meaning that controls are targeted more closely at products or operators considered more likely to present a problem.

== National regulation ==
At national level, the sector is overseen primarily by the French Ministry of Agriculture and Food Sovereignty, with market monitoring and sectoral analysis provided in particular by FranceAgriMer and Agreste, the statistical service of the ministry.

For the fresh produce chain, the main interbranch body is Interfel, which brings together representative organisations from the different stages of the fresh fruit and vegetable supply chain, from production to distribution.

Since 2023, the French government has also promoted a Plan de souveraineté pour la filière fruits et légumes ("sovereignty plan" for the fruit and vegetable sector). According to the ministry, the plan was launched after the observation that roughly half of the fruits and vegetables consumed in France were imported, and it set a goal of increasing national production capacity in the sector by 2030 and 2035 through investment, innovation and adaptation measures.

=== Supply side ===
==== Production ====
Vegetable production in France includes open-field crops, market gardening, greenhouse cultivation and vegetables grown for processing industries. FranceAgriMer reported that, in 2024, total vegetable production amounted to about 5.5 million tonnes on roughly 256,000 hectares.

According to the same source, the leading vegetables by production volume in 2024 were onions (13%), tomatoes (13%) and carrots (12%). FranceAgriMer also notes that French vegetable output has declined over the past two decades compared with the mid-2000s, although it has tended to stabilise in recent years.

The production base is geographically diverse and labour-intensive. FranceAgriMer reported more than 27,000 holdings producing vegetables in 2020, including more than 7,600 holdings specialised in vegetables for industry.

share of GDP, geographical repartition, type of vegetable produced..

==== Key actors ====
The French vegetable sector includes a wide range of actors, from individual farmers and agricultural cooperatives to producer organisations, wholesalers, processors, retailers and interbranch bodies.

In the processed fruit and vegetable sector, FranceAgriMer reported 125 producer organisations in 2020, alongside about 14,700 farms supplying vegetables and fruit for processing.

The structure of production combines relatively large commercial operators with many smaller farms. FranceAgriMer reported that France had 27,477 farms producing vegetables in 2020, including 5,534 market-gardening farms and 7,610 farms specialised in vegetables for industry. This diversity contributes to a sectoral structure in which industrial supply chains coexist with smaller-scale and more specialised farms.

Professional representation in the sector includes several farmers' unions and employer organisations, although these organisations represent agriculture more broadly and are not limited to vegetables alone. In practice, public debate on the sector often distinguishes between the interests of larger, industry-linked operators and those of smaller farms, especially on issues such as prices, market power, imports, environmental regulation and production costs.

== Quality standards ==
Fresh vegetables sold in France are subject to EU marketing standards, alongside broader requirements relating to food safety, traceability, plant health and pesticide residues. In practice, these rules concern matters such as the presentation and labelling of products, limits on pesticide residues, and measures intended to prevent the spread of plant diseases and pests. The European Commission states that fresh fruit and vegetables marketed to consumers must comply with standards concerning quality and presentation, and that the country of origin must be indicated in the cases provided for by EU law.

Quality differentiation in France also includes the use of organic certification and the EU geographical-quality schemes of PDO and PGI, although these labels concern only some products and are not specific to the vegetable sector as a whole.

Interfel identifies the regulatory framework of the fresh fruit and vegetable chain as a combination of French, European and international rules governing commercial relations, product marketing and interbranch organisation.

== Trade ==
=== Intra-European trade ===
Trade with other European countries plays a central role in the French vegetable market. FranceAgriMer reported that, in 2024, France imported nearly 2.1 million tonnes of fresh vegetables worth about €3.1 billion, while exporting nearly 1.2 million tonnes worth about €1.6 billion.

The same source reported a 2024 trade deficit in fresh vegetables of about 885,000 tonnes and €1.6 billion. Among France's principal export markets by volume in 2024 were Germany, the Netherlands, Italy, Spain, Belgium and Switzerland.

FranceAgriMer notes that some export flows, especially for tomatoes, include a significant share of re-exports, reflecting France's position in broader north–south European supply chains.

=== Trade with non-European countries ===
France also trades vegetables with countries outside Europe. Imports from non-EU countries are governed by the EU customs, sanitary and phytosanitary framework, as well as by conformity checks linked to marketing standards.

Public debate in France has sometimes linked extra-EU imports to questions of competitiveness, environmental standards and regulatory equivalence, particularly in the context of the national sovereignty plan for fruit and vegetables.

== Demand side ==
=== Consumption needs ===
FranceAgriMer also reports household purchasing trends for fresh vegetables. In 2024, average household purchases were about 50.3 kg, down 4% from 2023; the most purchased fresh vegetables were tomatoes, carrots, courgettes, onions, cucumbers and lettuce.

=== National Nutrition and Health Programme (PNNS) ===
Vegetable consumption is also linked to French public-health policy through. Vegetable consumption in France is an important issue in public health policy. Since 2001, the National Nutrition and Health Programme (PNNS) has sought to improve the health of the population through nutrition policy. The programme promotes healthier diets and has long encouraged regular fruit and vegetable consumption as part of broader nutritional recommendations.

Public-health institutions have noted that a substantial share of the French population does not consume fruits and vegetables at levels consistent with national recommendations, and that consumption patterns vary by gender, income and region.

According to Santé publique France, in metropolitan France in 2021, 19% of men and 25% of women aged 18 to 85 reported fruit and vegetable consumption consistent with PNNS recommendations. The same study found strong social and territorial inequalities in compliance with dietary recommendations.

== Stakes ==
Several recurring issues shape public and policy debates on the vegetable sector in France, including competition, food sovereignty, and environmental costs.

=== Competition ===
Competition is a central issue in the French vegetable sector. Producers operate within the European single market, where they compete with suppliers from other member states as well as from non-EU countries. Differences in labour costs, climatic conditions, production scale, and marketing structures have often been cited in public debate as factors affecting the competitiveness of French production.

In this context, producer organisations, interbranch bodies and public authorities have sought to improve competitiveness through investment, market coordination, product differentiation and support for innovation.

=== Food sovereignty ===
Since the early 2020s, the notion of food sovereignty has occupied an increasingly prominent place in French agricultural policy. In the fruit and vegetable sector, this has referred mainly to the objective of increasing domestic production capacity and reducing dependence on imports for part of national consumption.

The French Ministry of Agriculture has presented a dedicated sovereignty plan for the fruit and vegetable sector, aimed at strengthening production, encouraging investment and supporting adaptation to climatic and economic pressures.

=== Environmental cost ===
The environmental cost of vegetable production and distribution is another important issue. Public debate and policy discussions have focused on water use, greenhouse-heated production, transport, packaging, pesticide use and the environmental effects of long supply chains.

These concerns have contributed to interest in seasonal consumption, shorter supply chains, production methods with lower environmental impact, and the broader integration of environmental objectives into agricultural policy.
