= EQV =

EQV may refer to:

- Logical biconditional, a type of logical connective
- Logical equality, a logical operator
- Mercedes-Benz Concept EQV, a concept van in the Mercedes-Benz EQ family of battery-electric vehicles
- Mercedes-Benz EQV, an electric minivan, version of the Vito
- EQV, a band founded by Margita Stefanović

== See also ==
- equivalence (disambiguation)
- EQW
- Equ
