= Beagle Brigade =

American airport inspection team

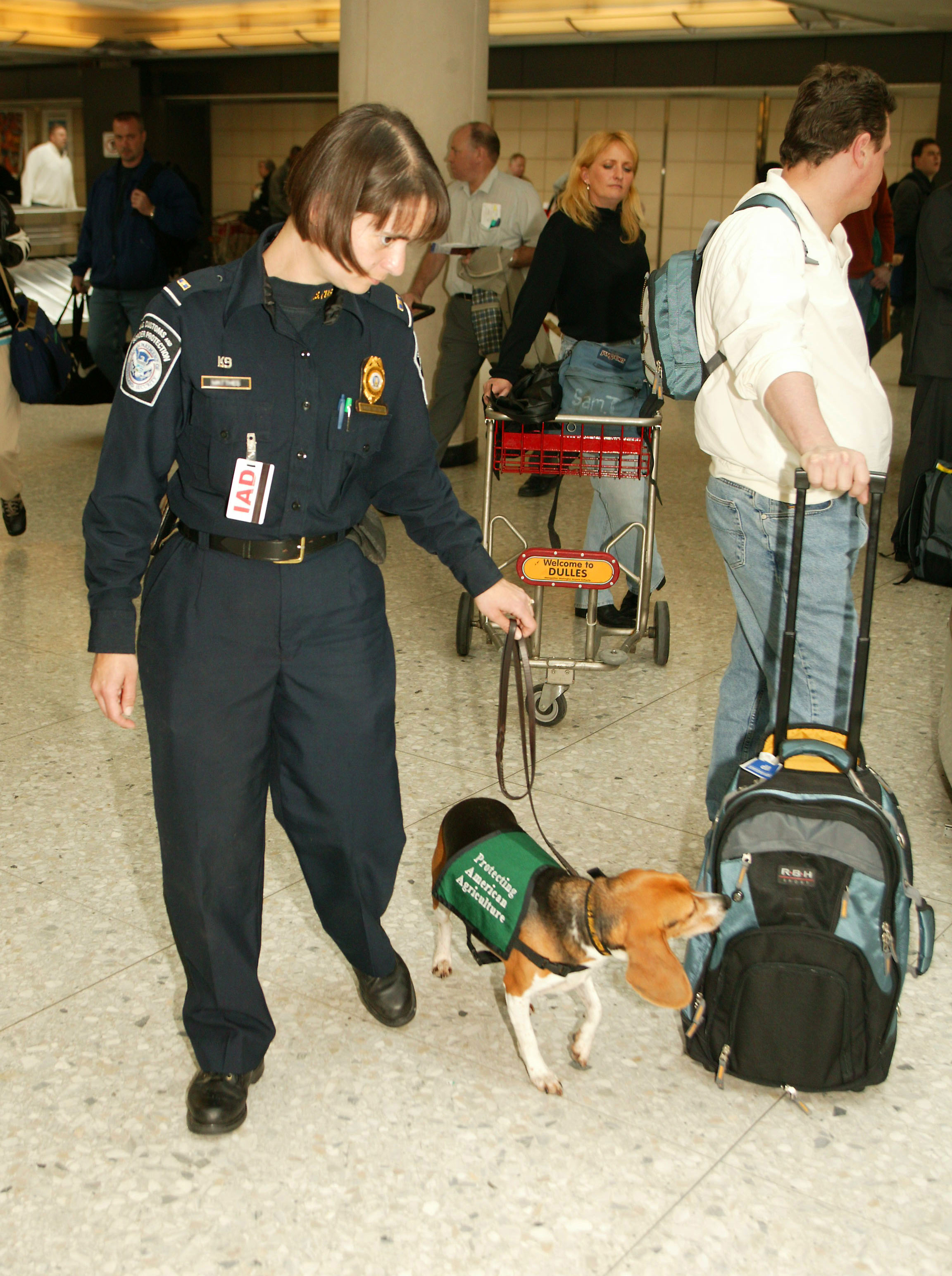
A member of the Beagle Brigade checks passengers for illegal food products.

Beagle Brigade is a team of beagles and their human handlers who, as part of the United States Department of Agriculture's Animal and Plant Health Inspection Service (APHIS), inspect luggage at U.S. airports searching for agricultural products. According to the USDA, the Beagle Brigade program averages around 75,000 seizures of prohibited agricultural products a year.

== History ==
The APHIS airport inspection program begun in 1984 at Los Angeles International Airport. In 2004, there were more than 60 Beagle Brigade teams at 21 international airports. The canine members of the Beagle Brigade have either been donated by private owners and breeders, or rescued from animal shelters. The dogs are evaluated for appropriateness, such as friendliness and intelligence. Those beagles that are not selected for the program are placed in adoptive homes. None are returned to animal shelters.

== Overview ==
Beagles have the ability to categorize smells. Therefore, they can distinguish between smells emanating from restricted items (such as fruit, vegetables, and meat) and non-restricted items. When a member of the Beagle Brigade smells a restricted scent, it sits down next to the luggage to alert its handler, who then talks to the owner, and, if necessary, performs a search. Experienced beagles have a 90% success rate, and can recognize almost 50 distinct smells.

A beagle's career with the Beagle Brigade usually lasts between six and ten years. When they retire, they are usually adopted by their handlers (handlers and dogs are paired throughout the beagle's career). Otherwise, they are placed in adoptive homes.

The USDA National Detector Dog Training Center in Newnan, Georgia, receives beagles donated by private owners, breeders, and animal shelters.

=== Background ===
Unauthorized meat, animal byproducts, fruit and vegetables can carry diseases and pests that have the potential to infect U.S. agriculture. For example, foot-and-mouth disease could be introduced into the U.S. via contaminated meat products brought into the country by a traveller. The APHIS works in conjunction with the U.S. Customs and Border Protection and the United States Public Health Service at entry points to the U.S., including land borders, ports and airports. The Beagle Brigade generally works in the baggage-claim area at international airports.

Originally bred for rabbit hunting, the beagle has an acute sense of smell; they can detect smells that are too faint to be sensed by scientific equipment. In addition, they have a voracious and undiscerning appetite. Beagles are generally friendly and gentle with people, and, due to their small size, are not intimidating. For these reasons, beagles were chosen as the breed to be used for these APHIS airport inspections.
