= Uniform methods and rules =

The Uniform methods and rules are documents by the Veterinary Services office of USDA's Animal and Plant Health Inspection Service (APHIS) that specify the minimum standards for preventing, detecting, controlling, and/or eradicating a particular animal disease. APHIS in late 2004 had UM&Rs posted on bovine tuberculosis eradication, brucellosis, brucellosis in cervidae, equine infectious anemia, pseudorabies eradication, swine brucellosis control/eradication, and voluntary scrapie flock certification program standards. UM&Rs usually are developed with input from state animal health authorities, industry, and the U.S. Animal Health Association. Although not legally binding, as are laws and regulations, UM&Rs are widely recognized within the industry and profession as the “gold standard” for addressing an animal disease of national concern; they may be incorporated by states into their own animal health codes.
