= Phytosanitary irradiation =

Anti-pest food treatment

Phytosanitary irradiation is a treatment that uses ionizing radiation on commodities, such as fruits and vegetables to inactivate pests, such as insects. This method is used for international food trade as a means to prevent spread of non-native organisms. It is used as an alternative to conventional techniques, which includes heat treatment, cold treatment, pesticide sprays, high pressure treatment, cleaning, waxing or chemical fumigation. It is often used on spices, grains, and non-food items. It inhibits the species reproduction cycle by destroying nuclear material primarily, whereas other methods are measured by species mortality. Each country has different effective approved dosages, although most follow guidelines established by the IPPC which has issued guidelines referred to as the International Standards for Phytosanitary Measures (ISPM). The most commonly used dose is 400 Gy (as a broad spectrum, generic treatment) based on USDA-APHIS guidelines.

== History ==
The foundations of ionizing radiation was first discovered in 1895 by Wilhelm Röntgen through discovery of X-rays. In the following year, Henri Becquerel discovered natural radioactivity, another form of ionizing radiation. Soon after the discovery of ionizing radiation, therapeutic use and bactericide treatments were proposed. Research in the early 1900s demonstrated that X-rays can destroy and hinder the development of the egg, larval and adult stages of cigar beetles. Application of irradiation as a disinfestation procedure for fruit flies was suggested in 1930, however, it was only in 1986 that irradiation up to 1kGy was approved by the FDA as a method to disinfest arthropods in food. Before approval in the United States, Hawaii petitioned for permission of irradiation on papayas in 1972. The FDA finally approved the use of 1 kGy for use on arthropods in fruits and vegetables in 1986. In that same year, the first case of commercial phytosanitary irradiation occurred with Puerto Rican mangoes imported to the Florida market. Three years later, Hawaii received approval for irradiation of papayas at 150 Gy for shipment to mainland U.S. In 2004, Australia and New Zealand opened their markets to phytosanitary irradiation. In 2007, India sent a shipment of mangoes to the U.S., followed by fruit from Thailand, Vietnam, and Mexico. Australia continues to broaden their irradiated exports with new markets in Indonesia, Malaysia and Vietnam.

== Mode of action ==
Ionizing radiation such as gamma rays, electron beam, X-rays can be used to provide phytosanitary treatment. The direct effect of these high energy photons and electrons, as well as the free radicals they produce result in sufficient damage to large organic molecules such as DNA and RNA resulting in sterilization, morbidity or mortality of the target pests. The sources of irradiation for gamma rays are Cobalt 60 and Cesium 137. X-rays are produced by accelerating electrons at metal sources such as gold and electron beams are produced via an electron accelerator.

== Commercial use ==
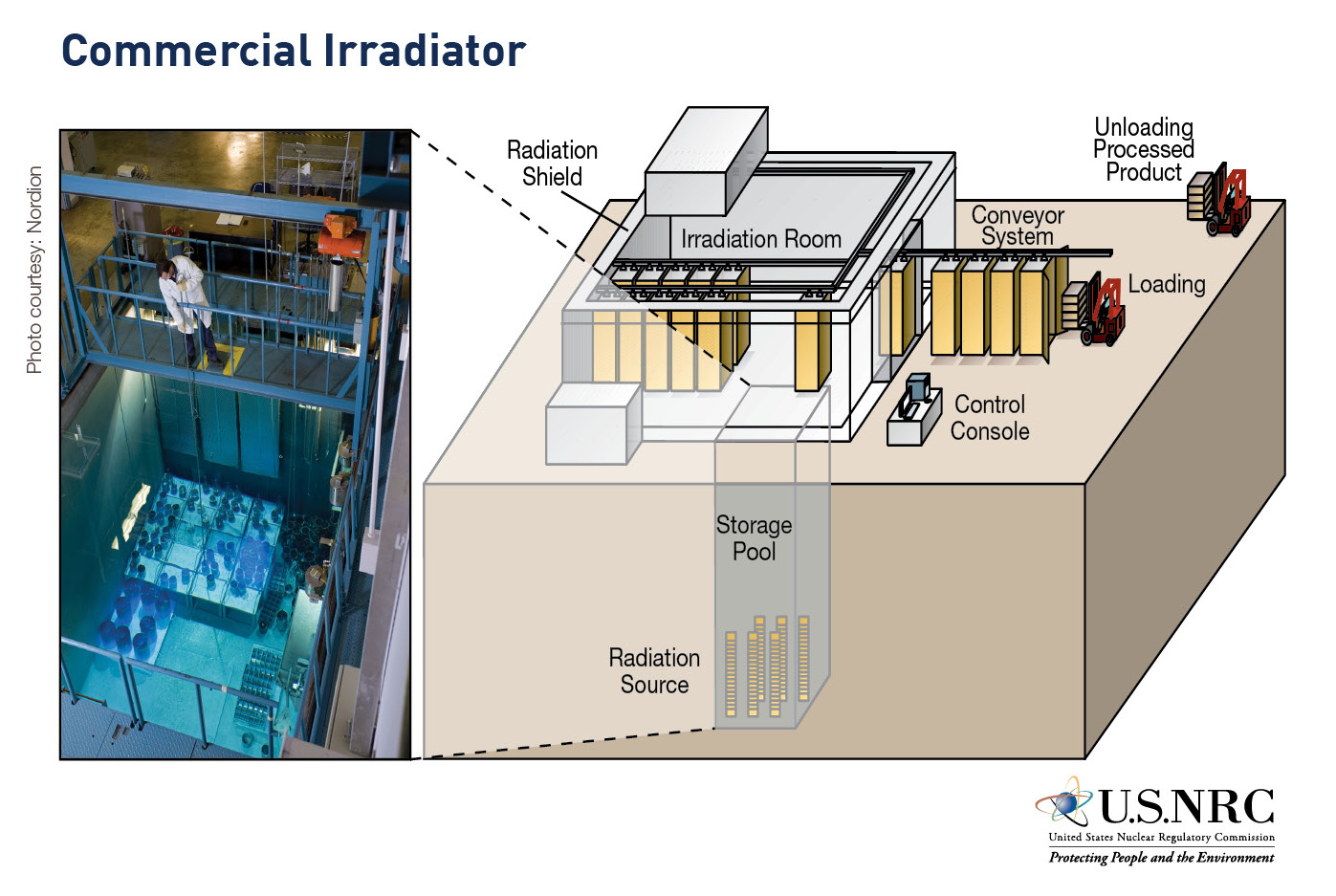
Commercial Irradiator used for sterilizing spices, fruits, vegetables to inactivate pathogenic microbes using sources such as Cobalt 60 and Cesium 137

Phytosanitary irradiation is used to control the spread of non-native species from one geographical area to another. Global trade allows for the procurement of seasonal produce all year round from all over the world, however, there are risks involved due to the spread of invasive species. Irradiation is highly effective as a phytosanitary measure and as a non-thermal treatment, also helps maintain quality of fresh produce. The most commonly used generic dose is 400 Gy to cover most pests of concern except pupae and adults of the order Lepidoptera, which includes moths and butterflies. Generic doses are the dose level used for a specific group of pests and/or products. Irradiation treatment levels depend upon the pests of concern.

== Advantages ==
A key advantage of phytosanitary irradiation is that treatment doses are tolerated by many commodities without adverse effects on their sensory and physicochemical profiles. Conventional methods of phytosanitation, such as hot water dips and fumigation with methyl bromide, can affect sensory quality and damage the fruit. Compared to the doses used for microorganisms, the doses for phytosanitation are considerable lower and adverse effects are minimal. In some climacteric fruit, irradiation delays ripening which extends shelf life and allows the fruit to maintain quality for the long distance shipment between harvest and consumption. Since 2000, phytosanitary irradiation has seen a 10% increase every year. This is in part due to increased restrictions on conventionally used chemicals and the effectiveness in a wide variety of produce. In certain fruits such as rambutan, irradiation is the only method capable of treatment without extensive deterioration as seen from commercial methods. In addition, temperature based phytosanitation methods and chemical fumigation are not entirely reliable. Import inspections still find live pests in commodities treated with these methods.

== Disadvantages ==
Some fruit, such as certain varieties of citrus and avocados have a low tolerance to irradiation and show symptoms of phytotoxicity at low irradiation levels. Sensitivity to irradiation depends on many factors, such as irradiation dose, commodity, and storage conditions. In addition, organic food industries prohibit the use of irradiation on organic products. Lack of communication and education regarding phytosanitary irradiation can hamper its use. Since this treatment causes reproductive sterilization, pests may be present during commodity inspection. The presence of live pests conflict with current inspection standards and there is no clear marker of treatment efficacy. Some other challenges in relation to the commercialization and acceptance of this technology can be attributed to lack of sufficient facilities, cost and inconvenience of treatment, lack of approved treatment for certain pests and concerns about its technology by the key decision makers (traders, shippers, packers). Lack of harmonization of regulations across countries is also a factor that limits its use. Although phytosanitary irradiation has seen an increase in use globally, lack of consumer acceptance in the European Union, Japan, South Korea, and Taiwan limits its use in countries for which these are major export markets.

== See also ==
- Food Irradiation
- Irradiation
- Agreement on the Application of Sanitary and Phytosanitary Measures
