= Equivalence =

Equivalence or Equivalent may refer to:

== Arts and entertainment ==
- Album-equivalent unit, a measurement unit in the music industry
- Equivalence class (music)
- Equivalent VIII, or The Bricks, a minimalist sculpture by Carl Andre
- Equivalents, a series of photographs of clouds by Alfred Stieglitz
- Equivalents (album), a 2019 album by Loscil

== Language ==
- Dynamic and formal equivalence in translation
- Equivalence (formal languages)

== Law ==
- The doctrine of equivalents in patent law
- The equivalence principle as if impacts on the direct effect of European Union law

== Logic ==
- Logical equivalence, where two statements are logically equivalent if they have the same logical content
- Material equivalence, a relationship where the truth of either one of the connected statements requires the truth of the other

== Science and technology ==
=== Chemistry ===
- Equivalent (chemistry)
- Equivalence point
- Equivalent weight

=== Computing ===
- Turing equivalence (theory of computation), or Turing completeness
- Semantic equivalence in computer metadata

=== Economics ===
- Certainty equivalent, a principle related to risk premium
- Economic equivalence, a concept in engineering economics
- Ricardian equivalence, or Ricardo–de Viti–Barro equivalence, a proposition in economics

=== Mathematics ===
- Equality (mathematics)
- Equivalence relation
  - Equivalence class
- Equivalence of categories, in category theory
- Equivalent infinitesimal
- Identity
- Matrix equivalence in linear algebra
- Turing equivalence (recursion theory)
- Elementary equivalence, in mathematical logic

=== Physics ===
- Equivalence principle in the theory of general relativity

== Other uses ==
- Equivalence (trade)
- Moral equivalence, a term used in political debate
- The Equivalent, a sum paid from England to Scotland at their Union in 1707

== See also ==
- Quotations related to Equivalence at Wikiquote
- ≡ (disambiguation)
- Equivalency, a National Collegiate Athletic Association concept
