= Veterinary biologic =

Drugs made from living organisms for use in animals

Veterinary biologics are vaccines, antigens, antitoxins and other preparations made from living organisms (or genetically engineered) and intended for use in diagnosing, treating, or immunizing animals. Unlike some pharmaceutical products, such as antibiotics, most biologics leave no residues in animals. Veterinary biologics are regulated by the Animal and Plant Health Inspection Service (APHIS), which licenses the facilities that produce them and conducts a program to ensure that animal vaccines and other veterinary biologics are safe, pure, potent, and effective.

== See also ==
- Animal drugs
