= Sultan Qaboos Prize for Environmental Preservation =

- Awarded for: outstanding contributions by individuals, groups of individuals, institutes or organizations in the management or preservation of the environment
- Presented by: UNESCO and Sultan Qaboos Bin Said of Oman
- First award: 1991
- Website: https://en.unesco.org/mab/awards#sultan-qaboos

The Sultan Qaboos Prize for Environmental Preservation is a biennial award sponsored by the United Nations Educational, Scientific and Cultural Organization (UNESCO) and the Sultan Qaboos Bin Said of Oman "to afford recognition to outstanding contributions by individuals, groups of individuals, institutes or organizations in the management or preservation of the environment, consistent with the policies, aims and objectives of UNESCO, and in relation to the Organization's programmes in this field."

The award consists of a diploma and a grant of US$70,000.00, which is financed by the interest on a US$250,000.00 donation by Sultan Qaboos Bin Said.

== Laureates ==
Year	Laureate	Country
1991	Instituto de Ecología, A.C.	Mexico
1993	Jan Jenik	Czech Republic
1995	Lake Malawi National Park	Malawi
1997	Department of Environmental Sciences, Alexandria University	Egypt
1997	Forest Department	Sri Lanka
1999	Charles Darwin Foundation	Ecuador
2001	Chad Association of Volunteers for the Protection of the Environment	Chad
2003	Center for Ecology	Venezuela
2003	Peter Johan Schei	Norway
2005	Great Barrier Reef Marine Park Authority	Australia
2005	Ernesto Enkerlin	Mexico
2007	Institute of Biodiversity Conservation	Ethiopia
2007	Julius Oszlányi	Slovakia
2009	Autonomous Authority for National Parks (OAPN)	Spain
2011	Institute for Forest Research of Nigeria	Nigeria
2013	State Forests National Forest Holding	Poland
2013	Endangered Wildlife Trust	South Africa
2015	Fabio A. Kalesnik, Horacio Sirolli and Luciano Iribarren of the Wetlands Ecology Research Group of the University of Buenos Aires	Argentina
2017	The National Parks Board of Singapore	Singapore
2019	Ashoka Trust for Research in Ecology and the Environment (ATREE)	India
2021	Forest Research Institute Malaysia (FRIM)	Malaysia
2021	University for International Cooperation (UCI)	Costa Rica
2024	Namib Desert Environmental Education Trust (NaDEET)	Namibia

== See also ==
- List of environmental awards
