= North American Plant Protection Organization =

Standards organization

- Type: International Organization
- Founded: 1976
- Headquarters: Raleigh, North Carolina
- Key people: Javier Trujillo (Chief Scientist); members = Canada, Mexico, United States

The North American Plant Protection Organization (NAPPO), is the phytosanitary standard setting organization recognized by the North American Free Trade Agreement (NAFTA). It was created in 1976 as a regional organization of the International Plant Protection Convention (IPPC) of the Food and Agriculture Organization (FAO) of the United Nations. Previously based in Ottawa, Ontario, it is now headquartered in Raleigh, North Carolina.

== NAPPO Mandate ==
NAPPO has a global and a regional mandate.

The global mandate comes from Article IX of the New Revised Text (1997) of the International Plant Protection Convention (IPPC) of the Food and Agriculture Organization (FAO) of the United Nations. The main activity under this mandate is to cooperate with the IPPC Secretary in achieving the objectives of the Convention and, where appropriate, cooperating with the Secretary and the Commission in developing international standards.

The goal of the IPPC is to protect the world's cultivated and natural plant resources from the spread and introduction of plant pests while minimizing interference with the international movement of goods and people.

The regional mandate for NAPPO was formalized by Canada, the United States and Mexico in a Cooperative Agreement signed in 1976 at the Minister/Secretary of Agriculture level. The NAPPO Constitution and Bylaws confirm that NAPPO is accountable to the Minister/Secretary of Agriculture in NAPPO member countries.

== NAPPO Mission ==
NAPPO’s mission is to: - Provide a forum for public and private sectors in Canada, the United States and Mexico to collaborate in the development of science-based standards intended to protect agricultural, forest and other plant resources against regulated plant pests, while facilitating trade.

- Participate in related international cooperative efforts.

== Strategic Goals ==
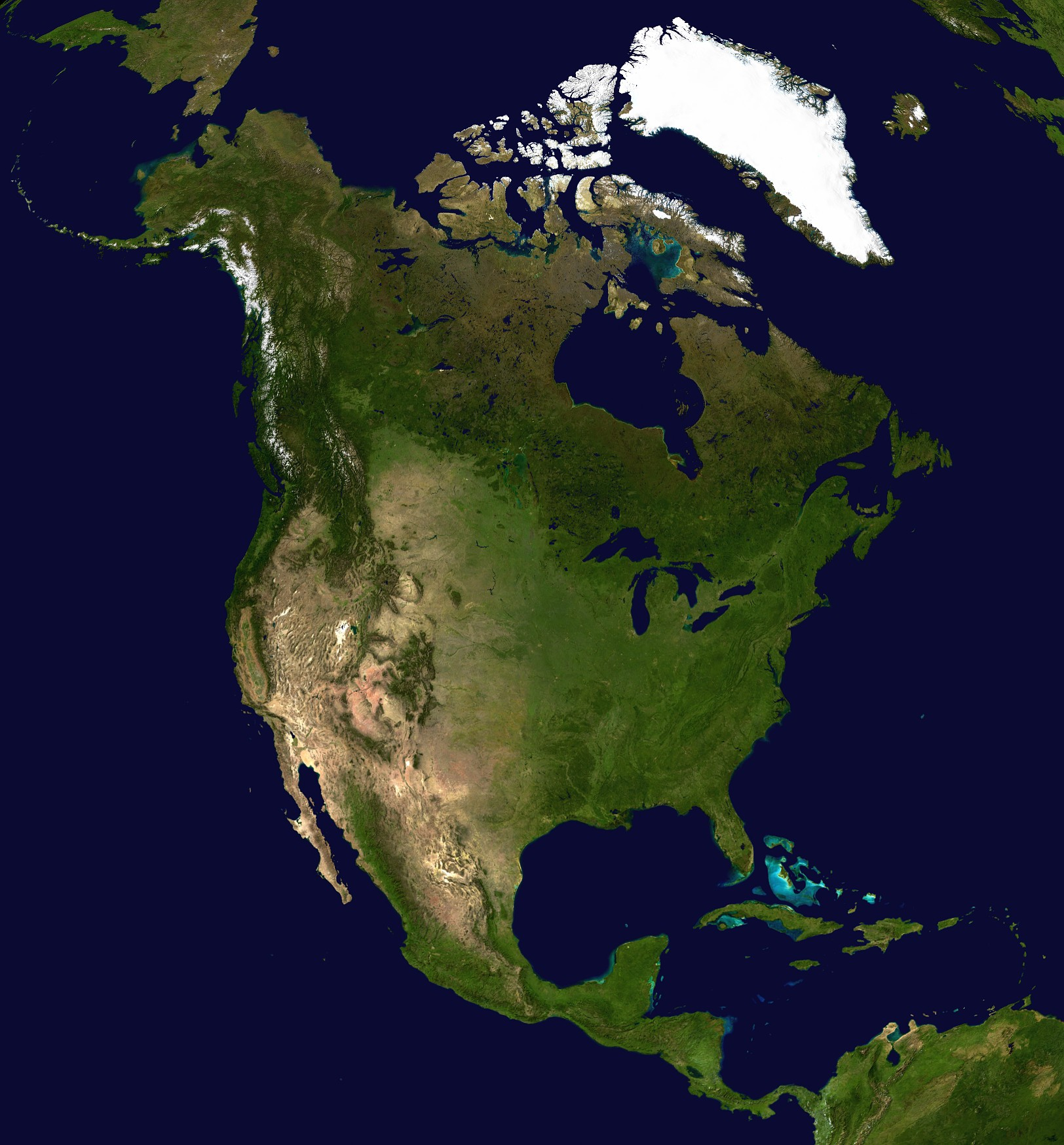
A satellite composite image of North America. Clickable map

In order to accomplish this mission, the following strategic goals have been established:
• Protecting plant resources and the environment
• Capacity building
• Communicating results
• Building partnerships
• Offering an effective dispute settlement mechanism
• Working with sound management practices
• Working with a stable funding base

== Responsibilities ==
NAPPO has responsibilities at the regional, hemispheric and global level.

Regional: Developing regional phytosanitary standards which facilitate the safe movement of plants, plant products and other regulated articles into and within the NAPPO region is a key responsibility. Once a subject has been identified, experts representing the member countries meet in order to develop a draft standard which is submitted to a wider country consultation before final approval. Industry participation in the entire process is encouraged. Examples of standards developed so far include standards for commodities such as potatoes, stone and pome fruit trees, grapevines, citrus and plants for planting; standards for the regulation of biocontrol agents, products of biotechnology and non-Apis pollinating insects; standards for other regulated articles such as wood packing materials and other generic standards such as accreditation of officials to issue phytosanitary certificates.

In addition, NAPPO provides technical support to the Sanitary and Phytosanitary Committee of the North American Free Trade Agreement.

Hemispheric: NAPPO is a member of the Interamerican Coordinating Group in Plant Protection which brings together the regional plant protection organizations of the Americas to coordinate their efforts in protecting the hemisphere from the entry, establishment and spread of regulated pests. This group provides the opportunity to discuss emerging pest situations, to coordinate our control efforts and to provide technical assistance. NAPPO also works with other hemispheric organizations such as OIRSA and COSAVE on topics of mutual interest.

Global: On a global level NAPPO supports the Secretariat of the International Plant Protection Convention by assisting in the development of international standards for phytosanitary measures and monitoring their application in the NAPPO region. It works with other Regional Plant Protection Organizations by exchanging information on current phytosanitary issues at their Annual Technical Consultation and to support the work program of the Commission on Phytosanitary Measures of the IPPC.

== NAPPO member countries ==
Canada
United States
Mexico

== See also ==
- Plant Protection and Quarantine
- Phytosanitary certificate
