= Plant quarantine =

Disease- and pest-free plant technique

Plant quarantine is a technique for ensuring disease- and pest-free plants, whereby a plant is isolated while tests are performed to detect the presence of a problem.

== Administration ==
=== United States ===
In the U.S., the Animal and Plant Health Inspection Service (APHIS) retains the plant quarantine function, although the agency's border-inspection function was transferred to the Department of Homeland Security (DHS) by P.L. 107-296.
