= Animal and Plant Health Inspection Service =

United States federal agency

Agency overview
- Formed: 1972
- Preceding agencies: Office of Entomologist, Agricultural Section, U.S. Patent Office; Treasury Cattle Commission; Federal Horticultural Board
- Jurisdiction: Federal government of the United States
- Headquarters: 4700 River Road, Riverdale, Md 20737
- Motto: Healthy and profitable American agriculture provides food and clothing for countless people worldwide and is a key pillar of our economy
- Employees: 8,000
- Annual budget: $2.015 billion FY2021
- Agency executive: Michael Watson (since 2023), Administrator
- Parent department: United States Department of Agriculture
- Child agencies: Animal Care (AC); Biotechnology Regulatory Services (BRS); International Services and Trade Support Team (IS); Plant Protection and Quarantine (PPQ); Veterinary Services (VS); Wildlife Services (WS); Beagle Brigade; Investigative and Enforcement Services (IES)
- Website: aphis.usda.gov

The Animal and Plant Health Inspection Service (APHIS) is an agency of the United States Department of Agriculture (USDA) based in Riverdale, Maryland, responsible for protecting animal health, animal welfare, and plant health. APHIS is the lead agency for collaboration with other agencies to protect U.S. agriculture from invasive pests and diseases. APHIS's PPQ is the National Plant Protection Organization for the U.S., and the agency's head of veterinary services/veterinary deputy administrator is the chief veterinary officer of the United States.

== History ==
APHIS was created in 1972 by Secretary's Memorandum No. 1769.

The origins of the agency predate creation of the USDA, to 1854 when the Office of Entomologist, Agricultural Section, U.S. Patent Office was created. It was the first of three agencies that eventually were merged to form APHIS. In 1881, a Cattle Commission was created in the Department of the Treasury that three years later was transferred to USDA. Plant quarantine functions followed in 1912 when USDA's Federal Horticultural Board was created. Between the 1880s and 1930s, these evolved into the USDA Bureaus of Entomology, of Animal Industry, and of Plant Quarantine, respectively.

In 1953, those three bureaus were made into the new Agricultural Research Service. In 1971, the animal and plant regulatory functions were separated from ARS to create a new entity known as Animal and Plant Health Services. In 1972, the meat and poultry inspection divisions of the Consumer and Marketing Service (later known as the Agricultural Marketing Service) were added to APHS, thus creating the contemporary APHIS.

In 2003, many APHIS agricultural border inspectors were transferred to U.S. Customs and Border Protection, a unit of the newly created U.S. Department of Homeland Security.

APHIS is the primary agency responsible for responding to animal and plant disease(s) and pest emergencies as well as to other emergencies as set forth by the National Response Plan (NRP) completed in 2005 (APHIS Strategic Plan 2003–2008).

APHIS celebrated its 50th anniversary on April 2, 2022.

== Duties and responsibilities ==
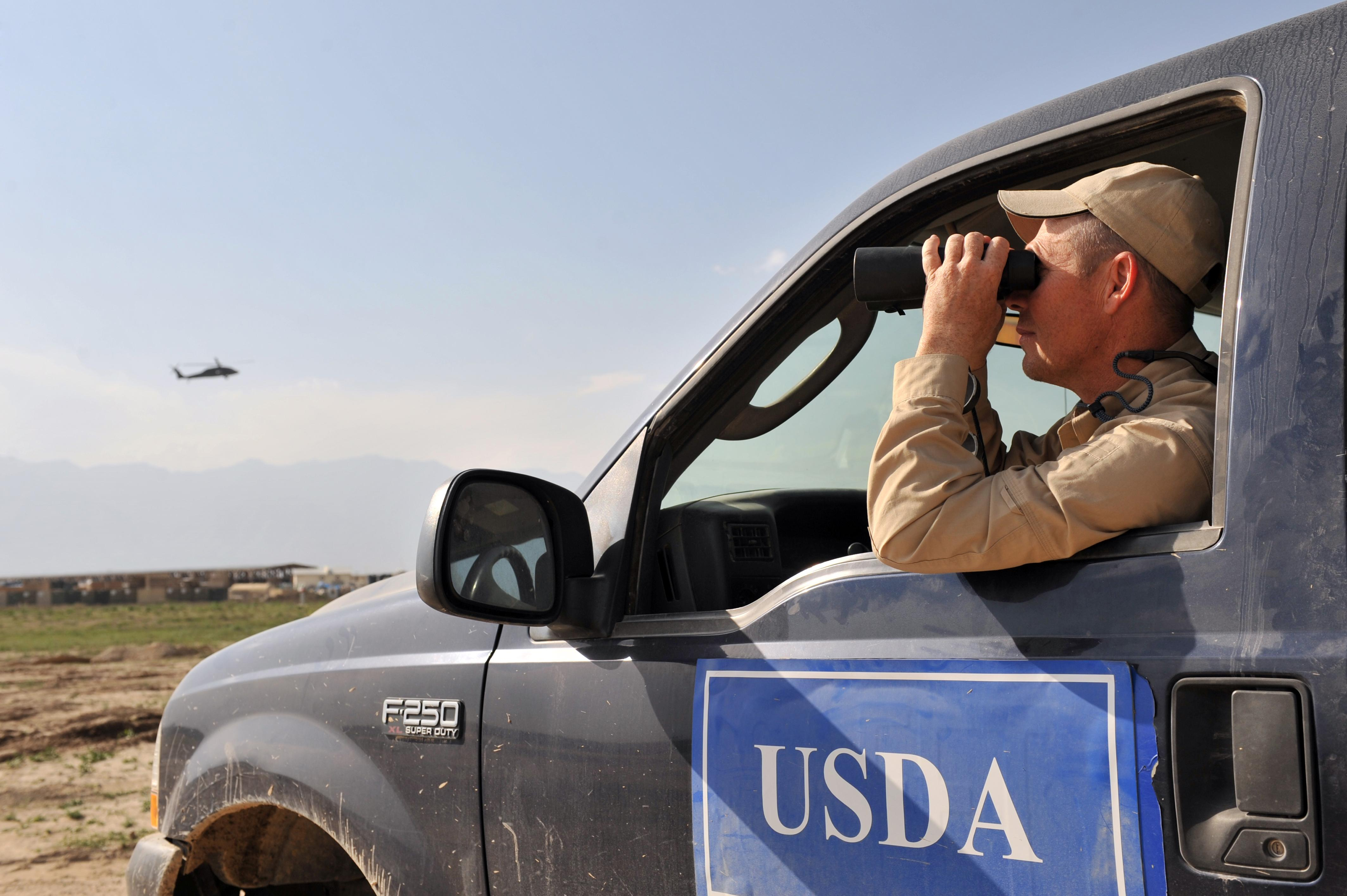
APHIS agent assesses the airfield for birds at Bagram Airfield, Afghanistan.

The originally-stated purpose of APHIS is to "protect the animal and plant resources of the nation" and carry out "a poultry and meat inspection program." A more modern articulation of APHIS's mission is "protecting and promoting U.S. agricultural health, regulating genetically engineered organisms, administering the Animal Welfare Act and carrying out wildlife damage management activities."

APHIS aims to protect American animals, plants, and the agricultural industry by offering:

- Protection from invasive non-native plants, animals, insects, and diseases
- Monitoring and management of existing agricultural pests and diseases
- Resolution and management of trade issues related to animal or plant health
- Prevention or cessation of the inhumane treatment (of animals)

The threats and challenges within APHIS' scope include:

- Non-compliant biotech events
- Invasive species
- Agricultural animal/plant health threats
- Agricultural bioterrorism
- Sanitary and phytosanitary trade barriers
- Wildlife conflicts and diseases
- Zoonotic diseases
- Animal welfare issues

=== Statutory authorities ===
APHIS is granted specific authority under several federal statutes:

Animal Health Protection Act, 7 U.S.C. § 8301 et seq. Governs the prevention, detection, control, and eradication of diseases and pests of animals, where "animal" is defined as "any member of the animal kingdom (except a human)." 7 U.S.C. § 8302 (1) (West 2009).

Animal Welfare Act of 1966, 7 U.S.C. § 2131 et seq. Originally intended to prevent the theft of pets for sale to research facilities, the AWA now broadly regulates minimum standards of care and treatment of animals in research, exhibition, transport, and by dealers. It exempts birds, rats, or mice bred for use in research, horses not used for research, cold blooded animals, and all farm animals used in the production of "food and fiber." It provides for licensing and registration of all animal dealers and exhibitors.

Horse Protection Act, 15 U.S.C. §§ 1821–1831 Prohibits horses subjected to a process called "soring" (injecting or applying chemicals to a horse's forelegs to accentuate its gait) from participating in and being transported to exhibitions, sales, shows, or auctions.

Animal Damage Control Act of March 2, 1931, 7 U.S.C. §§ 426–426c Provides broad authority for investigation, demonstrations and control of "injurious animal species" (mammalian predators, rodents and birds.) Amended in 1991 to prevent the inadvertent introduction of brown tree snakes into other areas of the United States from Guam.

Lacey Act, 16 U.S.C. §§ 3371–3378 Makes it unlawful for any person to import, export, transport, sell, receive, acquire, or purchase any fish or wildlife or plant taken, possessed, transported, or sold in violation of any law, treaty, or regulation of the United States or in violation of any Indian tribal law whether in interstate or foreign commerce.

Plant Protection Act, 7 U.S.C. § 7701 et seq. Consolidates all or part of ten existing USDA plant health laws into one comprehensive law. Gives USDA the authority to regulate and to prohibit or restrict the importation, exportation, and the interstate movement of plants, plant products, certain biological control organisms, noxious weeds, and plant pests.

Federal Seed Act, Title III, 7 U.S.C. §§ 1551–1611 Requires accurate labeling and purity standards for seeds in commerce, and prohibits the importation and movement of adulterated or misbranded seeds.

Honeybee Act, 7 U.S.C. §§ 281–286 Prohibits or restricts the importation or entry of honeybees and honeybee semen into or through the United States in order to prevent the introduction and spread of diseases and parasites harmful to honeybees, as well as genetically undesirable germ plasm and undesirable bee species.

Animal quarantine laws: 21 U.S.C. § 101 allows the President, by proclamation, to suspend the importation of all or any class of animals for a limited time, whenever, in his opinion, it is necessary for the protection of animals in the United States against infectious or contagious diseases.

21 U.S.C. § 113a authorizes the Secretary of Agriculture to establish research facilities for hoof and mouth disease and other animal diseases which "in the opinion of the Secretary" constitute a threat to U.S. livestock. Mandates strict controls for the use of any live virus at such research facilities. Permits the Secretary to hire up to five technical experts or scientists at a maximum paygrade of GS-18. (This appears to be one of the most prescriptive statutes that USDA administers.)

21 U.S.C. § 114i authorizes the Secretary of Agriculture to establish and carry out a program for the eradication of pseudorabies in United States swine populations.

Virus-Serum-Toxin Act, 21 U.S.C. §§ 151–158

== Organization ==
APHIS is divided into six operational programs units:

- Animal Care (AC): Determines and promotes standards of humane care and treatment of animals through inspections and educational efforts.
- Biotechnology Regulatory Services (BRS): Protects agricultural and natural resources by ensuring safe development of genetically engineered organisms using a science-based regulatory framework.
- International Services and Trade Support Team (IS): Provides international animal and plant health expertise to safeguard American agricultural health and promote U.S. agricultural trade.
- Plant Protection and Quarantine (PPQ): Safeguards agriculture and natural resources from risks associated with the entry, establishment, or spread of pests and noxious weeds.
- Veterinary Services (VS): Protects and improves the health, quality, and marketability of our nation's animals, animal products, and veterinary biologics by preventing, controlling, and/or eliminating animal diseases, and monitoring, and promoting animal health and productivity.
- Wildlife Services (WS): Provides leadership to resolve wildlife conflicts and create a balance allowing people and wildlife to peacefully coexist.

APHIS is also divided into three management support units (Legislative and Public Affairs, Marketing and Regulatory Programs Business Services, and Policy and Program Development), and two offices that support government-wide initiatives: the Office of Emergency Management and Homeland Security and Office of Civil Rights Enforcement and Compliance.

One of the past APHIS Administrators, Kevin Shea, was appointed in June 2013. His immediate predecessor, Dr. Greg Parham, was appointed in April 2011.

The Deputy Administrator for Veterinary Services also functions as Chief Veterinary Officer of the United States, and represents the U.S. Government at the World Organisation for Animal Health (OIE). APHIS Plant Protection and Quarantine (PPQ) is the National Plant Protection Organization; the Deputy Administrator for PPQ represents the United States in the North American Plant Protection Organization and other international fora related to plant health and quarantine.

In addition to its domestic operations, APHIS International Services staff several overseas offices, including veterinary and plant health attachés in U.S. diplomatic missions as well as technicians carrying out disease and pest eradication and control programs.

On February 26, 2022 Deputy Administrator Osama El-Lissy left to become the Secretary of the International Plant Protection Convention.

=== Investigative and Enforcement Services ===
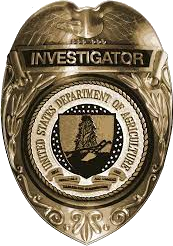
APHIS IES badge

As the name suggests, IES takes referrals from other APHIS personnel as to investigations and enforcements that are needed based on personnel's observations in the course of their duties.

== Budget ==
APHIS has a budget of approximately $800 million annually and employs about 7,000 people, about 5,000 of which are deployed as inspectors at ports, borders and on farms.

== Criticism ==
In 2005, the USDA OIG published a report which identified numerous failures on the part of APHIS' Animal Care (AC) unit to adequately enforce the AWA, including:

- failure of AC's Eastern Region to aggressively pursue "enforcement actions against violators of the AWA";
- failure to fine violators sufficiently, creating a climate in which "violators consider the monetary stipulation as a normal cost of conducting business rather than a deterrent for violating the law";
- failure on the part of the USDA's Veterinary Medical Officers (VMOs) to ensure that research facilities provided them with basic data on themselves such as "the number of animals used in research" and the number of "unexpected animal deaths";
- failure on the part of Institutional Animal Care and Use Committees (IACUC) to effectively monitor animal care activities, in particular, veterinary care and review of painful procedures; and
- failure on the part of Institutional Animal Care and Use Committees (IACUC) to ensure the use of non-animal methodologies where such research avenues exist.

The OIG audit further reported that at almost one-third of facilities, IACUCs failed to ensure that principal investigators (PIs) considered alternatives to painful procedures; the report cites this failure on the part of IACUCs as being the most frequent AWA violation at animal research facilities.

In 2014, The USDA's Office of the Inspector General (OIG) criticized the Service for a number of issues including its failure to efficiently allocate resources and its failure to administer appropriate fines for animal welfare violations among other issues. The report found the Service conducted inspections at facilities that did not have any animals regulated under the Animal Welfare Act (AWA). According to the report, "[Animal Care] did not make the best use of its limited resources, which could have been assigned to inspect other more problematic facilities, including breeders, dealers, and exhibitors." The Service was also criticized for prematurely closing cases that involved "grave (e.g., animal deaths) or repeat welfare violations." When the service did levy fines against institutions for AWA violations, the Inspector General's report found "penalties that were reduced by an average of 86 percent from... authorized maximum penalty per violation. Consequently, 26 of the 30 violators in our sample received" and that the Service "grant[ed] good faith reductions without merit or us[ed] a smaller number of violations than the actual number." According to the USDA's report, APHIS agreed with the findings and will begin implanting reforms.

On 4 February 2017, the USDA Animal Care Search Tool, a searchable database containing documents with details about the animals held by individual US animal research facility together with inspection and action reports, was removed from public access, with a stated reason of protecting personal information. The removal affects inspection reports, research facility annual reports, regulatory correspondence (such as official warnings), and certain enforcement records. Information from these documents can now only be requested via a Freedom of Information Act inquiry. This removal has been criticized as substantially limiting information on animal care in US institutions, and of inhibiting access to what is still available.

== See also ==
- Title 7 of the Code of Federal Regulations
- Title 9 of the Code of Federal Regulations
- Beagle Brigade
- Phytosanitary Certificate Issuance and Tracking System
- Plant Protection and Quarantine
- Sanitary and phytosanitary measures and agreements
- Uniform methods and rules
