= Finnish Food Authority =

Finnish government agency

- Ruokavirasto; Livsmedelsverket

Agency overview
- Formed: 2019
- Preceding agencies: Finnish Food Safety Authority (2006–2018); Agency for Rural Affairs (2007–2018); National Land Survey of Finland's IT Service Centre (2015–2018)
- Jurisdiction: Government of Finland
- Headquarters: Alvar Aallon katu 5, 60100 Seinäjoki, Finland
- Employees: 1,066 (2023)
- Annual budget: €2.1 billion (2023)
- Agency executive: Leena Räsänen, Director General
- Website: ruokavirasto.fi

Finnish Food Authority (Finnish: Ruokavirasto, Swedish: Livsmedelsverket) is a government agency in Finland. It was established at the beginning of 2019 through the merger of the Finnish Food Safety Authority, the Agency for Rural Affairs, and part of the National Land Survey of Finland's IT Service Centre. The agency's Director General is Dr. Leena Räsänen, a Doctor of Veterinary Medicine.

The Finnish Food Authority's main office is located in Seinäjoki, which was also the headquarters of its predecessor, the Agency for Rural Affairs.

== History ==
The Finnish Food Authority began operations in early 2019. Its establishment aimed to enhance the effectiveness, customer focus, and cost efficiency of the oversight of the agriculture and food chain. The consolidation also sought to clarify the division of responsibilities among authorities, standardize inspection systems, and modernize operational methods and administrative culture. A key goal was to unify the sector's information systems and improve digital services.

The office of the Food Market Ombudsman was also established under the Finnish Food Authority. Approximately 1,000 employees started working at the agency, spread across 20 locations. The headquarters was set in Seinäjoki.

During its first year, the agency faced financial challenges, leading to budget cuts and internal restructuring. In October 2019, it initiated cooperation negotiations to balance its finances. However, in November 2019, these negotiations were suspended when the Finnish government allocated an additional €5 million to the agency in a supplementary budget.

== Organization ==
The agency is led by Leena Räsänen and is structured into three main divisions and two operational units.

=== Divisions ===
- Rural Affairs Division – Manages the administration and supervision of support systems and the funding of the Mainland Finland Rural Development Programme.
- Food Chain Division – Oversees food safety, agricultural and forestry production inputs, animal health and welfare, and plant health inspections.
    - Laboratory and Research Division – Handles diagnostics for animal and plant diseases, laboratory research on food, feed, fertilizers, pesticides, and plants, as well as laboratory analytics for monitoring and control samples. It also conducts scientific research and maintains essential national research infrastructure.

==== Operational units ====
- Internal Services Unit – Responsible for personnel and financial matters, facility management, document administration, data protection, legal services, and procurement.
- Digital Services Unit – Oversees IT governance, system development, continuity management, ICT procurement, cybersecurity, and external IT services for the agency's clients.

== Dog register ==
The Finnish Food Authority maintains the Dog Register, which is intended to record all dogs in Finland. The register was launched in May 2023 and was developed by Siili Solutions at a cost of €250,000, with an additional €483,000 spent on maintenance in 2023. The register has been criticized on social media as unnecessary, and by the end of 2023, fewer than one-third of dogs in Finland had been registered.
