= Ernesto Enkerlin =

Mexican conservationist laureated by Unesco

- Born: 14 December 1958 (age 67); Monterrey, N.L., Mexico
- Education: Monterrey Institute of Technology and Higher Education, Texas A&M University
- Awards: Sultan Qaboos Prize for Environmental Preservation (UNESCO, 2005) Kenton Miller Award for Innovation in Protected Areas Conservation (IUCN, 2009)
- Scientific career
- Fields: Conservation biology; Sustainability
- Workplaces: Monterrey Institute of Technology and Higher Education, World Commission on Protected Areas-IUCN, Earth Institute (Columbia University), Organización Vida Silvestre, México
- Doctoral advisor: Jane M. Packard

Ernesto Christian Enkerlin Hoeflich (born 14 December 1958 in Monterrey) is the Director of Science at OVIS (Organizacion Vida SIlvestre). A prominent Mexican conservationist, environmentalist and researcher, he specializes in conservation biology, environmental policy, sustainability and biodiversity stewardship.

== Education ==
Enkerlin holds a Bachelor of Engineering degree in Agronomy and Animal Science from Monterrey Institute of Technology and Higher Education (ITESM, 1980) and a doctorate degree in wildlife and fisheries sciences from Texas A&M University at College Station (1995).

== Career ==
He has worked as a research professor at the Center for Environmental Quality (ITESM) and as an adjunct research scientist for the Center for Environmental Research and Conservation of the Earth Institute at Columbia University, in the United States.

As a conservationist, Enkerlin has worked for several NGOs and co-founded Amigos de la Naturaleza and Pronatura Noreste before joining the National Commission on Protected Areas by presidential appointment. During his tenure, Mexico increased its protected area coverage by almost 50% adding over 8 million hectares in different protected area categories and also became the country in the world with the most international protected area designations which it holds to this date (2015). CONANP incorporated 26 new sites to the World Network of Biosphere Reserves and received recognition for over 125 wetlands of international importance under the Ramsar Convention. Additionally, Mexico incorporated Islands and Protected Areas of the Gulf of California (2005) and Monarch Butterfly Sanctuaries (2009) as natural sites under the World Heritage Convention. Enkerlin was also involved in negotiating and launching the first international agreement on wilderness signed by the governments of Canada, United States and Mexico in November, 2009, Memorandum of Understanding on Cooperation for Wilderness and Protected Areas Conservation and in establishing the first wilderness area in Latin America. Enkerlin coined the concept of "avocado landscape" for the main production regions in Mexico and as part of "The Path to Sustainability" recently adopted by the avocado growers association (2024, APEAM).

Formerly, Enkerlin was the Leader of the Legacy for Sustainability (ITESM); chair, World Commission on Protected Areas (WCPA-IUCN); Scientific President for Pronatura, Mexico's largest conservation NGO; and board member of the Global Institute for Sustainability (ITESM) and Fundación Coca-Cola. He is a retired Professor of Ecology and Sustainability from Monterrey Tech and has been dedicated to his family's sustainable vineyard and winery since 2016. He is the brother of notable Mexican entomologist Walther Enkerlin.

== Awards ==
His efforts at the National Commission on Protected areas of Mexico (CONANP), which he presided from 2001 to 2010, were distinguished with the 2005 Sultan Qaboos Prize for Environmental Preservation by UNESCO and one of the 2009 Distinguished Service Awards by the Society for Conservation Biology. The International Union for Conservation of Nature (IUCN) awarded Enkerlin one of the 2008 Packard Awards and the Kenton Miller Award for Innovation in Protected Areas Conservation in 2009.

== See also ==
List of Monterrey Institute of Technology and Higher Education faculty
