= Caroline King-Okumu =

Climatologist

External videos
- “Interview: Caroline King - Ecosystems and Human Development Association (EHDA)“, Jun 13, 2014
- “CBA9 session interview: Caroline King-Okumu”, Apr 28, 2015, International Institute for Environment and Development (IIED),

Caroline King-Okumu (née King) is an international development opportunities manager for the UK Centre for Ecology and Hydrology. She was formerly a senior researcher for the International Institute for Environment and Development (IIED). Her major areas of research are dryland ecosystems, economic and environmental assessment, and climate change. She is considered an international expert on land and water management, particularly drylands agriculture. King-Okumu is based in Kenya but is involved in research and projects throughout the world.

== Career ==
King-Okumu has worked with the United Nations University (UNU), United Nations Convention to Combat Desertification (UNCCD), and International Center for Agricultural Research in the Dry Areas (ICARDA). She has consulted with the Ecosystems and Human Development Association (EHDA) and has been a Visiting Research Associate at the School of Geography and Environment at the University of Oxford.

Previously, she was a senior researcher in the Climate Change research group of the International Institute for Environment and Development (IIED) Based in London, England, IIED is an international organization engaged in policy and action research to support sustainable local development in countries in Africa, Asia, Latin America, the Middle East and the Pacific.

King-Okumu studied methods for the sustainable integrated management of water and land in dryland ecosystems, and economic and environmental assessment techniques for calculating the costs of groundwater degradation. She encouraged initiatives for decision-making in the context of longer-term considerations of increasing variability and climate change. She worked to develop in-country partnerships engaging government, research institutions, civic groups and the private sector, to support sustainable practices and community-based adaptation and to increase climate change resilience.

King-Okumu analyzes situations in terms of a nexus of interlinked water, energy, and food production concerns rather than focusing solely on water balance and food production. She makes use of a wide variety of techniques ranging from remote sensing for the monitoring of the environment, to in-depth field observation and surveys with local people.

Her research includes examinations of sustainable coastal management in Asia and the Pacific, water management for Egyptian citrus producers west of the Nile Delta, desertification in the Northern Sahara, groundwater degradation in the Western Desert, and the impact of local policies on the management of pastoralist grazing in Isiolo County, Kenya. She has also reported on the effects of conflict in Syria on agriculture in the Orontes Basin.

King-Okumu was involved in the G20 Water Policy Workshop on Safe Drinking Water and Sanitation for All (2004). The report was used to support proposals for a summit meeting of L20 world leaders to discuss safe water.

King-Okumu has worked with Boshra Salem and others on the Sustainable Management of Marginal Drylands (SUMAMAD) project for UNESCO. She presented at The future of drylands (Tunis, Tunisia, 2006), an international conference organized by UNESCO and 20 other organizations as part of the United Nations' International Year of Deserts and Desertification to assess the past 50 years of drylands research and identify priorities for future development.

She has presented at other conferences including the Eleventh International Dryland Development Conference: Global climate change and its impact on food & energy security in the drylands (Beijing, China, 2013) and the International Conference on The Water-Food-Energy Nexus in Drylands (Rabat, Morocco, 2014).

King-Okumu speaks English, French, Arabic and Japanese and is learning Amharic and Swahili.
