= Plant health =

Plant health includes the protection of plants, as well as scientific and regulatory frameworks for controlling plant pests or pathogens. Plant health is concerned with:

- Ecosystem health with a special focus on plants
- Tree health
- The control of plant pests
- The control of plant pathology

== See also ==
- Plant disease forecasting, predicting the occurrence or change in severity of plant diseases
- Animal and Plant Health Inspection Service
- American Phytopathological Society
  - Plant Protection and Quarantine
- Agreement on the Application of Sanitary and Phytosanitary Measures
- Pest risk analysis
- Global Plant Clinic
- Medicinal plants
