= Plant Protection and Quarantine =

US Animal and Plant Health Inspection Service division

Plant Protection and Quarantine (PPQ) is one of six operational program units within the Animal and Plant Health Inspection Service (APHIS) of the United States Department of Agriculture (USDA). The PPQ works to safeguard agriculture and natural resources in the U.S. against the entry, establishment, and spread of animal and plant pests, and noxious weeds in order to help ensure the protection of native flora and an abundant, high-quality, and varied food supply.

== Plant pest program information ==
PPQ collaborates with state departments of agriculture and other government agencies to eradicate, suppress, or contain plant pests. Such collaborations may include emergency or longer-term domestic programs to target a specific pest.

Targeted pests include:

- insects and mites:
  - Asian longhorned beetle (ALB), Anoplophora glabripennis
  - cactus moth, Cactoblastis cactorum
  - celery leaf miner, Liriomyza trifolii
  - cotton pests:
    - boll weevil, Anthonomus grandis
    - pink bollworm, Pectinophora gossypiella
  - box tree moth, Cydalima perspectalis
  - emerald ash borer, Agrilus planipennis
  - European cherry fruit fly, Rhagoletis cerasi
  - European grapevine moth, Lobesia botrana
  - fruit flies of genera in the family Tephritidae, including:
    - genus Anastrepha, especially the Mexican fruit fly
    - genus Bactrocera, notably the Melon fly; PPQ have implemented heightened surveillance measures for the entry of B. invadens
    - genus Ceratitis, particularly the Mediterranean fruit fly
  - grasshoppers
  - spongy moth, Lymantria dispar dispar
  - imported fire ant
  - Japanese beetle, Popillia japonica
  - light brown apple moth (LBAM), Epiphyas postvittana
  - Mormon cricket, Anabrus simplex
  - palmetto weevil, Rhynchophorus cruentatus
  - pine shoot beetle, Tomicus piniperda
  - pink hibiscus mealybug, Maconellicoccus hirsutus
  - Spotted lanternfly, Lycorma delicatula
  - spotted-wing drosophila, Drosophila suzukii
- mollusks:
  - giant African land snails
  - temperate terrestrial gastropods (snails and slugs)
- nematodes:
  - golden nematode, Globodera rostochiensis
  - pale cyst nematode, Globodera pallida
- Plant diseases:
  - black stem rust, caused by Puccinia graminis
  - chrysanthemum white rust, caused by Puccinia horiana
  - Citrus diseases
  - European larch canker
  - Gladiolus rust, caused by Uromyces transversalis
  - Karnal bunt, caused by Tilletia indica
  - plum pox, a viral disease transmitted by aphids
  - potato diseases
  - Ralstonia, a bacterial pathogen
  - soybean rust, caused by Phakopsora pachyrhizi and Phakopsora meibomiae
  - sudden oak death (SOD) caused by Phytophthora ramorum
  - thousand cankers disease, caused by Geosmithia morbida spread by the walnut twig beetle

== Pest detection and identification ==
PPQ aims to support APHIS goals by early detection of pests, weeds and plant diseases harmful to the economy, to allow for an organized response before significant damage is caused.

The National Identification Services (NIS) is responsible for rapid, accurate and precise identification of pests and pathogens intercepted in imported commodities, as well as from domestic interceptions. NIS coordinates reports of plant pest identification, providing a database that may lead to quarantine actions. NIS staff includes National Taxonomists specializing in entomology, malacology, botany and mycology/plant pathology, and collaborates with scientists in complementary specialties at institutions around the country. Diagnostic DNA testing services are also employed.

In the past about 2% of all live plant import allotments were inspected, however that has shown to be inflexible. The likelihood of detection of a problem when using the 2% rule is not homogeneous. The biggest problem is that likelihood of successful detection is correlated with size of allotment - that is to say, an inspected sample of less than 2% is good enough for a larger shipment, while 2% is not good enough for a small shipment. There are also other disparities due to the actual contents of the shipment especially between species of declared material, location of origin, and target pests. As a result, PPQ, APHIS, and phytosanitary authorities in other countries are moving towards a more adaptive inspection thoroughness regime.

== Center for Plant Health Science and Technology ==
The Center for Plant Health Science and Technology (CPHST) is PPQ's scientific support division, providing research and data to make scientifically valid regulatory and policy decisions. The center also develops technology and practical tools for PPQ personnel to conduct pest detection, exclusion and management operations.

The division's project areas include:

- Trade risk analysis and treatment – the potential impact on U.S. agriculture of pests and diseases associated with imported plant products, and treatment of these products to reduce such risks.
- Pest detection – through development of surveillance programs.
- Identification and diagnostics – developing and testing new detection technologies, and accrediting external laboratories in their use.
- Emergency response – providing scientific support during plant health emergencies.
- Harmful plant strategies – implementing existing methods and developing new technologies for the identification, exclusion, eradication, and management of invasive weeds and regulated plants.
- Biological control – developing technologies to allow natural enemies to effectively mitigate the impacts of invasive pests, arthropods, weeds, and plant pathogens.

== Plant import and export ==
PPQ advises on regulations for international and interstate trade with the aim of preventing the introduction of foreign plant pests. This notably includes procedures on the import of live plants, fresh fruits and vegetables, and solid-wood packing material.

Domestic standards are delegated by the National Plant Protection Organization (NPPO) which assumes the responsibilities for ensuring the U.S. export program meets international standards. It provides certification of commodities as a service to U.S. exporters.

The North American Plant Protection Organization (NAPPO), operating between the U.S., Canada and Mexico, was created in 1976 to set Regional Standards for Phytosanitary Measures (RSPM). It depends upon regulators, scientists, producers and industry associations to collaborate in scientific standards to protect agricultural, forest, and other plant resources while facilitating trade.

The International Plant Protection Convention (IPPC), established 1951, is an international plant health agreement that aims to protect cultivated and wild plants by preventing the introduction and spread of pests. This is done through International Standards for Phytosanitary Measures (ISPM).

== Accreditation, Certification, and Network Services ==
The Accreditation, Certification, and Network Services (ACNS) unit manages the National Seed Health System; the U.S. Nursery Certification Program; the U.S. Greenhouse Certification Program; the State National Harmonization Program for seed potatoes; Special Foreign Inspection and Certification programs; Plants in Growing Media; Postentry Quarantine, Audit-based Certification Systems pertaining to section 10201(d)(1) of the Farm Bill; and the National Clean Plant Network pertaining to section 10202 of the Farm Bill.

== Identification Technology Program ==
ITP produces images, videos, identification keys, tools, and molecular diagnostics supporting PPQ's activities.

== See also ==
- Food security
- Sanitary and phytosanitary measures and agreements

== Sources ==
- USDA APHIS | About APHIS
- USDA APHIS | Plant Health (PPQ) Home Page
- USDA APHIS | Plant Pests and Diseases
- Hot projects
- USDA APHIS | PPQ Science and Technology
- USDA APHIS | Plant Health (PPQ) Home Page
- USDA APHIS | Imports and Exports
- Imports exports plants manual
- USDA APHIS Application Access - Home to PCIT and VEHCS.
- Ippc
- Nappo
- USDA APHIS | Plant Health Permits
- ePermit: eAuthentication
