= Phytosanitary Certificate Issuance and Tracking System =

Animal and Plant Health Inspection Service (APHIS) and Plant Protection and Quarantine (PPQ) are responsible for safeguarding agriculture and natural resources from the risks associated with the entry, establishment, or spread of animal and plant pests and noxious weeds.

The Phytosanitary Certificate Issuance and Tracking (PCIT) system tracks the inspection of agricultural products and certifies compliance with plant health standards of importing countries. This capability provides APHIS/PPQ better security, reporting functions, and monitoring capabilities for exported commodities.

The PCIT also provides a link to the PExD. PExD is a repository of phytosanitary import requirements of U.S. origin commodities to foreign countries. PExD enhances Plant Protection and Quarantine’s (PPQ’s) ability to maintain the export program for United States exporters. PExD will support PPQ’s Phytosanitary Issues Management (PIM) Export Services (ES) with the task of entering export summaries for foreign countries. PExD provides reusable text to facilitate uniform entry of export summaries. PExD also provides PPQ staff, State and County cooperators, and exporters’ easy access to export summaries via direct user queries. PExD interfaces with the Phytosanitary Certificate Issuance & Tracking System (PCIT) application processing. During application processing, users are provided with pertinent export summaries based on the consignee country, applicable commodities, and other data contained in an application.

Phytosanitary Certificate - Certificate patterned after the model certificates of the IPPC [FAO, 1990]. In the U.S., this is an official document (PPQ Form 577) that attests to the phytosanitary condition of commodities and is issued by an Authorized Certification Official.

== See also ==
- Phytosanitary Certification
- USDA
- Plant Protection and Quarantine
