= Common Veterinary Area =

Agreement between Switzerland and the EU

The Common Veterinary Area flows from the Veterinary Agreement annexed to the Bilateral II Agreement between Switzerland and the European Union that has existed since 2009. The Agreement "governs the control of animal diseases, trade in animals and animal products, and the import of these animals and products from third countries".

== Veterinary Agreement ==
Annex 11 (the 'Veterinary Annex') of the bilateral Agreement on trade in agricultural products between Switzerland and the EU is known as the Veterinary Agreement (SUEVA). Border veterinary controls for trade in animals and animal products between Switzerland and the EU were abolished on 1 January 2009. The SUEVA creates the basis for the Common Veterinary Area and governs:

- the Joint Veterinary Committee (JVC);
- the control of animal diseases;
- trade in animals and animal products and the import of these animals and products from third countries;
- the control of certain animal diseases and their notification;
- animal breeding,
- the import of animals and products from third countries,
- trade between Switzerland and the EU in:
  - living animals,
  - their sperm,
  - egg cells,
  - embryos,
  - milk products,
  - dairy products,
  - meat,
  - meat products

== Proposed extension to the United Kingdom ==
Although the UK helped develop EU standards for animal welfare, agricultural and fisheries products, and food safety for many years, in the trade negotiation between the UK and the EU, the UK negotiators rejected the option to continue to do so. The EU–UK Trade and Cooperation Agreement (EU-UK TCA) has no such provision (except in respect of Northern Ireland), and consequently, exports of live animals and food from the UK to the EU are subject to the EU's long-standing controls on import of such products from countries outside the European Economic Area and Switzerland. In a June 2021 report, "a broad coalition of food industry groups, vets, and environmental health professionals" called for a new UK-EU veterinary agreement to avoid a "catastrophic drop" in food exports to the EU. Compared to the same period in 2020, UK food exports to the EU during the first three months of 2021 fell by 47%; for milk and cream, the figure was 90%.

=== Ireland/Northern Ireland Protocol ===
The Northern Ireland Protocol (as it is more usually called) is a section of the UK's Withdrawal Agreement that makes provision for Northern Ireland to have full access to both the EU Single Market and the UK Internal Market. However, goods (notably animals and animal products) being shipped from Great Britain to Northern Ireland are subject to the same non-tariff barriers to trade as for GB shipments to the EU. This de facto Irish Sea border is controversial among Northern Ireland's Unionists, who see it as a stepping stone to Irish reunification against their will. In February 2021, the Financial Times reported that the DUP's Edwin Poots – at the time Northern Ireland's agriculture minister – had written to George Eustice, Secretary of State for Environment, Food and Rural Affairs, to describe the maximum alignment approach as a 'key ask' in reducing the protocol’s impact. 'This could be achieved, for example, by dynamic alignment with relevant parts of the EU acquis and the UK joining the common veterinary area (as in the Swiss/EU arrangement),' he wrote in the letter copied to Scottish and Welsh governments.

=== Animal welfare ===
In March 2021, the Ulster Society for the Prevention of Cruelty to Animals (USPCA) lobby group advocated for the extension of the CVA to the UK because border control delays are stressful to the animals, and the Northern Ireland Protocol (NIP) is the lever to improvements since the UK has left the province within the EU single market. The Union of European Veterinary Practitioners noticed, first, the suggestion of the 'Eurogroup for Animals' to this effect, and second, that in February 2021 European Commission Vice President Maroš Šefčovič said that the "EU would be prepared to look at a bilateral veterinary agreement with the British government" over this issue.

=== Trade friction ===
In late May 2021, Specialty Food Magazine quoted a trade policy advisor at the British Meat Processors Association thus: "The consequences of the EU–UK Trade and Cooperation Agreement and the Northern Ireland Protocol have resulted in an inevitable increase in trade friction, even to trade within the UK... Anything to reduce this friction must be welcomed." The BMPA believes that the only long-term solution for these trade issues will be to reach a veterinary agreement with the EU. "The CVA could be achieved in a way that would not compromise our negotiating position on trade deals with other countries," the BMPA said, "as it would focus on plant and animal health rules rather than food standards."

In June 2021, the BBC reported the concerns of the British Horseracing Authority that "horse racing and breeding in the UK is being hit by rules over exports brought about" by Brexit. "The industry is worth £4.1bn annually to the UK economy and supports tens of thousands of jobs." The issue has seriously affected participation of British horses in EU races and vice versa, as well as permanent exports of bloodstock.
