= Sanitary and phytosanitary measures and agreements =

Sanitary and phytosanitary (SPS) measures are measures to protect humans, animals, and plants from diseases, pests, or contaminants.

== Overview ==
The Agreement on the Application of Sanitary and Phytosanitary Measures is one of the final documents approved at the conclusion of the Uruguay Round of the Multilateral Trade Negotiations. It applies to all sanitary (relating to animals) and phytosanitary (relating to plants) (SPS) measures that may have a direct or indirect impact on international trade. The SPS agreement includes a series of understandings (trade disciplines) on how SPS measures will be established and used by countries when they establish, revise, or apply their domestic laws and regulations.

Countries agree to base their SPS standards on science, and as guidance for their actions, the agreement encourages countries to use standards set by international standard setting organizations. The SPS agreement seeks to ensure that SPS measures will not arbitrarily or unjustifiably discriminate against trade of certain other members nor be used to disguise trade restrictions. In this SPS agreement, countries maintain the sovereign right to provide the level of health protection they deem appropriate, but agree that this right will not be misused for protectionist purposes nor result in unnecessary trade barriers. A rule of equivalency rather than equality applies to the use of SPS measures.

The 2012 classification of non-tariff measures (NTMs) developed by the Multi-Agency Support Team (MAST), a working group of eight international organisations, classifies SPS measures as one of 16 non-tariff measure (NTM) chapters. In this classification, SPS measures are classified as chapter A and defined as "Measures that are applied to protect human or animal life from risks arising from additives, contaminants, toxins or disease-causing organisms in their food; to protect human life from plant- or animal-carried diseases; to protect animal or plant life from pests, diseases, or disease-causing organisms; to prevent or limit other damage to a country from the entry, establishment or spread of pests; and to protect biodiversity".

Examples of SPS are tolerance limits for residues, restricted use of substances, labelling requirements related to food safety, hygienic requirements and quarantine requirements.

== See also ==
- Animal and Plant Health Inspection Service – USDA's Animal, Plant Health Inspectors
- Common Veterinary Area – Agreement between Switzerland and the EU
