= Risk Assessment under the Sanitary and Phytosanitary Agreement =

The Agreement on the Application of Sanitary and Phytosanitary Measures (the "SPS Agreement") governs rules for food safety and animal and plant health standards. The SPS Agreement permits countries to implement measures provided that they are based on science, are applied only to the extent necessary to protect human, animal and plant life or health and do not arbitrarily or unjustifiably discriminate between countries where identical or similar conditions prevail.

== Description ==
A critical feature of the SPS Agreement is that Sanitary and Phytosanitary measures ("SPS measures") must be based on a 'risk assessment'. Article 2.2 of the SPS Agreement requires SPS measures to be maintained with sufficient scientific evidence. Furthermore, SPS measures must be based on appropriate assessments of the risks to human, animal or plant life or health. The risk assessment must, but is not limited to, consider: scientific evidence, relevant processes and production methods, relevant inspection, sampling and testing methods, prevalence of specific diseases or pests, existence of pest or disease free areas, relevant ecological and environmental conditions, and quarantine or other treatment. Exceptionally, Members may adopt provisional measures (not based on a risk assessment) when the relevant scientific evidence is insufficient.

Risk assessment is defined in para4 of Annex A to the SPS agreement: The evaluation of the likelihood of entry, establishment or spread of a pest or disease within the territory of an importing Member according to the sanitary or phytosanitary measures which might be applied, and of the associated potential biological and economic consequences; or the evaluation of the potential for adverse effects on human or animal health arising from the presence of additives, contaminants, toxins or disease-causing organisms in food, beverages or feedstuffs.

Risk assessment represents a quantitative or qualitative estimate of the possible "harmful effect of the intake of or exposure to a substance or activity, determined in accordance with scientifically accepted methodology." The risk to be assessed under article 5.1 must be a specific risk that has "the actual potential for adverse effects on human health in the real world where people live and work and die." This can be contrasted with "risk management", which takes into account the result of the risk assessment in addition to the social values and politics. Risk management seeks to establish the level of risk a particular society is willing to take in relation to the potential harm and the corresponding SPS measure.
