= International Plant Protection Convention =

International treaty on pests & diseases

- Type: agricultural; environmental
- Signed: 6 December 1951
- Location: Rome, Italy
- Effective: 3 April 1952
- Condition: three ratifications
- Signatories: 29
- Parties: 183
- Depositary: Director-General of the Food and Agriculture Organization
- Languages: Arabic, Chinese, English, French, Russian, and Spanish
- Secretary Osama El-Lissy (26 February 2022–)

The International Plant Protection Convention (IPPC) is a 1951 multilateral treaty overseen by the United Nations Food and Agriculture Organization that aims to secure coordinated, effective action to prevent and to control the introduction and spread of pests of plants and plant products. The Convention extends beyond the protection of cultivated plants to the protection of natural flora and plant products. It also takes into consideration both direct and indirect damage by pests, so it includes weeds. IPPC promulgates International Standards for Phytosanitary Measures (ISPMs).

The Convention created a governing body consisting of each party, known as the Commission on Phytosanitary Measures, which oversees the implementation of the convention (see § CPM). As of August 2017, the convention has 183 parties, being 180 United Nations member states and the Cook Islands, Niue, and the European Union. The convention is recognized by the World Trade Organization's (WTO) Agreement on the Application of Sanitary and Phytosanitary Measures (the SPS Agreement) as the only international standard setting body for plant health.

== Goals ==
While the IPPC's primary focus is on plants and plant products moving in international trade, the convention also covers research materials, biological control organisms, germplasm banks, containment facilities, food aid, emergency aid and anything else that can act as a vector for the spread of plant pests – for example, containers, packaging materials, soil, vehicles, vessels and machinery.

The IPPC was created by member countries of the Food and Agriculture Organization (UN FAO). The IPPC places emphasis on three core areas: international standard setting, information exchange and capacity development for the implementation of the IPPC and associated international phytosanitary standards. The Secretariat of the IPPC is housed at FAO headquarters in Rome, Italy, and is responsible for the coordination of core activities under the IPPC work program.

In recent years the Commission of Phytosanitary Measures of the IPPC has developed a strategic framework with the objectives of:

- protecting sustainable agriculture and enhancing global food security through the prevention of pest spread;
- protecting the environment, forests and biodiversity from plant pests;
- facilitating economic and trade development through the promotion of harmonized scientifically based phytosanitary measures, and:
- developing phytosanitary capacity for members to accomplish the preceding three objectives.

By focusing the convention's efforts on these objectives, the Commission on Phytosanitary Measures of the IPPC intends to:

- protect farmers from economically devastating pest and disease outbreaks.
- protect the environment from the loss of species diversity.
- protect ecosystems from the loss of viability and function as a result of pest invasions.
- protect industries and consumers from the costs of pest control or eradication.
- facilitate trade through International Standards that regulate the safe movements of plants and plant products.
- protect livelihoods and food security by preventing the entry and spread of new pests of plants into a country.

== Regional Plant Protection Organizations ==
Under the IPPC are Regional Plant Protection Organizations (RPPO). These are intergovernmental organizations responsible for cooperation in plant protection. There are the following organizations recognized by – and working under – the IPPC:

- Asia and Pacific Plant Protection Commission (APPPC)
- Caribbean Agricultural Health and Food Safety Agency (CAHFSA)
- Andean Community (Comunidad Andina, CAN)
- Plant Health Committee of the Southern Cone (Comité de Sanidad Vegetal del Cono Sur, COSAVE)
- European and Mediterranean Plant Protection Organization (EPPO)
- Inter-African Phytosanitary Council (IAPSC)
- Near East Plant Protection Organization (NEPPO)
- North American Plant Protection Organization (NAPPO)
- International Regional Organization for Agricultural Health (Organismo Internacional Regional de Sanidad Agropecuaria, OIRSA)
- Pacific Plant Protection Organization (PPPO)

Under the IPPC, the role of an RPPO is to:

- function as the coordinating bodies in the areas covered, shall participate in various activities to achieve the objectives of this Convention and, where appropriate, shall gather and disseminate information.
- cooperate with the Secretary in achieving the objectives of the Convention and, where appropriate, cooperate with the Secretary and the Commission in developing international standards.
- hold regular Technical Consultations of representatives of regional plant protection organizations to:
  - promote the development and use of relevant international standards for phytosanitary measures; and
  - encourage inter-regional cooperation in promoting harmonized phytosanitary measures for controlling pests and in preventing their spread and/or introduction.

== International Plant Health Conference ==
The first annual International Plant Health Conference was organized by the FAO and set to be hosted by the Finnish Government in Helsinki 28 June–July 1, 2021. However, on 9 February 2021 it was cancelled due to the ongoing pandemic.

== Commission on Phytosanitary Measures ==
The fifteenth session of the Commission on Phytosanitary Measures (CPM) was held 16 March, 18 March and 1 April 2021 virtually over Zoom.

== ePhyto ==
The IPPC created and administers the ePhyto system, the international electronic phytosanitary certificate standard. ePhyto has been very widely adopted – as of January 2023 three million ePhyto certificates have been exchanged between exporting and importing partner states.

== Activities ==
IPPC convenes consultative committees and forms international standards. This includes standards on food irradiation.

Haack et al., 2014 find the IPPC has been successful in reducing wood boring beetle infestation of wood packaging material in shipments entering the United States.

== See also ==
- Phytosanitary certification
- Phytosanitary Certificate Issuance and Tracking System (PCIT)
- International Year of Plant Health (IYPH)
