= Chemical defense =

Natural anti-predator mechanism

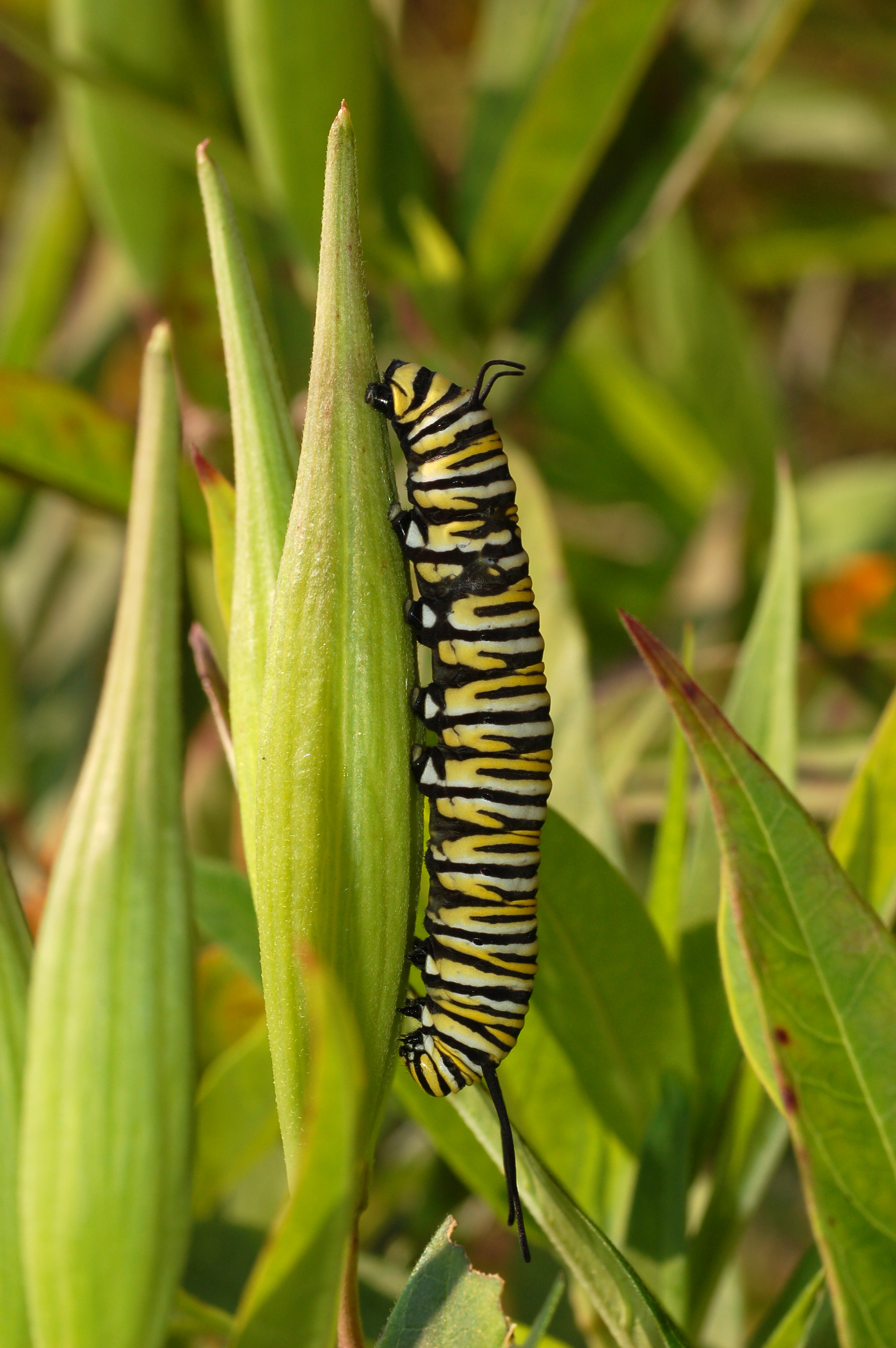
Monarch butterfly caterpillar on milkweed plant. Milkweeds use three primary defenses to limit damage caused by caterpillars: hairs on the leaves, cardenolide toxins, and latex fluids, but Monarchs have evolved in response to remain unaffected by these defenses. Cardenolide toxins sequestered during the Monarch's larval stage from feeding on the plant remains in the adult, making it unpalatable to predators.

Chemical defense is an anti-predator defense strategy employed by many organisms to avoid consumption by other organisms, by producing toxins or irritant metabolites or chemical deterrents that incite avoidance behaviors in the latter. The production of defensive chemicals occurs naturally in plants, fungi and both invertebrate and vertebrate animals, as well as in microorganisms such as bacteria and protists. The class of chemicals produced by organisms that are considered defensive may be considered in a strict sense to only apply to those aiding an organism in escaping herbivory or predation. However, the distinction between types of chemical interaction is subjective and defensive chemicals may also be considered to protect against reduced fitness by pests, parasites and other competitors.

Repellent rather than toxic metabolites are allomones, a sub-category signaling metabolites known as semiochemicals. Many chemicals used for defensive purposes are secondary metabolites derived from primary metabolites which serve a physiological purpose in the organism. Secondary metabolites produced by plants are consumed and sequestered by a variety of arthropods and, in turn, toxins found in some amphibians, reptiles and even pitohui birds can be traced back to arthropod prey. There are a variety of special cases for considering mammalian anti-predator adaptations as chemical defenses as well.

== Prokaryotes and fungi ==
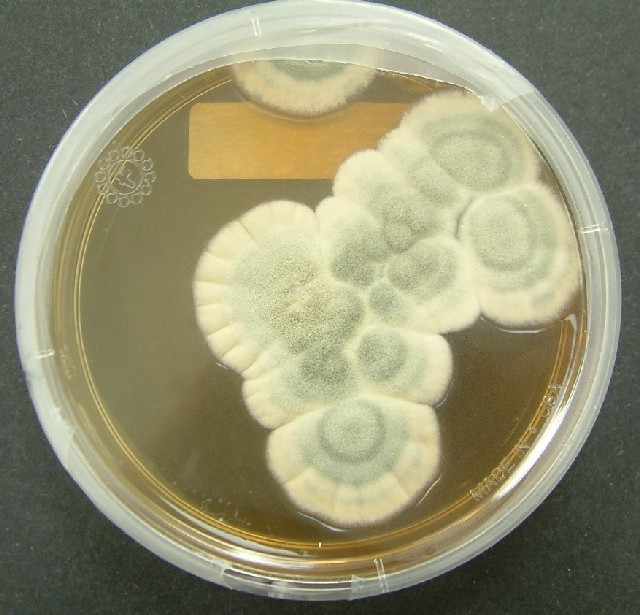
The fungus Penicillium chrysogenum. It produces penicillin, a compound which kills bacteria.

Bacteria of the genera Chromobacterium, Janthinobacterium, and Pseudoalteromonas produce a toxic secondary metabolite, violacein, to deter protozoan predation. Violacein is released when bacteria are consumed, killing the protozoan. Another bacteria, Pseudomonas aeruginosa, aggregates into quorum sensing biofilms which may aid the coordinated release of toxins to protect against predation by protozoans. Flagellates were allowed to grow and were present in a biofilm of P. aeruginosa grown for three days, but no flagellates were detected after seven days. This suggests that concentrated and coordinated release of extracellular toxins by biofilms has a greater effect than unicellular excretions. Bacterial growth is inhibited not only by bacterial toxins, but also by secondary metabolites produced by fungi as well. The most well-known of these, first discovered and published by Alexander Fleming in 1929, described the antibacterial properties of a "mould juice" isolated from Penicillium notatum. He named the substance penicillin, and it became the world's first broad-spectrum antibiotic. Many fungi are either pathogenic saprophytic, or live within plants without harming them as endophytes, and many of these have been documented to produce chemicals with antagonistic effects against a variety of organisms, including fungi, bacteria, and protozoa. Studies of coprophilous fungi have found antifungal agents which reduce the fitness of competing fungi. In addition, sclerotia of Aspergillus flavus contained a number of previously unknown aflavinines which were much more effective at reducing predation by the fungivorous beetle, Carpophilus hemipterus, than aflatoxins which A. flavus also produced and it has been hypothesized that ergot alkaloids, mycotoxins produced by Claviceps purpurea, may have evolved to discourage herbivory of the host plant.

== Lichen ==
Lichens demonstrate chemical defenses similar to those mentioned above. Their defenses act against herbivores and pathogens including bacterial, viral, and fungal varieties. To that end, a variety of chemicals are produced by the lichen's mycobiont via hydrocarbons produced by the lichen's photobiont. However, a single defensive chemical may serve multiple purposes. Usnic acid, for example, is implicated across anti-bacterial, -viral, and -fungal actions. Such defensive chemicals may be stored in various tissue types of the lichen thallus, or they may accumulate on the mycobiont hyphae as extracellular crystals.

Mycobiont-produced acids, including but not limited to, evernic, stictic, and squamatic acids exhibit allelopathy, more specifically, lichen defensive chemicals may inhibit a primary metabolic pathway within competing lichens, mosses, microorganisms, and vascular plants. Documented allelopathic targets include jack pine, white spruce, and garden variety tomato, cabbage, lettuce, and pepper plants. Antimicrobial efforts of lichen are also mediated by various mycobiont-produced acids such as lecanoric and gyrophoric. Similar defensive chemicals were found to inhibit herbivores and insects. Some of these lichen defensive compounds show pharmaceutical potential, too.

In 2004, the death of hundreds of elk near Rawlins, Wyoming was linked to consumption of tumbleweed shield lichen (Xanthoparmelia chlorochroa). Given that such poisoning is very rare though consumption of this lichen is common, this case of poisoning was unusual.

== Plants ==
A wealth of literature exists on the defensive chemistry of secondary metabolites produced by terrestrial plants and their antagonistic effects on pests and pathogens, likely because human society depends upon large-scale agricultural production to sustain global commerce. Since the 1950s, over 200,000 secondary metabolites have been documented in plants. These compounds serve a variety of physiological and allelochemical purposes, and provide a sufficient stock for the evolution of defensive chemicals. Examples of common secondary metabolites used as chemical defenses by plants include alkaloids, phenols, and terpenes. Defensive chemicals used to avoid consumption may be broadly characterized as either toxins or substances reducing the digestive capacity of herbivores. Although toxins are defined in a broad sense as any substance produced by an organism that reduces the fitness of another, in a more specific sense toxins are substances which directly affect and diminish the functioning of certain metabolic pathways. Toxins are minor constituents (<2% dry weight), active in small concentrations, and more present in flowers and young leaves. On the other hand, indigestible compounds make up to 60% dry weight of tissue and are predominately found in mature, woody species. Many alkaloids, pyrethrins, and phenols are toxins. Tannins are major inhibitors of digestion and are polyphenolic compounds with large molecular weights. Lignin and cellulose are important structural elements in plants and are also usually highly indigestible. Tannins are also toxic against pathogenic fungi at natural concentrations in a variety of woody tissues. Not only useful as deterrents to pathogens or consumers, some of the chemicals produced by plants are effective in inhibiting competitors as well. Two separate shrub communities in the California chaparral were found to produce phenolic compounds and volatile terpenes which accumulated in soil and prevented various herbs from growing near the shrubs. Other plants were only observed to grow when fire removed shrubs, but herbs subsequently died off after shrubs returned. Although the focus has been on broad-scale patterns in terrestrial plants, Paul and Fenical in 1986 demonstrated a variety of secondary metabolites in marine algae which prevented feeding or induced mortality in bacteria, fungi, echinoderms, fishes, and gastropods. In nature, pests are a severe problem to plant communities as well, leading to the co-evolution of plant chemical defenses and herbivore metabolic strategies to detoxify their plant food. A variety of invertebrates consume plants, but insects have received a majority of the attention. Insects are pervasive agricultural pests and sometimes occur in such high densities that they can strip fields of crops.

== Animals ==
=== Terrestrial arthropods ===
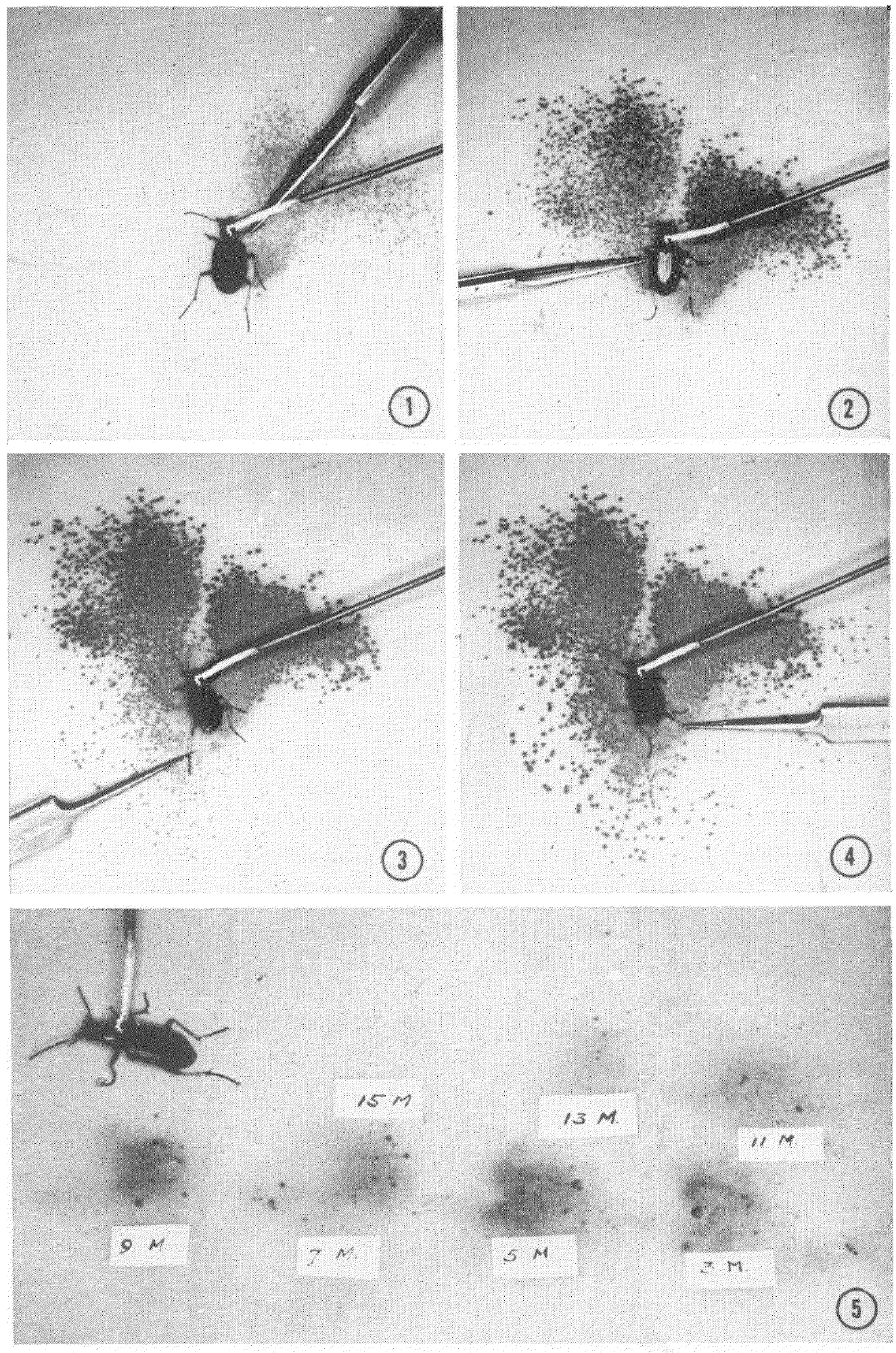
Series from a study by Eisner and colleagues investigating defensive spray in bombardier beetles. The paper is specially treated to have a color reaction with the spray, which is normally clear.

There are many strategies terrestrial arthropods employ in terms of chemical defense. The first of these strategies include the direct use of secondary metabolites. Many insects are distasteful to predators and excrete irritants or secrete poisonous compounds that cause illness or death when ingested. Secondary metabolites obtained from plant food may also be sequestered by insects and used in the production of their own toxins. One of the more well-known examples of this is the monarch butterfly, which sequesters poison obtained from the milkweed plant. Among the most successful insect orders employing this strategy are beetles (Coleoptera), grasshoppers (Orthoptera), and moths and butterflies (Lepidoptera). Insects also biosynthesize unique toxins, and while sequestration of toxins from food sources is claimed to be the energetically favorable strategy, this has been contested. Passion-vine associated butterflies in the tribe Heliconiini (sub-family Heliconiinae) either sequester or synthesize de novo defensive chemicals, but moths in the genus Zygaena (family Zygaenidae) have evolved the ability to either synthesize or sequester their defensive chemicals through convergence. Some coleopterans sequester secondary metabolites to be used as defensive chemicals but most biosynthesize their own de novo. Anatomical structures have developed to store these substances, and some are circulated in the hemolymph and released associated with a behavior called reflex bleeding.

The use of chemical alarms and detection is another strategy of chemical defense. Identifying predators and responding swiftly and appropriately is advantageous and leads to higher fitness. These defensive responses can include (but are not limited to) avoidance and escape responses, safeguarding offspring, aggressive behaviors, and applying "direct defenses" (i.e. toxins or defensive chemicals similar to the strategy of the monarch butterfly discussed above). For example, the fruit fly (Rhagoletis basiola) can chemically detect a nearby parasitoid (an organism that acts as both a parasite and a predator) and halt its egg-laying. Delaying oviposition can reduce the risk of predation and falls under the category of protecting offspring. The spider mite (Tetranychus urticae) can respond to predator volatiles in the environment and will choose to feed in areas without predator cues. Similarly, spider mites are also able to sense damaged body parts of individuals of the same species, or conspecifics, and present the same avoidance behavior as with predator cues. Furthermore, spider mites exhibit a similar behavior with egg-laying as the fruit fly and will elect to move to areas absent of predator cues before oviposition. Spider mites will not avoid areas with other, non-predator volatiles meaning these organisms are able to chemically distinguish threats from non-threats. Parasitic wasps (Aphidius uzbekistanicus) also sense volatiles of their predator, a hyperparasitoid (a parasite whose host is another parasite), and fly to new areas devoid of the chemical cues, displaying similar avoidance behaviors as the spider mite.

Alternately, chemical detection of predators or threats can instigate aggressive behaviors in some terrestrial arthropods, rather than escape and avoidance behaviors. Polybia paulista, a vespid wasp, is a social species that forage and defend according to complex social structures. These wasps have evolved to detect pheromones in the venom of members of the same species. Identifying volatiles from the venom of conspecifics allows the vespid wasps to discern a nearby threat. When detected, these pheromones induce an attacking behavior within members of the same species. These wasps will then work together to defeat the threat. Similarly, honeybees (Apis mellifera scutellata) release a warning pheromone when threatened. These pheromones intensify the honeybees' defenses by increasing the duration of the stinging behavior in all nearby honeybees.

Aphids, small insects that can be found feeding on the sap of plants, exhibit many strategies in terms of chemical defense. Aphids have structures called cornicles along the posterior side of their abdomen which are used to deliver secretions containing both volatile and nonvolatile compounds. Volatile compounds serve primarily as alarm pheromones. Pheromones are chemicals released from one individual that elicit a response from another. Nonvolatile compounds, such as wax, are used as noxious adhesives that the aphid will smear on their enemies. These smears are used to fatally bind predators' mouthparts, antennas, legs, etc., meaning these compounds are typically used more for physical defense rather than chemical. Pea aphids (Acyrthosiphon pisum) produce a warning chemical called (E)-β-farnesene which is excreted as a volatile compound in the presence of predators or perceived threats. In many cases, the aphid will respond by leaving the feeding site in search of an area without alarm pheromones. Additionally, pea aphids are highly attune to which predators are in their area as they can chemically identify what is posing as a threat and adjust their response accordingly. For example, pea aphids can identify Adalia bipunctata, the ladybird beetle, by their chemical predator cues. After sensing this predator, pea aphids are known to produce more offspring with wings. The winged offspring are able to better avoid predation; however, winged individuals are less fertile. This trade-off between wings and fertility shows the success of this particular defensive strategy. In "relaxed" conditions, or conditions in which predator cues are absent, more wing-less offspring are produced.

The structure of (E)-β-farnesene. This is used by many aphid species as an alarm pheromone.

The chemical defense systems of aphids are highly specific. (E)-β-farnesene, the alarm pheromone discussed above, is used by many species of aphids. When released, (E)-β-farnesene will only extend 2-3 centimeters in diameter. This protects farther conspecifics from the alarm chemical so they do not experience any needless pause in feeding or respond unnecessarily. Furthermore, these chemical alarms are detected by structures on the antennae of aphids that utilize specialized binding proteins. Warning chemicals must accumulate to a certain minimum within the binding proteins before a response is produced. These factors are used to highlight the specificity of the chemical defense systems of aphids. Moreover, the chemical warnings used are also highly specific and the method in which the alarm pheromone is distributed can elicit different responses. For example, Ceratovacuna lanigera, the sugarcane wooly aphid, has two methods of distribution of alarm pheromones. When threatened, the alarm pheromones can either be released as a droplet or as a smear. When the alarm is released as a droplet from the aphid's cornicle, the local conspecifics will respond individually and will either avoid or escape the area. However, when alarm pheromones are spread on a predator, other members of the same species will launch a joint attack. As discussed above, waxy cornicle smears are typically used to physically defend an aphid from a predator. In this case, however, the chemical alarms in the wax are eliciting a behavioral change; therefore, this particular strategy can be considered chemical defense.

Other organisms have been able to take advantage of the elaborate chemical defenses of aphids to increase their own fitness. Chemical mimicry is powerful tool in terms of chemical defense. Lysiphlebus fabarum, a parasitoid of aphids, is able to mimic the chemical secretions of specific aphids when infiltrating their colonies. This mimicry serves as a "chemical camouflage" and protects these parasitoids as they go undetected within aphid colonies. Chrysopa glossonae, a lacewing, uses the wax of the woolly alder aphid to chemically disguise itself from formicine ants (of the sub-family Formicinea) who have learned to avoid attacking the aphid. This means that nearby formicine ants will ignore the lacewing as it would the wooly alder aphid. This is another instance where waxy secretions are used for chemical defense rather than physical.

=== Marine invertebrates ===
Marine invertebrates employ a diverse array of strategies in terms of chemical defense. Some of these strategies include: secondary metabolite production, storage and modification of another organism's secondary metabolites, chemical warnings, predator warnings, phagomimicry, and chemical "clothing." The success of these strategies is exemplified by the number of species who exhibit these chemical defenses.

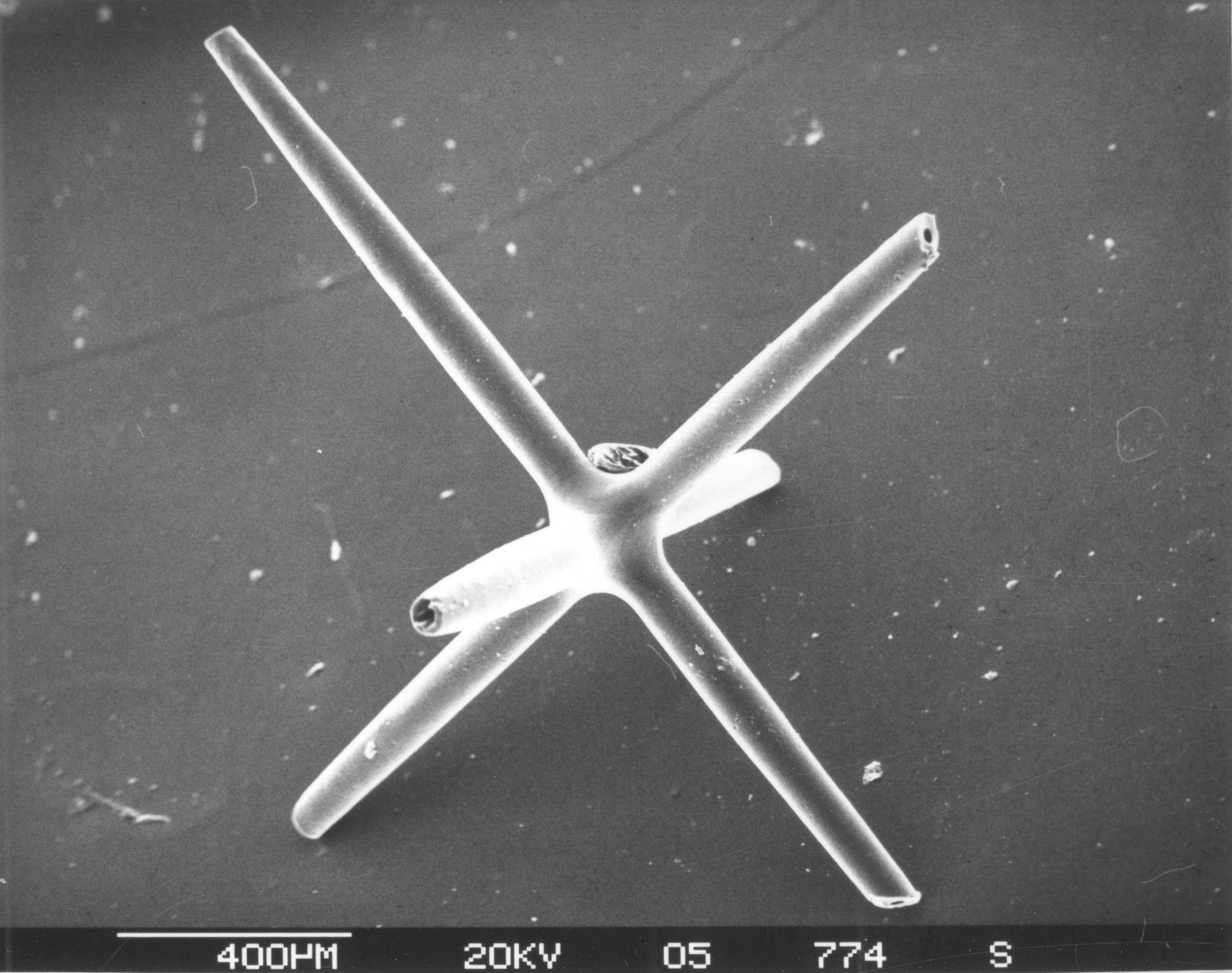
A spicule found on the surface of a sponge. Sponges who produce more secondary metabolites produce fewer spicules.

Sea sponges, of the phylum Porifera, are just one example of marine invertebrates who benefit from the production of secondary metabolites. Sponges have the ability to produce their own secondary metabolites rather than rely on the storage and modification of another organism's chemical defenses. The roles of some observed secondary metabolites are still unknown; however, there is evidence highlighting the fact that a large number of secondary metabolites are used for defensive purposes. For example, there is an inverse relationship between the quantity of secondary metabolites within a sponge and the number of spicules present on the organism itself. Spicules are sharp, needle-like structures protruding from the sponge and are used as a form of physical defense. Secondary metabolites and spicules have an inverse relationship because, as the quantity of secondary metabolites increase, the number of spicules decrease. This leads to the idea that secondary metabolites are indeed used for defensive purposes and sponges no longer have to rely on physical defenses. Additionally, many sponges that produce secondary metabolites are toxic to potential predators. Sponges that exhibit a larger production of secondary metabolites experience less predation, aiding in the idea that secondary metabolites are used as a defensive mechanism.

Secondary metabolite storage and modification is a useful strategy for many marine invertebrates. They are able to sequester preexisting chemicals without needing to spend the energy producing the secondary metabolites themselves. For example, Nudibranchs, also known as sea slugs, exhibit both a "passive" and an "active" form of chemical defense. Sea slugs are carnivorous and a central part of their diet consists of sea sponges who, as discussed above, produce their own defensive secondary metabolites. A key feature of sea slugs' chemical defense is their ability to store and reuse the chemicals produced by the organisms they consume. For instance, a sea sponge produces pigments which gives them their vibrant colors. The pigments in the sponges accumulate in the sea slugs as they feed, allowing the sea slug to be camouflaged within its environment. The color of the sea slug is dependent on which sponge they consume. For example, a sea slug that appears pink when found feeding on a pink sponge can turn green when migrating to a green sponge. This camouflage can be regarded as an "accidental" or passive form of chemical defense. A more active form of chemical defense found in sea slugs is their ability to store and use the defensive secondary metabolites produced by sponges. Sea slugs exhibit two mechanisms of storing defensive chemicals. The first of these mechanisms is storing the chemicals within their dorsum (or "backside"). This storage mechanism is advantageous because the defensive chemicals are located near the surface of the sea slug and are readily available for any mucus secretion. The second mechanism of defensive chemical storage exhibited by sea slugs is preserving the secondary metabolites in other areas of their body. For example, some sea slugs store secondary metabolites within their digestive track. Sea slugs who use this strategy for secondary metabolite storage have mechanisms of deploying the defensive chemicals when needed. Sea slugs are phylogenetically related to sea snails. One of the most distinguishing factors between these two marine invertebrates is sea snails have a shell while sea slugs do not. This loss of shell provides insight to the success of the sea slug's chemical defensive strategies. With the use of defensive chemicals, shells are unnecessary and energetically expensive, leading to the loss of these protective structures. The fact that sea slugs can effectively survive and evade predation without the use of the shell highlights the success of storing and modifying secondary metabolites as a defensive mechanism.

The use of chemical warnings and alarms as a defensive mechanism is employed by many marine invertebrates. This mechanism relies on the invertebrates releasing and sensing chemical cues throughout their aquatic environment and modifying their behavior as a result. For example, clams have evolved to sense predator pheromones in the surrounding water and respond in a way that hides their presence from those predators. Clams, referring to many species of mollusks, feed by pumping. "Pumping" occurs when clams pull surrounding water in, feed on microorganisms present in the water, and release the newly filtered water. Predators of clams, namely blue shell crabs and whelks, are able to identify their prey by sensing the chemical cues present in the filtered water. Clams have evolved to chemically sense upstream predators. When a predator is sensed nearby, clams modify their behavior and discontinue their pumping to reduce consumer cues. Predators no longer have a chemical trail to follow when searching for the clam. Clams only restart their pumping when consumer cues are absent. In this scenario, both predator and prey are relying on the presence of secondary metabolites, predators are using these chemicals as a hunting mechanism while the clams are using them as an alarm that elicits their behavioral response. Blue shell crabs (Callinectes sapidus), a common predator of clams, have a similar mechanism of defense; however, instead of chemically sensing predators in the local environment, they are able to sense chemical warnings emitted by members of the same species. These crabs, when harmed, emanate a chemical warning that is species specific, meaning these chemical warnings are only detected by other blue shell crabs. These warnings can come from damaged whole crabs or body parts of the blue shell crabs. These chemical signals warn others to avoid areas of high risk. The use of chemical warnings and alarm pheromones is a mechanism used by many marine invertebrates, clams and blue shell crabs are only two examples of this defensive strategy.

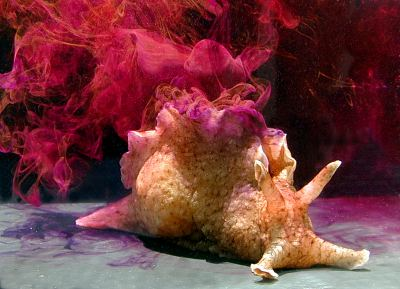
Sea hares employ phagomimicry as a form of chemical defense.

Sea hares use a form of chemical defense called phagomimicry. Unlike the widespread use of the previously discussed chemical defensive strategies, phagomimicry is specific to sea hares. Phagomimicry, as the name suggests, is a type of chemical mimicry. Many organisms have evolved to use mimicry as it is a highly successful mechanism of chemical defense. Sea hares, when attacked, quickly release a fog of chemicals into the surrounding environment. The chemical cloud consists of two main parts: the ink and the opaline. The ink, when released into the water, physically obscures the sea hare from their predator. The opaline fog is a mixture of chemicals that mimic the signals of the predator's food and therefore acts as a food stimulus. The goal of the opaline chemical cloud is to supply a stronger food stimulus than the sea hare itself provides. Altogether, the cloud works to overwhelm and distract the predator. Confused, the predator will attack the chemical mixture rather than the sea hare itself, allowing time for the sea hare to escape.

Several marine invertebrates are able to acquire chemical defense by covering themselves in other organisms who possess defensive secondary metabolites. This defensive mechanism is described as "chemical clothing." Invertebrates have been observed using many different organisms as a form of clothing. These include sponges, bacteria, and seaweed. Interestingly, many marine invertebrates who capitalize on this mechanism of defense are herbivores. These herbivores choose to use seaweed as clothing rather than food, meaning they value the seaweed more for their defensive abilities rather than as potential food. In the field, invertebrates such as the Atlantic decorator crab (Libinia dubia) experience significantly less predation when "clothed" in noxious seaweed than their unclothed conspecifics. The marine invertebrate and the chemically defended organism are able to form a symbiotic relationship resulting in the marine invertebrate acquiring long-term chemical defenses.

=== Vertebrates ===
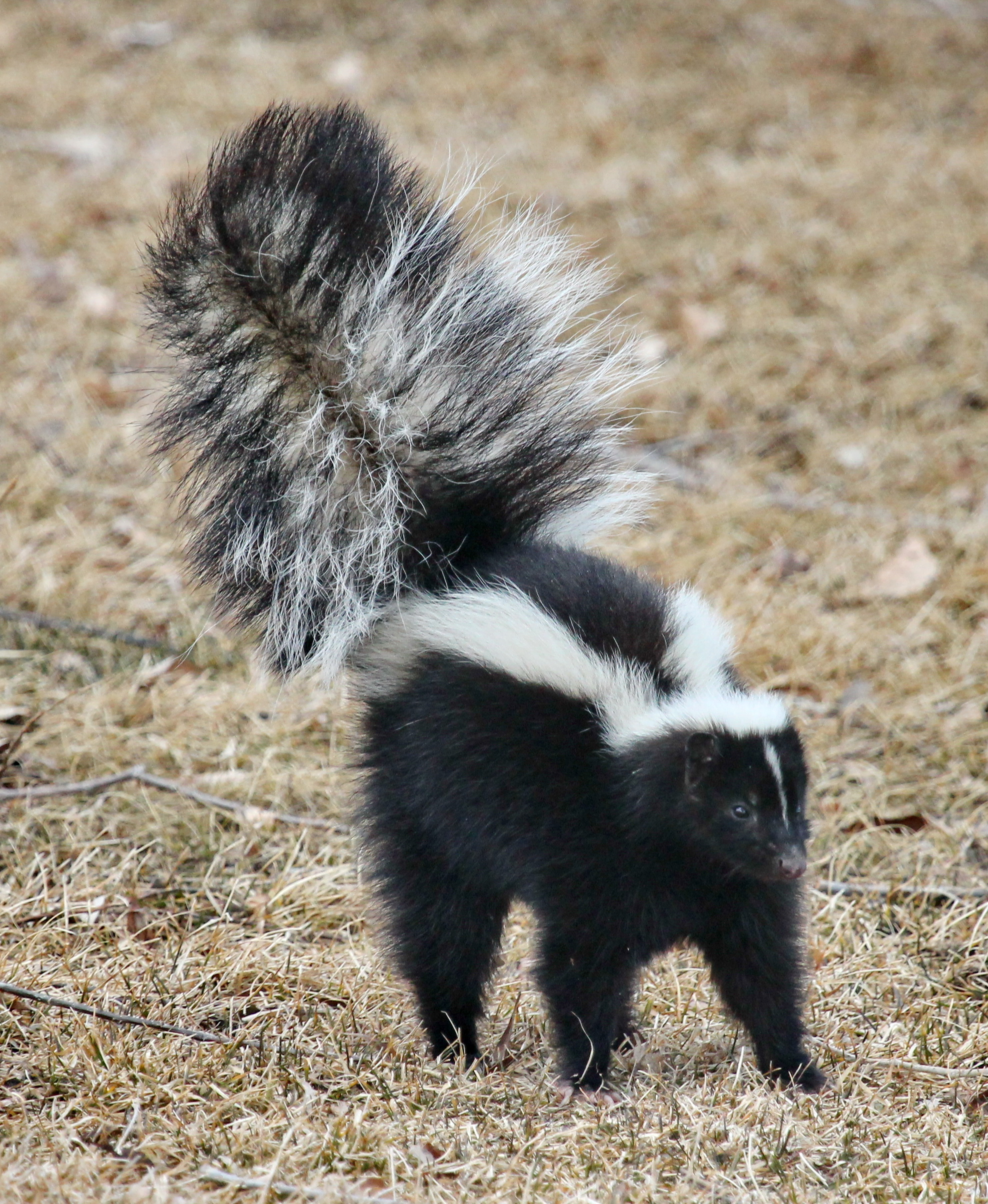
Skunk (Mephitis mephitis) in defensive posture with erect and puffed tail, indicating it may be about to spray.

Vertebrates can also biosynthesize defensive chemicals or sequester them from plants or prey. Sequestered compounds have been observed in frogs, natricine snakes, and two genera of birds, Pitohui and Ifrita. It is suspected that some well-known compounds such as tetrodotoxin produced by newts and pufferfish are derived from invertebrate prey. Bufadienolides, defensive chemicals produced by toads, have been found in glands of natricine snakes used for defense.

==== Amphibians ====
Frogs acquire the toxins needed for chemical defense by either producing them through glands on their skin or through their diet. The source of toxins in their diet are primarily arthropods, ranging from beetles to millipedes. When the required dietary components are absent, such as in captivity, the frog is no longer able to produce the toxins, making them nonpoisonous. The profile of toxins may even change with the season, as is the case for the Climbing Mantella, whose diet and feeding behavior differ between wet and dry seasons

The evolutionary advantage of producing such toxins is the deterrence of predators. There is evidence to suggest that the ability to produce toxins evolved along with aposematic coloration, acting as a visual cue to predators to remember which species are not palatable.

While the toxins produced by frogs are frequently referred to as poisonous, the doses of toxins are low enough that they are more noxious than poisonous. However, components of the toxins, namely the alkaloids, are very active in ion channels. Therefore, they disrupt the victim's nervous system, making them much more effective. Within the frogs themselves, the toxins are accumulated and delivered through small, specialized transport proteins.

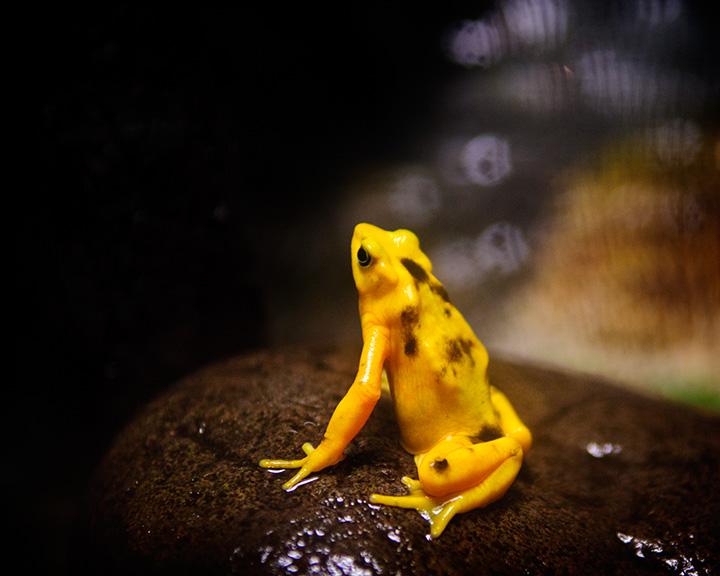
The Golden poison frog (Phyllobates terribilis) is among the species of poison frogs that have potential significance to medical research.

Besides providing defense from predators, the toxins that poison frogs secrete interest medical researchers. Poison dart frogs, of the Dendrobatidae family, secrete batrachotoxin. This toxin has the potential to act as a muscle relaxant, heart stimulant, or anesthetic. Multiple species of frogs secrete epibatidine, whose study has yielded several important results. It was discovered that the frogs resist poisoning themselves through a single amino acid replacement that desensitizes the targeted receptors to the toxin, but still maintains the function of the receptor. This finding gives insight to the roles of proteins, the nervous system, and the mechanics of chemical defense, all of which promote future biomedical research and innovation.

==== Mammals ====
Some mammals can emit foul smelling liquids from anal glands, such as the pangolin and some members of families Mephitidae and Mustelidae including skunks, weasels, and polecats. Monotremes have venomous spurs used to avoid predation and slow lorises (Primates: Nycticebus) produce venom which appears to be effective at deterring both predators and parasites. It has also been demonstrated that physical contact with a slow loris (without being bitten) can cause a reaction in humans – acting as a contact poison.

== See also ==
- Chemical ecology
