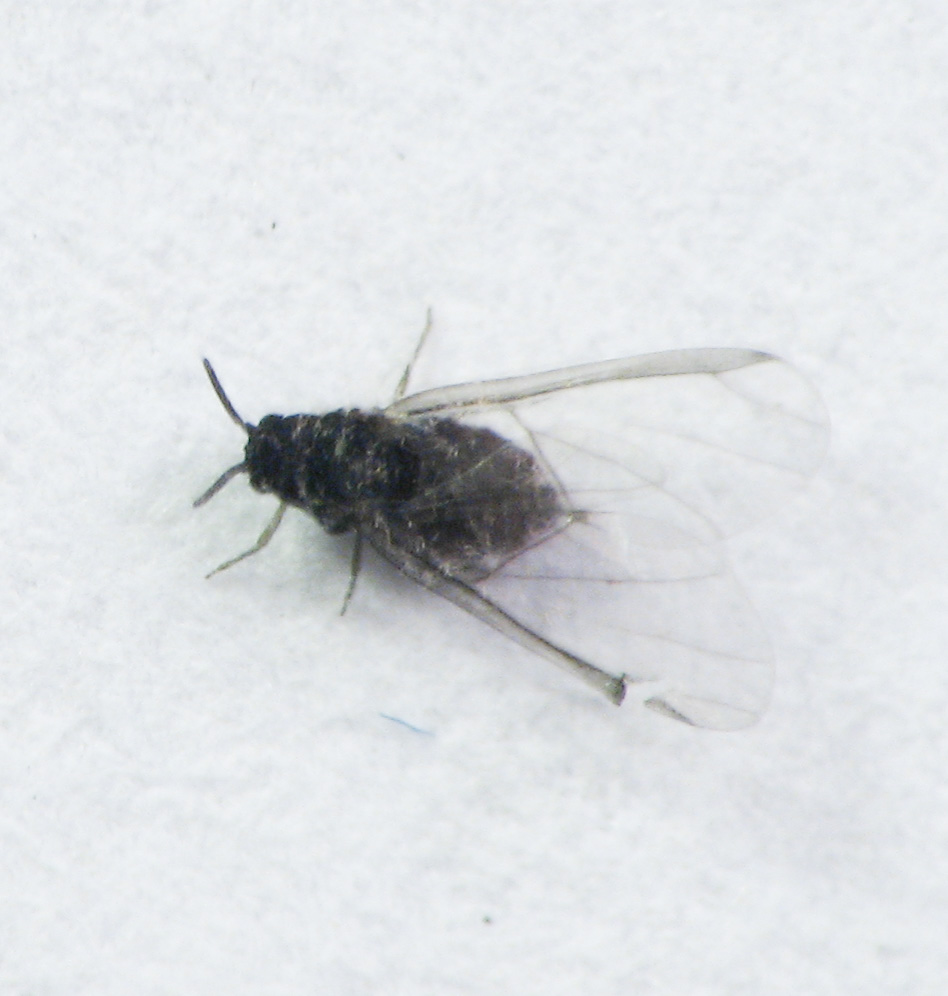
- Hormaphis hamamelidis winged adult

Scientific classification
- Domain: Eukaryota
- Kingdom: Animalia
- Phylum: Arthropoda
- Class: Insecta
- Order: Hemiptera
- Suborder: Sternorrhyncha
- Family: Aphididae
- Subfamily: Hormaphidinae

Tribes
- Cerataphidini; Hormaphidini; Nipponaphidini

= Hormaphidinae =

Subfamily of true bugs

Hormaphidinae is a subfamily of the family Aphididae.

== Genera ==
=== Tribe: Cerataphidini ===
Aleurodaphis - Astegopteryx - Cerataphis - Ceratoglyphina - Ceratovacuna - Chaitoregma - Glyphinaphis - Ktenopteryx - Pseudoregma - Tuberaphis

=== Tribe: Hormaphidini ===
Doraphis - Hamamelistes - Hormaphis - Protohormaphis - Tsugaphis

=== Tribe: Nipponaphidini ===
Allothoracaphis - Asiphonipponaphis - Dermaphis - Dinipponaphis - Distylaphis - Euthoracaphis - Indonipponaphis - Lithoaphis - Mesothoracaphis - Metanipponaphis - Metathoracaphis - Microunguis - Monzenia - Neodermaphis - Neohormaphis - Neonipponaphis - Neoreticulaphis - Neothoracaphis - Nipponaphis - Paranipponaphis - Parathoracaphis - Parathoracaphisella - Pseudothoracaphis - Quadrartus - Quernaphis - Reticulaphis - Schizoneuraphis - Sinonipponaphis - Thoracaphis

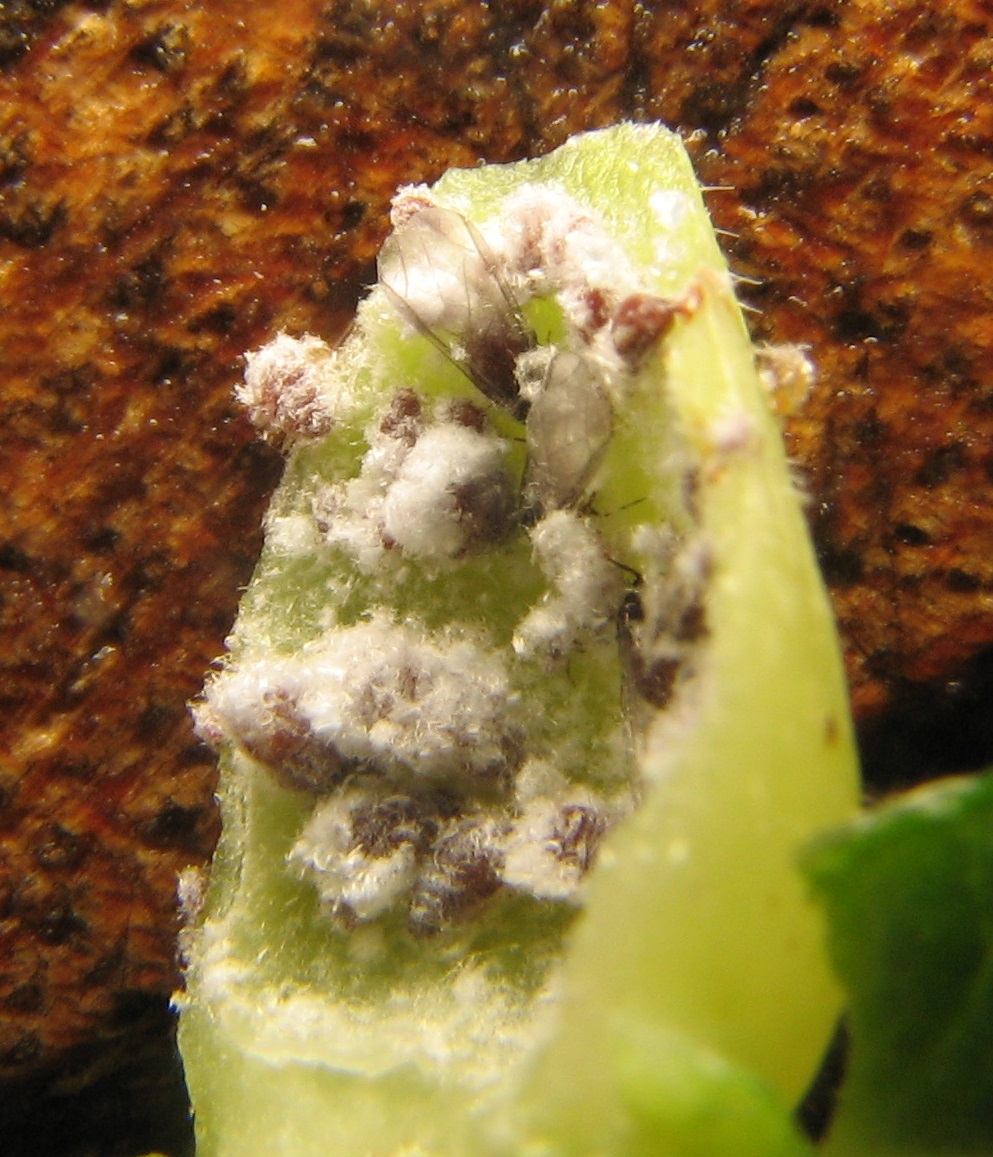
Hormaphis hamamelidis, gall's interior
