= Cerataphis orchidearum =

Scientific classification
- Kingdom: Animalia
- Phylum: Arthropoda
- Class: Insecta
- Order: Hemiptera
- Suborder: Sternorrhyncha
- Family: Aphididae
- Subfamily: Hormaphidinae
- Genus: Cerataphis
- Species: C. orchidearum

Binomial name
- Cerataphis orchidearum (Westwood, 1879)

Species of true bug

Cerataphis orchidearum, the fringed orchid aphid, is a species of aphid in the family Aphididae. It is found in Europe. Aphids of this species have been found on a Daemonorops lewisiana plant being tended to by yellow crazy ants.
