= Cerataphis =

Scientific classification
- Domain: Eukaryota
- Kingdom: Animalia
- Phylum: Arthropoda
- Class: Insecta
- Order: Hemiptera
- Suborder: Sternorrhyncha
- Family: Aphididae
- Subfamily: Hormaphidinae
- Genus: Cerataphis; Lichtenstein, 1882

Genus of true bugs

Cerataphis is a genus of witch hazel and palm aphids in the family Aphididae. There are about 10 described species in Cerataphis.

== Species ==
These 10 species belong to the genus Cerataphis:

- Cerataphis bambusifoliae Takahashi, 1925
- Cerataphis brasiliensis (Hempel, 1901)
- Cerataphis formosana Takahashi, 1924
- Cerataphis freycinetiae van der Goot, 1917
- Cerataphis jamuritsu
- Cerataphis lataniae (Boisduval, 1867)
- Cerataphis orchidearum (Westwood, 1879) (fringed orchid aphid)
- Cerataphis parsitica Qiao & Zhang, 2001
- Cerataphis pothophila Noordam, 1991
- Cerataphis vandermeermohri (Hille Ris Lambers, 1931)
