= Cerataphis brasiliensis =

Scientific classification
- Kingdom: Animalia
- Phylum: Arthropoda
- Clade: Pancrustacea
- Class: Insecta
- Order: Hemiptera
- Suborder: Sternorrhyncha
- Family: Aphididae
- Genus: Cerataphis
- Species: C. brasiliensis

Binomial name
- Cerataphis brasiliensis (Hempel, 1901)

Synonyms
- Ceratovacuna brasiliensis Hempel (1901); Astegopteryx fransseni Hille Ris Lambers (1933); Aleurocanthus palmae Ghesquiere (1934); Cerataphis palmae Ghesquiere (1947); Cerataphis fransseni Hille Ris Lambers (1953); Cerataphis variabilis Hille Ris Lambers (1953)

Species of true bug

Cerataphis brasiliensis, the palm aphid, is an aphid in the superfamily Aphidoidea in the order Hemiptera. It is a true bug and sucks sap from plants.

== Host plants ==
- Styrax benzoin
- Cocos nucifera
- Phoenix dactylifera
- Livistona chinensis
- Ptychosperma elegans
- Washingtonia robusta
