= Aflavinine =

Names
- IUPAC name (1S,4R,4aS,7R,7aS,11aS)-8-(1H-Indol-3-yl)-4,4a,7-trimethyl-9-propan-2-yl-1,2,3,4,5,6,7,7a,10,11-decahydrobenzo[i]naphthalen-1-ol

Identifiers
CAS Number	74328-59-9
3D model (JSmol)	Interactive image
ChemSpider	10313765
PubChem CID	21725958
UNII	42N1443TXV
CompTox Dashboard (EPA)	DTXSID40995845
- InChI: InChI=1S/C28H39NO/c1-17(2)20-13-15-28-24(30)11-10-19(4)27(28,5)14-12-18(3)26(28)25(20)22-16-29-23-9-7-6-8-21(22)23/h6-9,16-19,24,26,29-30H,10-15H2,1-5H3/t18-,19-,24+,26+,27+,28+/m1/s1 Key: LXZADDNPPHIYMD-QQVIWQHHSA-N
- SMILES: CC1CCC2(C(CCC(C23C1C(=C(CC3)C(C)C)C4=CNC5=CC=CC=C54)O)C)C

Properties
Chemical formula	C_{28}H_{39}NO
Molar mass	405.626 g·mol^{−1}
- Except where otherwise noted, data are given for materials in their standard state (at 25 °C [77 °F], 100 kPa). Infobox references

Aflavinine is an anti-insectan chemical compound produced by some plants and fungi.
