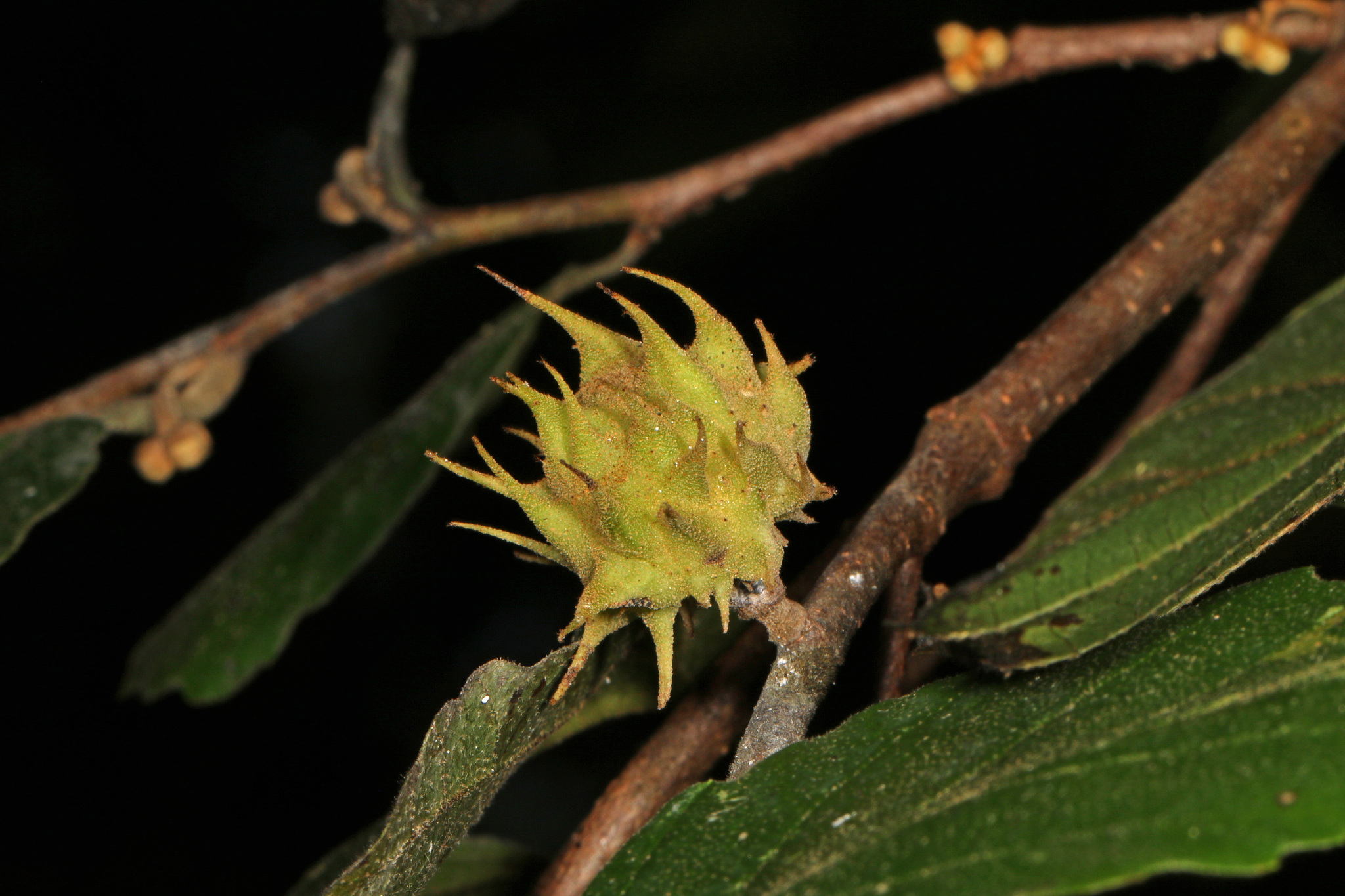
- Hamamelistes spinosus gall on a Witch Hazel
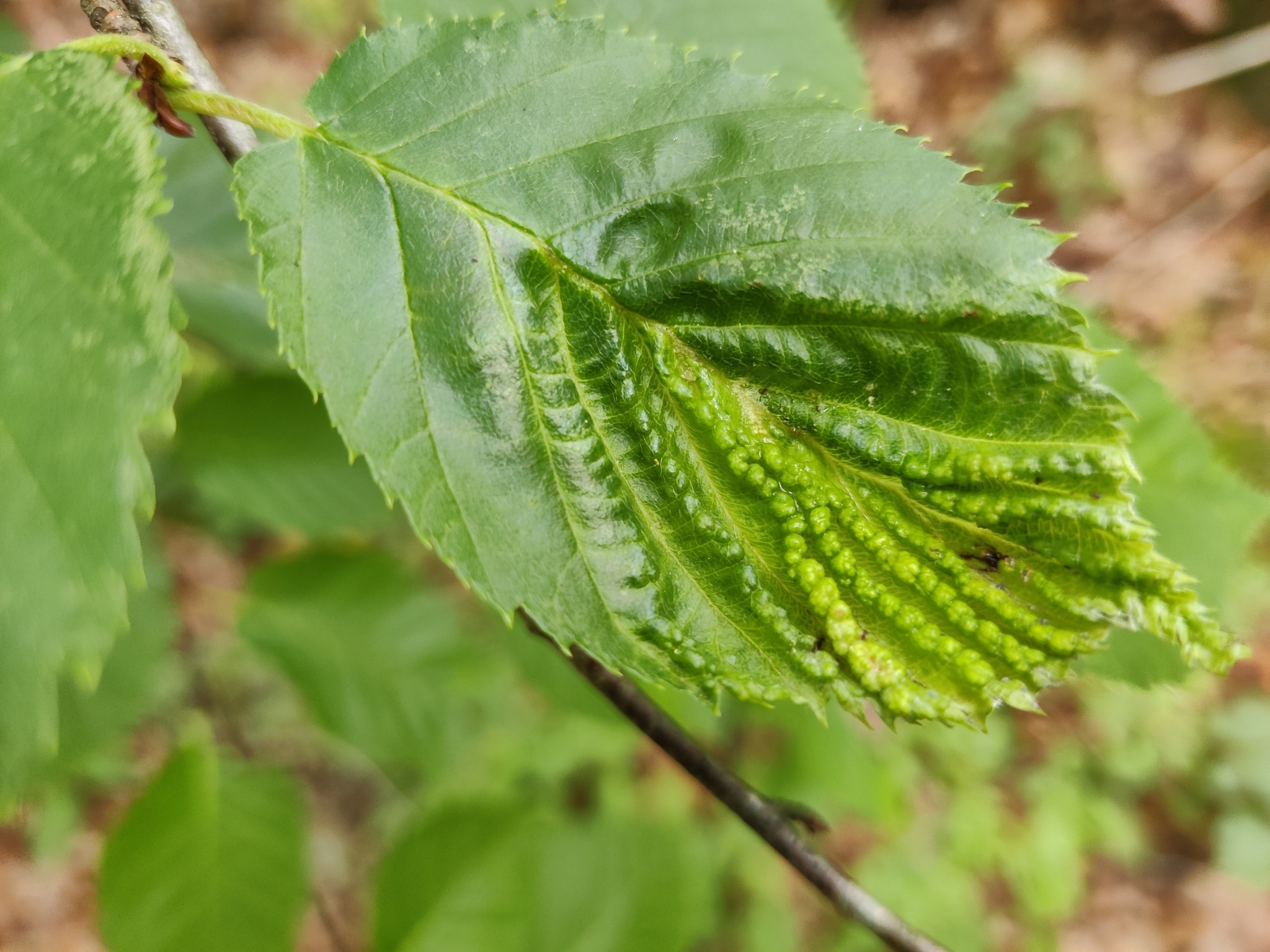
- Hamamelistes spinosus gall on a birch

Scientific classification
- Kingdom: Animalia
- Phylum: Arthropoda
- Class: Insecta
- Order: Hemiptera
- Suborder: Sternorrhyncha
- Family: Aphididae
- Genus: Hamamelistes
- Species: H. spinosus

Binomial name
- Hamamelistes spinosus Shimer, 1867

= Hamamelistes spinosus =

Species of aphid

Hamamelistes spinosus, also known as the spiny witch-hazel gall aphid, is a species of aphid that creates galls on witch hazel and birch species. Its eggs are laid on Witch Hazel in galls, where they overwinter and hatch in spring. They manipulate and live in leaves on birch, with nymphs eating leaves then overwintering on stems. Their life cycles tend to last around 2 years. They create galls by feeding on leaf buds in a way that forms them to support their young.

Hamamelistes spinosus is found across North America, from Mexico to Canada.

== On birch ==
It is recorded on 8 species of birch (Betula albosinensis, B. alleghaniensis, B. lenta, B. nigra, B. papyrifera, B. pendula, B. populifolia, B. pumila). Birch leaves affected by H. spinosus often turn yellow or red, and the aphids develop on the underside of the leaves.

== Description ==
Hamamelistes spinosus galls are modified flower buds, somewhat elliptical in outline with gradually tapering stalks. They are covered with spines, which are usually curved. The opening is situated at the union of the stalk and the gall proper. This opening is funnel-shaped and is surrounded by a circular ring of tissue.

Dimensions: — Average length including stalk 21 mm.; average width 10 mm.
