= Ceratovacuna =

Scientific classification
- Kingdom: Animalia
- Phylum: Arthropoda
- Class: Insecta
- Order: Hemiptera
- Suborder: Sternorrhyncha
- Family: Aphididae
- Subfamily: Hormaphidinae
- Tribe: Cerataphidini
- Genus: Ceratovacuna; Zehntner, 1897

Genus of insects

Ceratovacuna is a genus of aphids in the order Hemiptera. Some species are pests of millet. It was first described by Leo Zehntner.

== Species ==
Species accepted as of April 2025:

- Ceratovacuna angusticorna Qiao, 2015
- Ceratovacuna atrovirensa Qiao, 2021
- Ceratovacuna beijingensis Qiao, 2015
- Ceratovacuna cerbera Aoki, Kurosu, Shin & Choe, 1999
- Ceratovacuna cynodonti Chakrabarti & Debnath, 2011
- Ceratovacuna doipuiensis Sirikajornjaru, Rojanavongse & Upatham, 2002
- Ceratovacuna floccifera Noordam, 1991
- Ceratovacuna graminum (van der Goot, 1917)
- Ceratovacuna hoffmanni
- Ceratovacuna imperata Qiao, 2015
- Ceratovacuna japonica (Takahashi, 1924)
- Ceratovacuna keduensis Noordam, 1991
- Ceratovacuna lanigera Zehntner, 1897
- Ceratovacuna longifila (Takahashi, 1929)
- Ceratovacuna multiglandula Qiao, 2015
- Ceratovacuna nekoashi (Sasaki, 1907)
- Ceratovacuna oplismeni (Takahashi, 1924)
- Ceratovacuna orientalis (Takahashi, 1923)
- Ceratovacuna panici (van der Goot, 1917)
- Ceratovacuna perglandulosa Basu, Ghosh & Raychaudhuri, 1973
- Ceratovacuna separata Qiao, 2015
- Ceratovacuna silvestrii (Takahashi)
- Ceratovacuna spinulosa Ghosh & Raychaudhuri, 1972
- Ceratovacuna subtropicana Aoki & Kurosu, 2013
- Ceratovacuna uscare (Tao, 1964)
