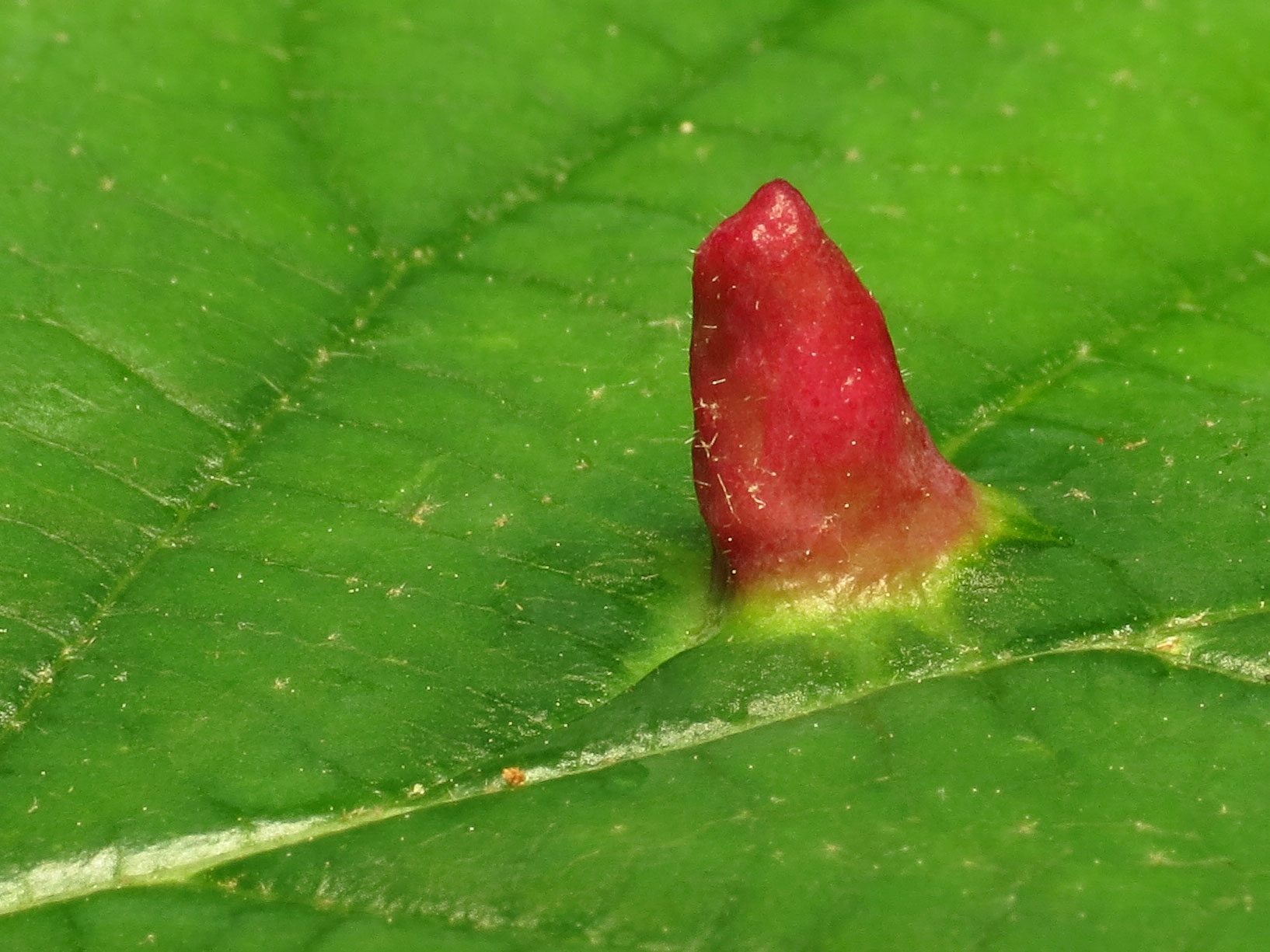
- Hormaphis hamamelidis, Witch Hazel Cone Gall Aphid

Scientific classification
- Kingdom: Animalia
- Phylum: Arthropoda
- Class: Insecta
- Order: Hemiptera
- Suborder: Sternorrhyncha
- Family: Aphididae
- Subfamily: Hormaphidinae
- Tribe: Hormaphidini
- Genus: Hormaphis; Osten-Sacken, 1861

= Hormaphis =

Genus of true bugs

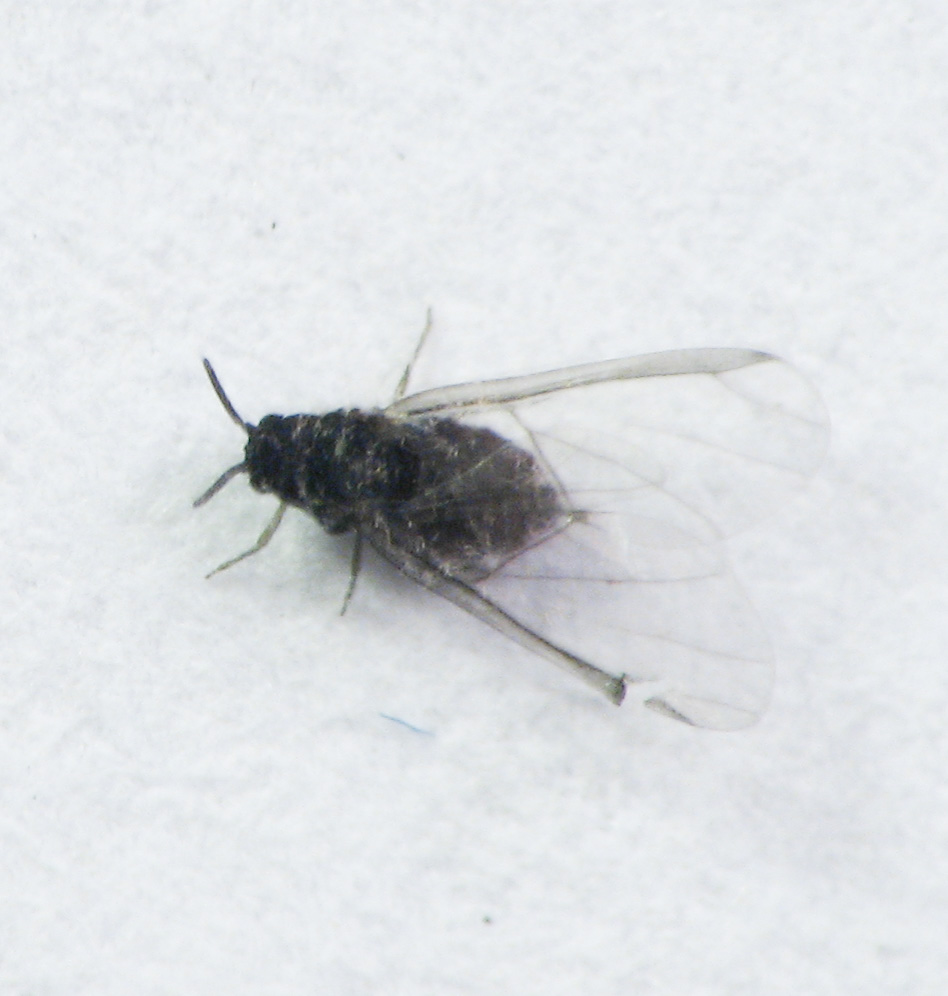
Hormaphis hamamelidis winged adult.jpg

Hormaphis is a genus of witch hazel and palm aphids in the family Aphididae. There are at least three described species in Hormaphis, found mainly in eastern North America.

== Species ==
These three species belong to the genus Hormaphis:

- Hormaphis betulae (Mordvilko, 1901)
- Hormaphis cornu (Shimer, 1867)
- Hormaphis hamamelidis (Fitch, 1851) (witch hazel cone gall aphid)
