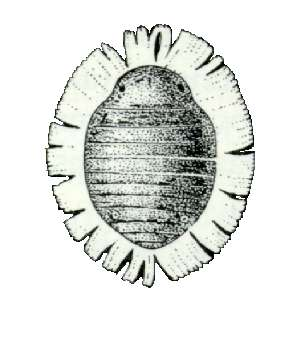
- Cerataphis lataniae.jpg

Scientific classification
- Kingdom: Animalia
- Phylum: Arthropoda
- Clade: Pancrustacea
- Class: Insecta
- Order: Hemiptera
- Suborder: Sternorrhyncha
- Family: Aphididae
- Genus: Cerataphis
- Species: C. lataniae

Binomial name
- Cerataphis lataniae (Boisduval, 1867)

= Cerataphis lataniae =

Aphid species

Cerataphis lataniae, commonly known as the palm aphid, is an aphid known to infest palm species as well as a variety of leafy plants. It is one the most common pests that causes damage to agriculture and human health. It is able to cause death to plants prematurely or cause their flowers/leaves to fall early.

Trade of palm and coconut tree varieties for ornamental and agricultural regions has allowed for expansion of this aphid's range. Mitigation strategies are being experimented in case the mild damage observed to be caused by the aphid to coconut trees begins to cause economic damage.

== Description ==
Cerataphis lataniae is wingless, small, oval flattened, shiny-brown or orange-brown with a flat white fringe of wax. Nymphs are similar to adult C. lataniae with their color and their body shapes, but the nymphs are smaller in size. The adult C. lataniae are approximately 0.8-1.3 mm long, 0.7-1.1 mm wide and have 4-5 segments on their antennae. The cauda has 8-12 setae and the posterior margin of the genital plate has 7-14 setae. The wax that surrounds the body is produced by the wax gland plates arranged in a series of oval facets like a chain on the edge of the body.

== Reproduction and life cycle ==
Live young develop through parthenogenesis and are born to anholocyclic females, therefore no eggs have been identified, nor described. The growth stages consist of the flowering stage, the fruiting stage, the post-harvest stage, and the vegatative stage.

== Host species ==
Cerataphis lataniae commonly colonizes Styrax spp., and secondary hosts in the Arecaceae (palms), Pandanaceae, Orchidaceae (orchids), and Araceae families. Potential negative interactions between this pest and varieties of coconut palms are most interesting as this has the greatest potential for economic damage. Cerataphis lataniae have been found to feed on all external surfaces of the plant (stems and leaves). They prefer to reside in the ocrea of the palm and subsequent removal of ocrea is followed by instant relocation by nymphs and for adult aphids relocation via myrmecophytic ants has occurred in less than an hour.

== Native distribution ==
The aphid originates in the two tropic regions of the Northern Mariana Islands and Federated States of Micronesia Asian Countries as well as throughout Asian countries (city): China (Hainan and Hong Kong), India (Maharashtra), Indonesia (Java), Malaysia, Philippines, Taiwan.

== Global invasion ==
Cerataphis lataniae can be found outside of tropical regions, common on palms in greenhouses, and especially in Germany. The first documented observations of C. lataniae, known at the time by Coccus lataniae, outside of its natural range, was in Paris on Latania palms in 1867. This pest is found to the large extent only in greenhouses and relocation of infested plants to ambient weather generally leads to the pests death. Because the climate necessary for its host species of coconut and palm varieties is only possible below certain latitudes, much of this aphid invasion is facilitated by human trade and movement for not only agricultural reasons but for aesthetic reasons as well. The palms in European greenhouses associated with the first documented findings of the aphid in Europe were of exotic origin.

== Economic effect/damage ==
No direct evidence of damage by the aphid has been identified. Development of sooty molds as a secondary infection could be facilitated by their honeydew production. Increased susceptibility to coconut moth damage has been documented in Lataniae-infested coconut trees. This species also can act as a vector for plant pathogens as many other aphid species. Because the aphid has been shown to infest banana plants, the possibility of damage to this host is being monitored as this would cause considerable economic damage. Some signs that are associated with infected plants are abnormal shapes to the fruit and premature drop, external feeding in inflorescence, abnormal leaf fall, and external feeding from the whole plant.

== Mitigation ==
The most common control and mitigation strategy is manual removal. This strategy includes trimming infested portions of the plant and destroying them or treating infected plants with aphicide or burning the plants. Biocontrol by entomopathogenic fungus or insect predators may also be employed, especially in regions where pesticide use is restricted.
