= Lichen anatomy and physiology =

Structure of lichens

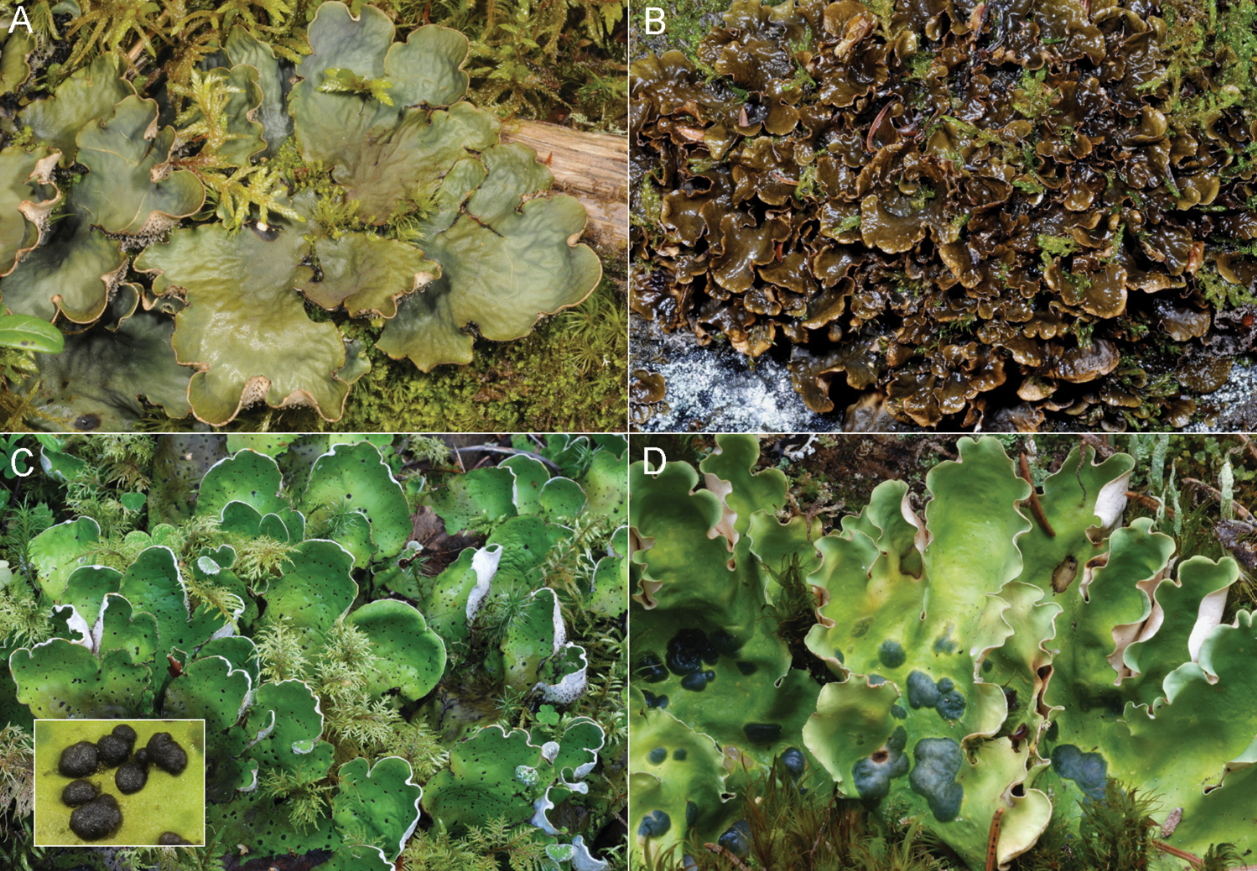
Lichen

Lichen anatomy and physiology is very different from the anatomy and physiology of the fungus and/or algae and/or cyanobacteria that make up the lichen when growing apart from the lichen, either naturally, or in culture. The fungal partner is called the mycobiont. The photosynthetic partner, algae or cyanobacteria, is called the photobiont. The body of a lichens that does not contain reproductive parts of the fungus is called the thallus. The thallus is different from those of either the fungus or alga growing separately. The fungus surrounds the algal cells, often enclosing them within complex fungal tissues unique to lichen associations. In many species the fungus penetrates the algal cell wall, forming penetration pegs or haustoria similar to those produced by pathogenic fungi. Lichens are capable of surviving extremely low levels of water content (poikilohydric). However, the re-configuration of membranes following a period of dehydration requires several minutes at least.

The algal or cyanobacterial cells are photosynthetic, and as in plants they reduce atmospheric carbon dioxide into organic carbon sugars to feed both symbionts. Both partners gain water and mineral nutrients mainly from the atmosphere, through rain and dust. The fungal partner protects the alga by retaining water, serving as a larger capture area for mineral nutrients and, in some cases, provides minerals obtained from the substrate. If a cyanobacterium is present, as a primary partner or another symbiont in addition to green alga as in certain tripartite lichens, they can fix atmospheric nitrogen, complementing the activities of the green alga.

Although strains of cyanobacteria found in various cyanolichens are often closely related to one another, they differ from the most closely related free-living strains. The lichen association is a close symbiosis. It extends the ecological range of both partners but is not always obligatory for their growth and reproduction in natural environments, since many of the algal symbionts can live independently. A prominent example is the alga Trentepohlia which forms orange-coloured populations on tree trunks and suitable rock faces. Lichen propagules (diaspores) typically contain cells from both partners, although the fungal components of so-called "fringe species" rely instead on algal cells dispersed by the "core species".

Lichen associations may be examples of mutualism, commensalism or even parasitism, depending on the species. Cyanobacteria in laboratory settings can grow faster when they are alone rather than when they are part of a lichen.

In tests, lichen survived and showed remarkable results on the adaptation capacity of photosynthetic activity within the simulation time of 34 days under Martian conditions in the Mars Simulation Laboratory (MSL) maintained by the German Aerospace Center (DLR).

== Symbionts ==
Schematic cross section of lichen, a symbiosis between green algae and a fungus. 1. Thick layers of hyphae, called the cortex 2. Green algae 3. Loosely packed hyphae 4. Anchoring hyphae called rhizines.

"Lichens are fungi that have discovered agriculture" - Trevor Goward

Living as a symbiont in a lichen appears to be a successful way for a fungus to derive essential nutrients, as about 20% of all fungal species have acquired this mode of life. The fungal partner may be an Ascomycete or Basidiomycete. Common algal partners are Trebouxia, Pseudotrebouxia, or Myrmecia. Common cyanobacterium partners include are Nostoc or Scytonema.

The largest number of lichenized fungi occur in the Ascomycota, with about 40% of species forming such an association. Some of these lichenized fungi occur in orders with nonlichenized fungi that live as saprotrophs or plant parasites (for example, the Leotiales, Dothideales, and Pezizales). Other lichen fungi occur in only five orders in which all members are engaged in this habit (Orders Graphidales, Gyalectales, Peltigerales, Pertusariales, and Teloschistales). Lichenized and nonlichenized fungi can even be found in the same genus or species. Overall, about 98% of lichens have an ascomycetous mycobiont. Next to the Ascomycota, the largest number of lichenized fungi occur in the unassigned fungi imperfecti. Comparatively few basidiomycetes are lichenized, but these include agarics, such as species of Lichenomphalia, clavarioid fungi, such as species of Multiclavula, and corticioid fungi, such as species of Dictyonema.

The autotrophic symbionts occurring in lichens are a wide variety of simple, photosynthetic organisms commonly and traditionally known as algae. These symbionts include both prokaryotic and eukaryotic organisms. Approximately 100 species of photosynthetic partners from 40 genera and five distinct classes (prokaryotic: Cyanophyceae; eukaryotic: Trebouxiophyceae, Phaeophyceae, Chlorophyceae) have been found to associate with the lichen-forming fungi. The prokaryotes belong to the Cyanobacteria, whose representatives are often called bluegreen algae. The bluegreen algae occur as symbionts in about 8% of the known lichens. The most commonly occurring genus is Nostoc. The majority of the lichens contain eukaryotic autotrophs belonging to the Chlorophyta (green algae) or to the Xanthophyta (yellow-green algae). About 90% of all known lichens have a green alga as a symbiont, and among these, Trebouxia is the most common genus, occurring in about 40% of all lichens. The second most commonly represented green alga genus is Trentepohlia. Overall, about 100 species are known to occur as autotrophs in lichens. All the algae are probably able to exist independently in nature as well as in the lichen.

A particular fungus species and algal species are not necessarily always associated together in a lichen. One fungus, for example, can form lichens with a variety of different algae. The thalli produced by a given fungal symbiont with its differing partners will be similar, and the secondary metabolites identical, indicating that the fungus has the dominant role in determining the morphology of the lichen. Further, the same algal species can occur in association with different fungal partners. Lichens are known in which there is one fungus associated with two or even three algal species. Rarely, the reverse can occur, and two or more fungal species can interact to form the same lichen.

Both the lichen and the fungus partner bear the same scientific name, and the lichens are being integrated into the classification schemes for fungi. The alga bears its own scientific name, which bears no relationship to that of the lichen or fungi.

=== Fungus component ===
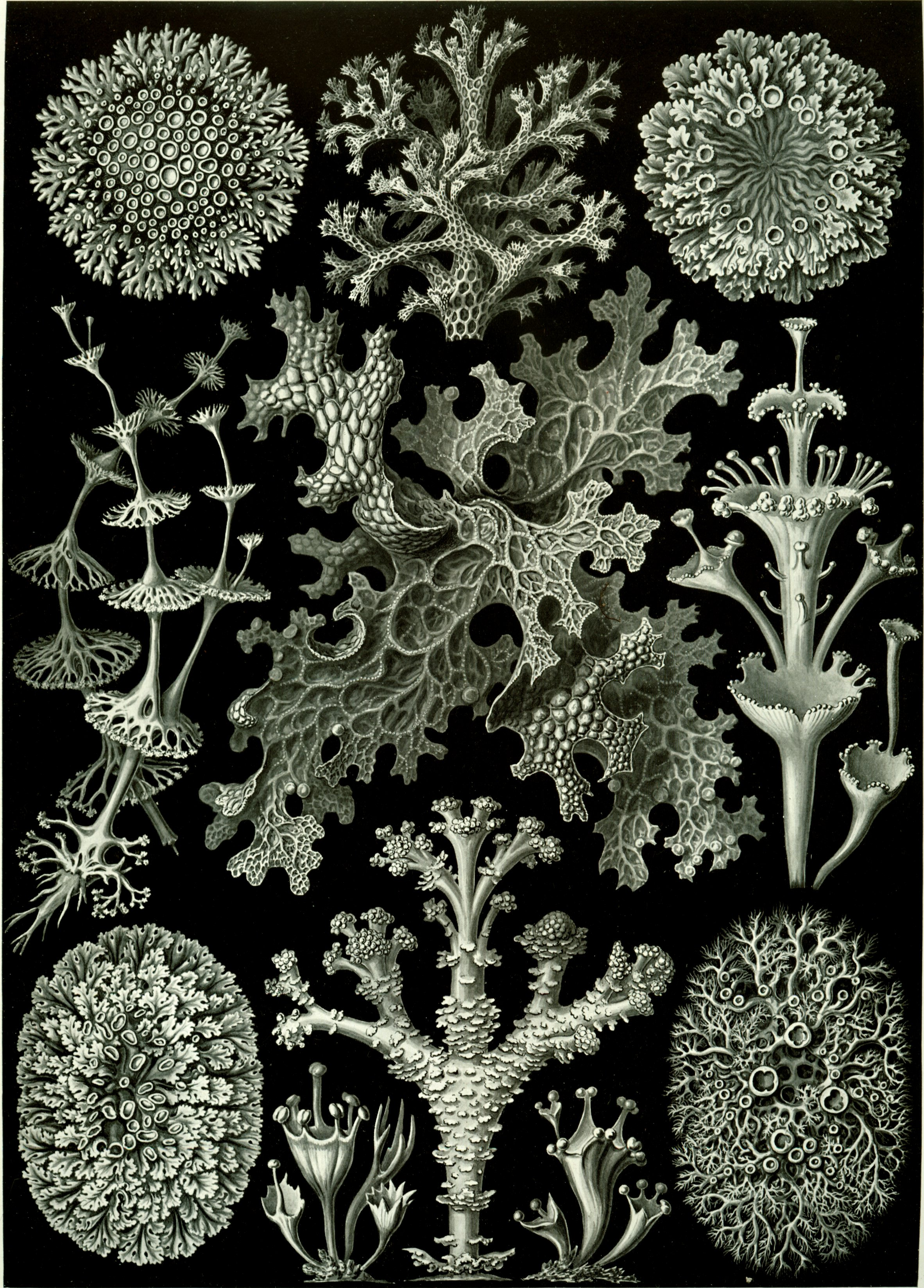
Lichenised fungi

Depending on context, the entire lichen, or just the fungus that is part of the lichen. Both the lichen and the fungus that is a part of the lichen are currently (2014) given the same species name, which creates an ambiguity. An example of when "lichenized fungus" refers to just the fungus is when the fungus is grown in culture without a phycobiont. An example where "lichenized fungus" refers to the entire lichen is in a list of classified lichens.

Some fungi can only be found living on lichens (obligate parasites), but are not considered part of the lichen. These are referred to as lichenolous fungi.

=== Photosynthetic component ===
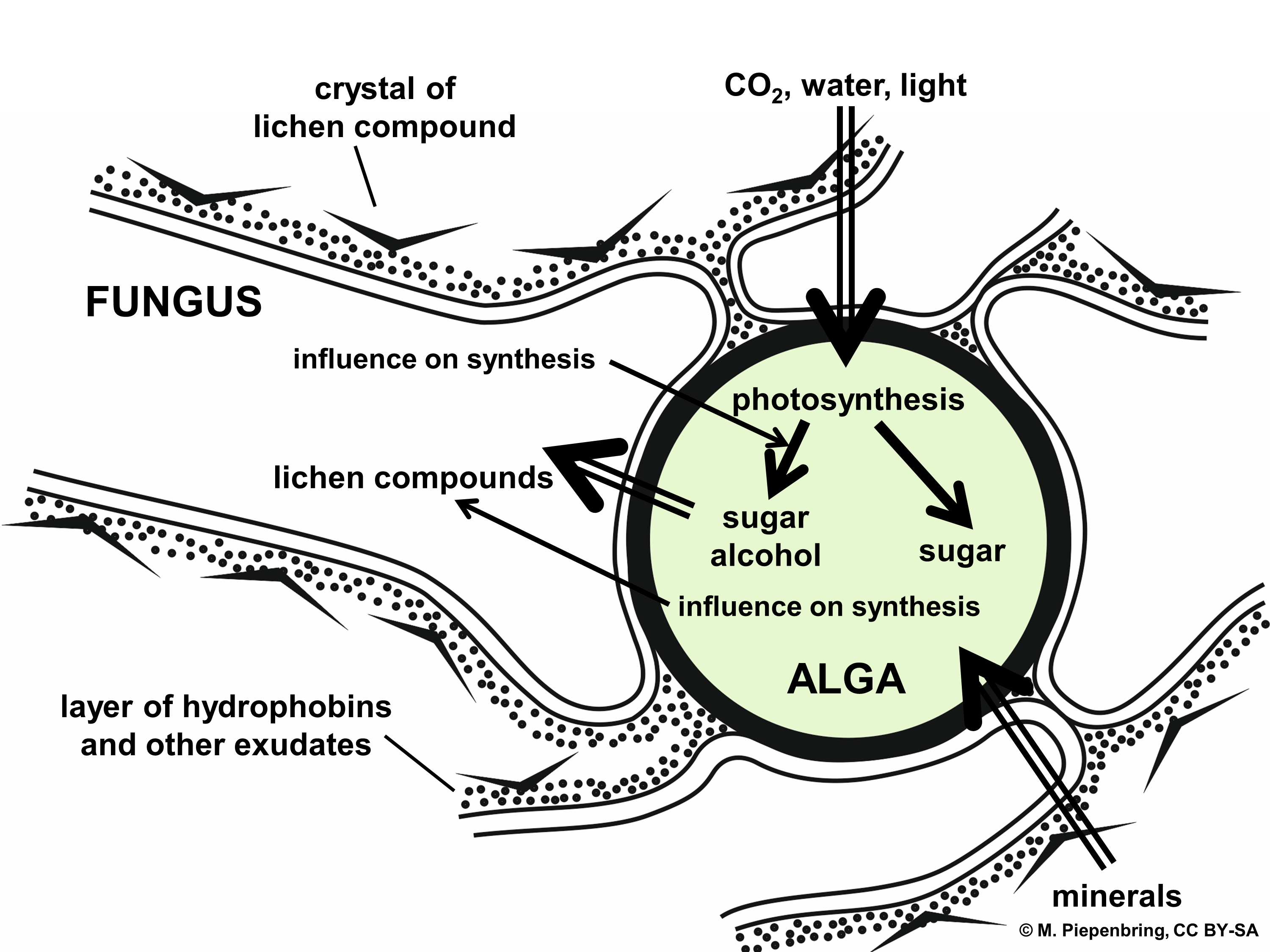
Lichens interaction

The photosynthetic component of a lichen is called the photobiont or phycobiont. Sometimes the photobiont is a green alga (Chlorophyta), sometimes a 'blue-green alga' (cyanobacterium, a photosynthetic bacterium rather than an alga in the strict sense), and sometimes both. The layer of tissue containing the cells of the photobiont is called the "photobiontic layer".

"Clorococcoid" means a green alga (Chlorophyta) that has single cells that are globose, which is common in lichens. These were once classified in the order Chlorococcales, which you may find stated in older literature, but new DNA data shows many independent lines of evolution exist among this formerly large taxonomic group. Chlorococcales is now a relatively small order and may no longer include any lichen photobionts. Trebouxia, once included here, is now considered to be in a separate class, Trebouxiophyceae. "Trebouxioid" refers to members of this class or algae resembling them.

"Trebouxioid" means a clorococcoid green algal photobiont belongs to the genus Trebouxia, or resembles a member of that genus, and is therefore presumably a member of the class Trebouxiophyceae.

=== Cyanolichens ===
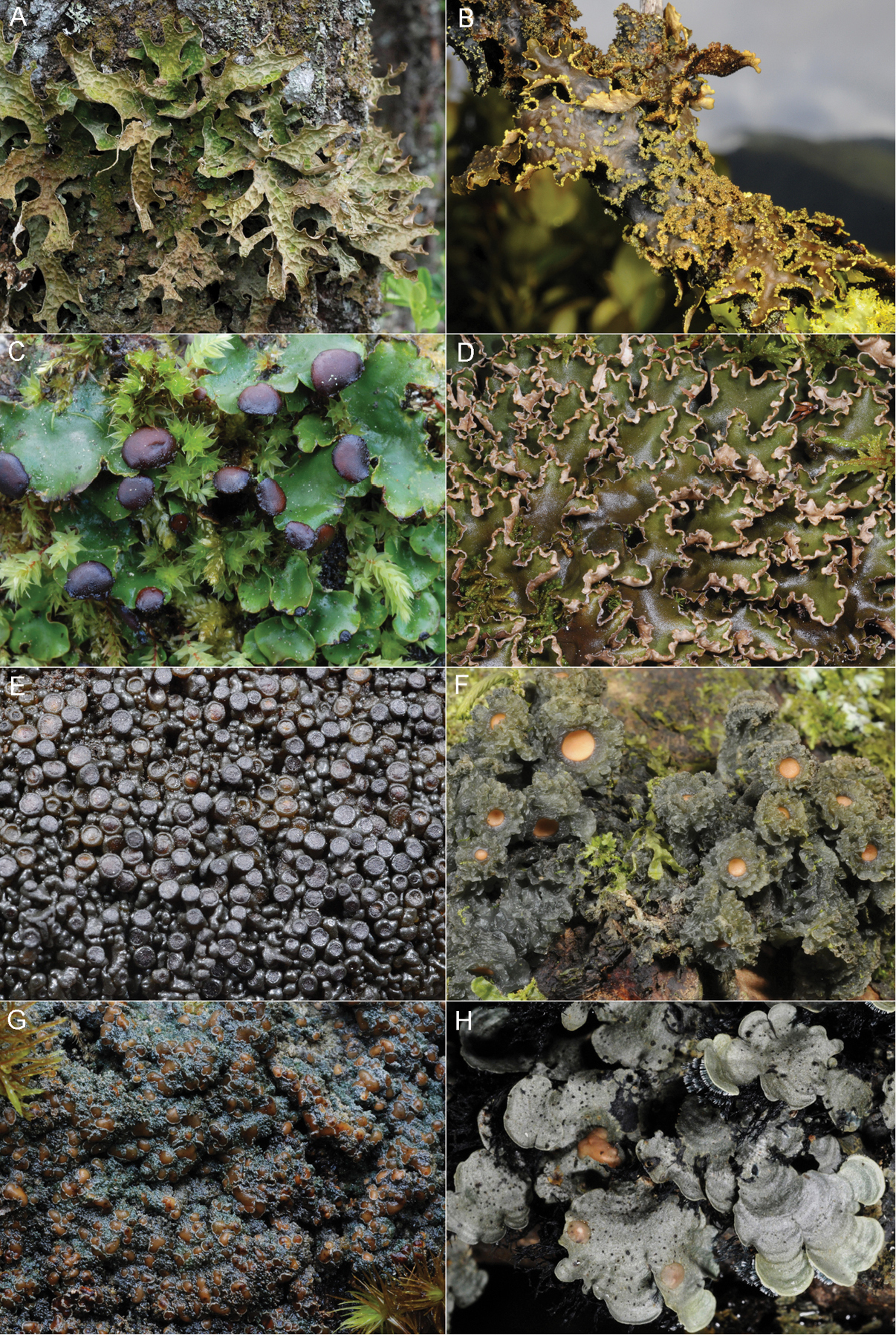
Cyanolichens

A cyanolichen is a lichen with a cyanobacteria as its main photosynthetic component (photobiont). Many cyanolichens are small and black, and have limestone as the substrate. Another cyanolichen group, the jelly lichens ( e.g., from the genera Collema or Leptogium) are large and foliose (e.g., species of Peltigera, Lobaria, and Degelia). These lichen species are grey-blue, especially when dampened or wet. Many of these characterize the Lobarion communities of higher rainfall areas in western Britain, e.g., in the Celtic Rainforest.
