= Ceratovacuna lanigera =

Scientific classification
- Domain: Eukaryota
- Kingdom: Animalia
- Phylum: Arthropoda
- Class: Insecta
- Order: Hemiptera
- Suborder: Sternorrhyncha
- Family: Aphididae
- Genus: Ceratovacuna
- Species: C. lanigera

Binomial name
- Ceratovacuna lanigera Zehntner, 1897

Species of true bug

Ceratovacuna lanigera, the sugarcane woolly aphid, is an aphid in the order Hemiptera. Found in India and Southeast Asia, this true bug sucks sap from plants. It is a foliage sucking aphid species.
