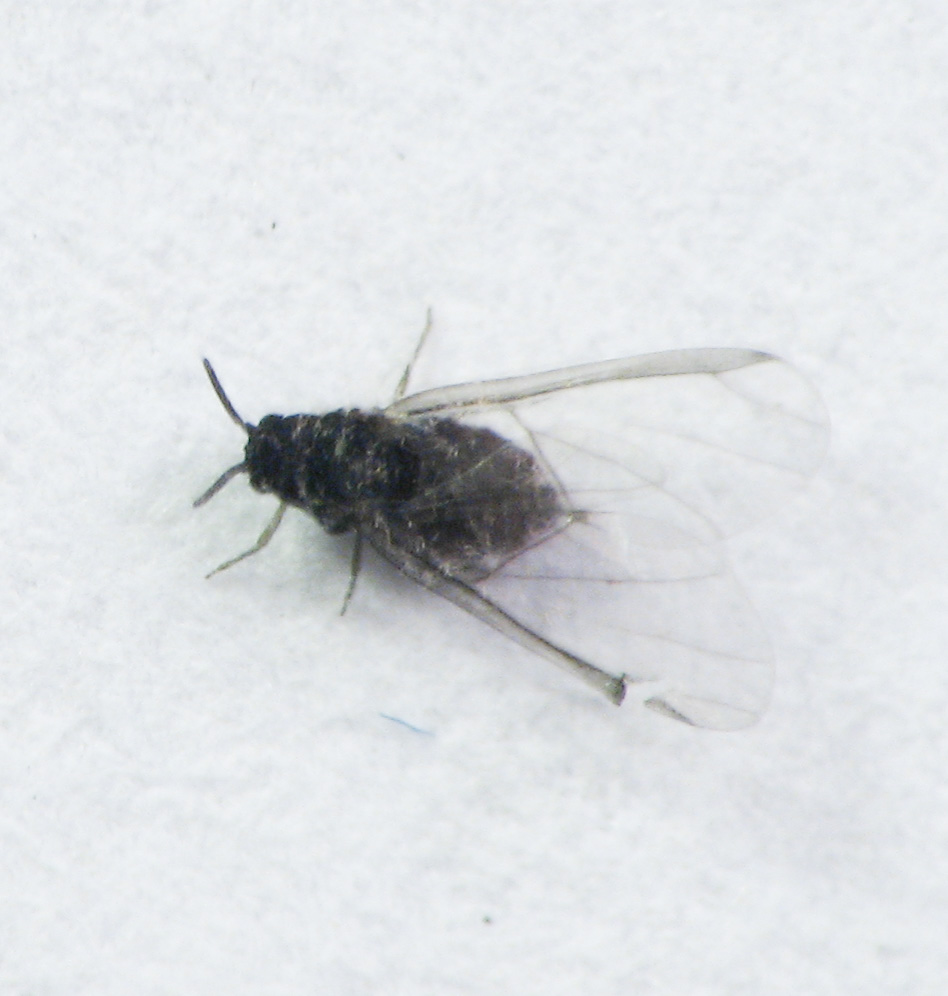
- Winged adult

Scientific classification
- Kingdom: Animalia
- Phylum: Arthropoda
- Class: Insecta
- Order: Hemiptera
- Suborder: Sternorrhyncha
- Family: Aphididae
- Genus: Hormaphis
- Species: H. hamamelidis

Binomial name
- Hormaphis hamamelidis Fitch, 1851

= Witch-hazel cone gall aphid =

Species of true bug

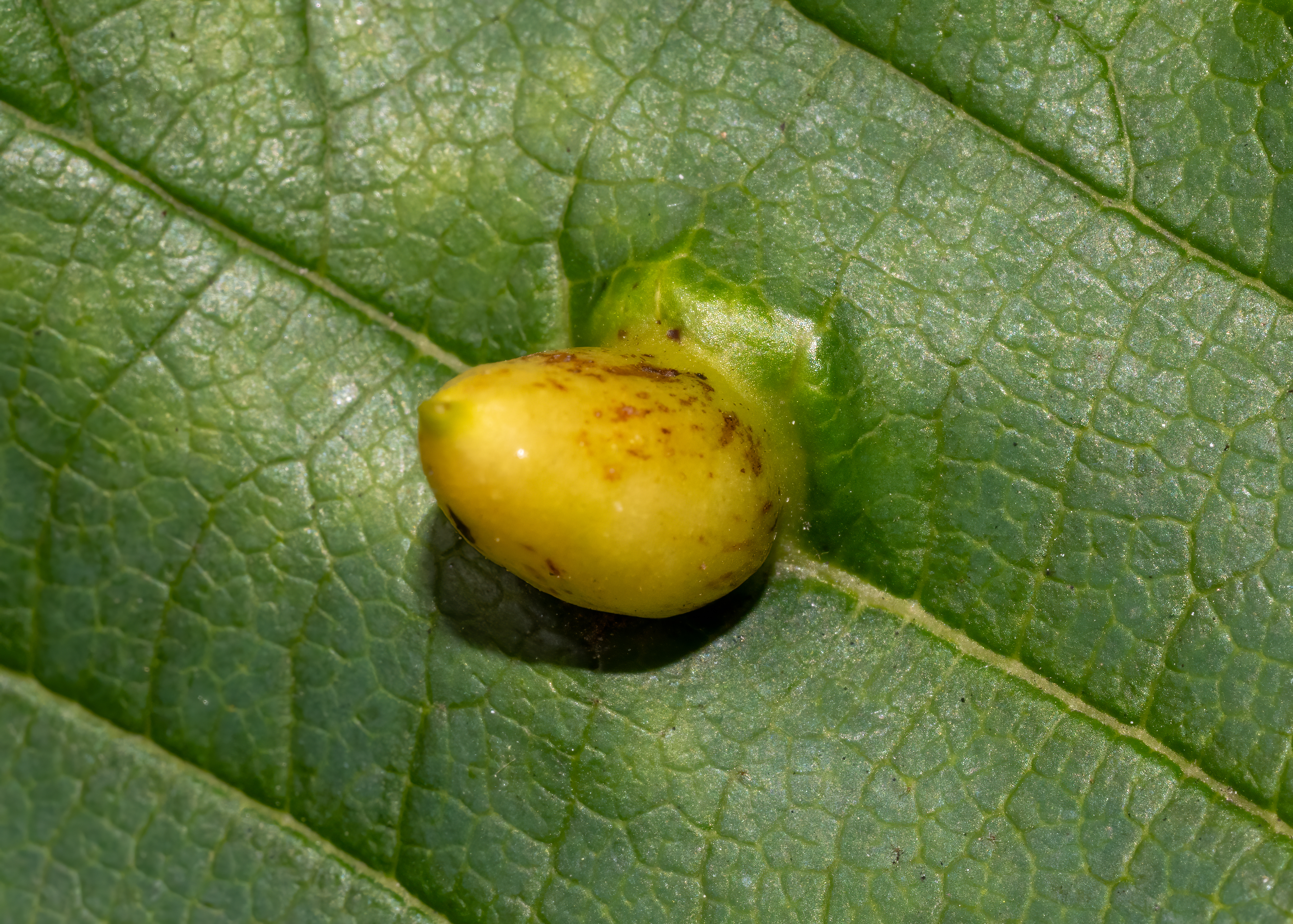
Gall

The witch-hazel cone gall aphid (Hormaphis hamamelidis) is a minuscule insect, a member of the aphid superfamily, whose presence on a witch-hazel (Hamamelis virginiana) plant is easily recognizable by a conical gall structure. The gall is green at first, then turns bright red. This gall, rich in nutrients, provides both food and shelter for the female aphid.

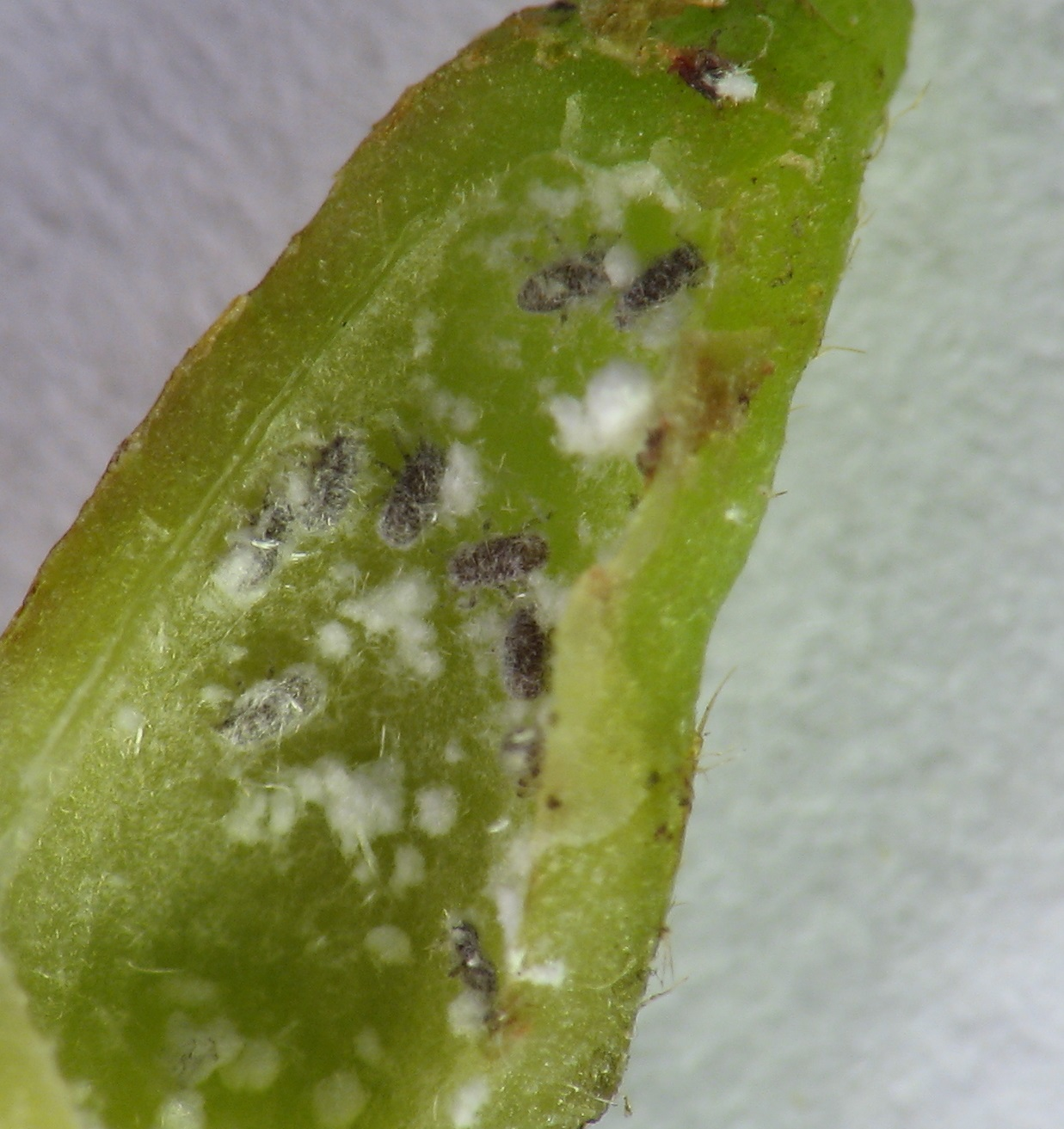
Gall's interior

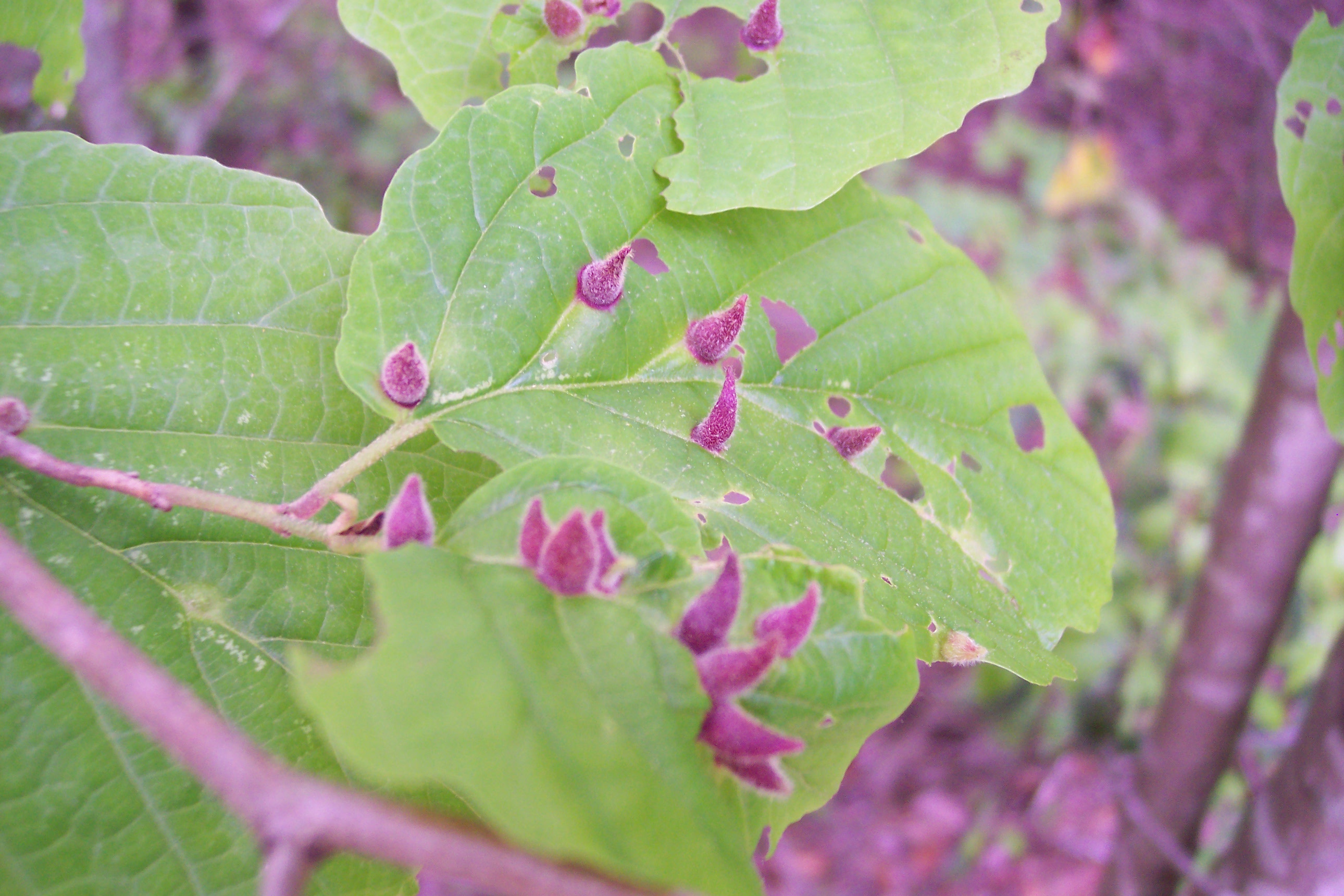
Witch Hazel Cone Galls

H. hamamelidis have three generations per year, each with a different part in the life cycle. At the start of spring, females or stem mothers crawl to witch-hazel leaf buds. As the leaf grows, the aphid injects it with a substance, possibly an enzyme or hormone, that causes that the galls to form around her. Once inside her gall, the stem mother reproduces parthenogenically and fills the gall with 50–70 female offspring. The second generation develops wings and disperses, repeating the process. The third generation includes both males and females. Towards the end of summer, the third generation reproduces sexually and lays eggs on the bark of the witch-hazel. The cycle begins anew in the following spring.

Hormaphis hamamelidis is sometimes mistaken with Hormaphis cornu. The two are closely related, both live in the eastern US, and both form galls on witch-hazel. However, while H. hamamelidis is autoecious and has three generations in a year, H. cornu lays eggs on both witch-hazel and river birch and has seven generations in year. H. hamamelidis is often found at higher elevations, while H. cornu is typically observed at lower elevations. The two species readily interbreed, but hybrids are probably inviable.

Like galls formed by other insects, the galls of H. hamamelidis may deter herbivory.

== Life history ==
The first generation of the year is composed entirely of female fundatrices (also called stem mothers), which hatch from winter eggs laid on the bark of witch-hazel. Shortly following bud break, she begins to feed on leaf tissue. She then repeatedly “stings” the abaxial surface of the leaf to induce gall formation. A gall forms around her approximately 7–14 mm tall on the adaxial (upper) side of the leaf. She then reproduces around 45 female offspring through parthenogenesis.

The second generation consists of alate sexuparae, which are winged females. As the second generation matures within the gall, the stem mother and juveniles feed on witch-hazel phloem and push waxy detritus through the gall opening on the leaf's underside. All the offspring from a given gall mature at the same time and become winged migrants. At maturity, the females leave the gall and begin to lay the eggs of the third generation on surrounding leaves, often on the same plant that they emerged from.

The third generation comprises both male and female sexuales. Individuals begin mating after their final molt. Mating may occur on the leaves where the aphids hatched or on the plant's winter buds. There, females deposit between five and ten eggs, which remain throughout the winter.

== Gall formation ==
The process of “stinging” the leaf to induce gall formation is distinct from normal feeding behavior. While feeding occurs seemingly haphazardly, a stem mother must repeatedly sting a site over some time to induce gall growth. When stinging, the aphid repeatedly inserts her stylets into the leaf over a small circular area. She injects a substance produced in glands near the stylar canal. This substance is distinct from saliva, and the cells of the leaf respond rapidly.

Higher fecundity is linked to larger gall size, as well as increased levels of condensed tannins. Galls also have higher vacuolar invertase activity than surrounding leaf tissue, and greater cell wall invertase activity is positively correlated with fecundity.
