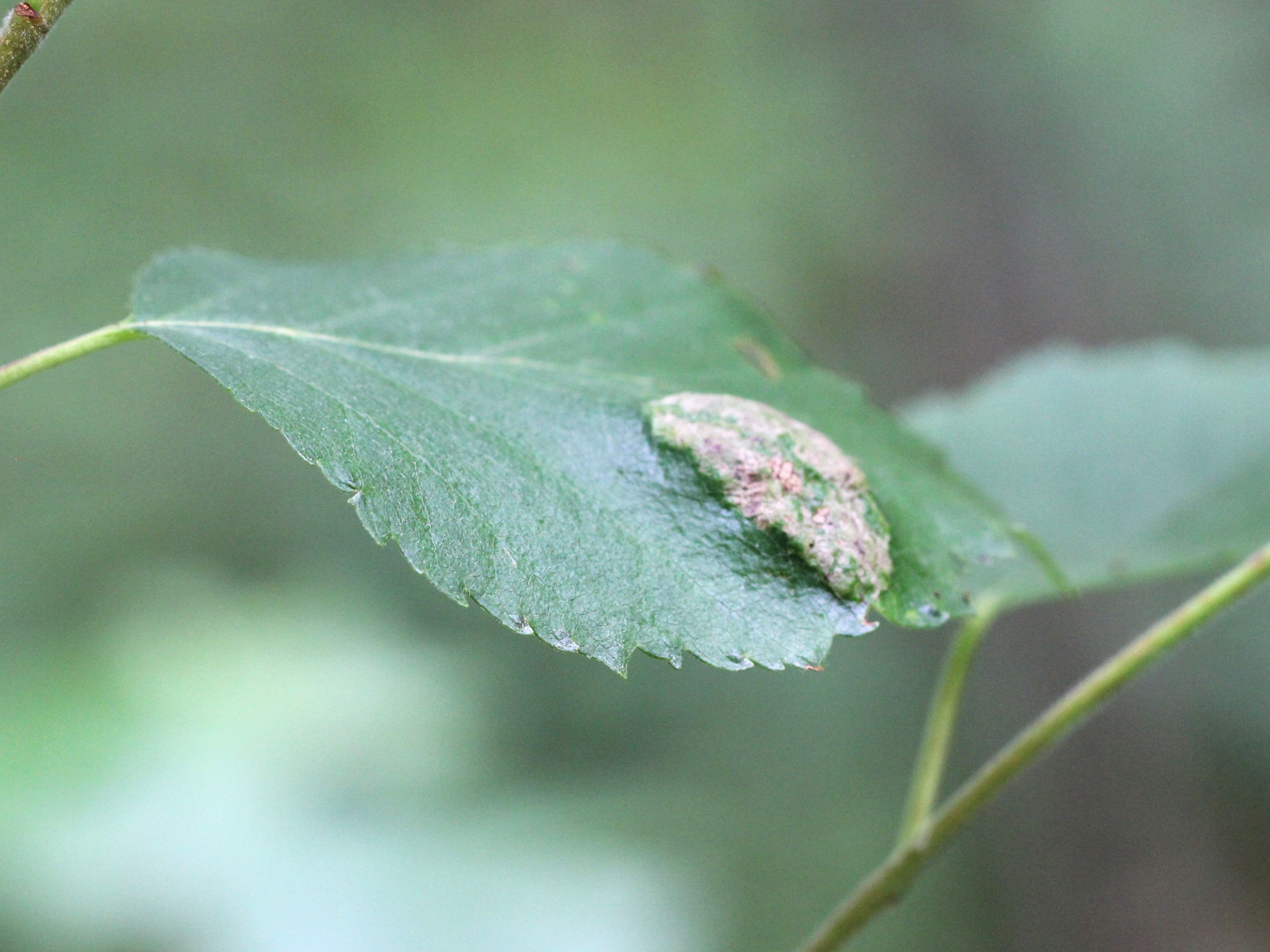

Scientific classification
- Kingdom: Animalia
- Phylum: Arthropoda
- Class: Insecta
- Order: Hemiptera
- Suborder: Sternorrhyncha
- Family: Aphididae
- Genus: Hamamelistes; Shimer, 1867

= Hamamelistes =

Genus of true bugs

Hamamelistes is a genus of true bugs belonging to the family Aphididae.

The species of this genus are found in Europe and North America.

Species:

- Hamamelistes betulinus (de Horváth, 1896)
- Hamamelistes cristafoliae (Monzen, 1954)
- Hamamelistes spinosus(Shimer, 1867) — Spiny Witch-Hazel Gall Aphid
