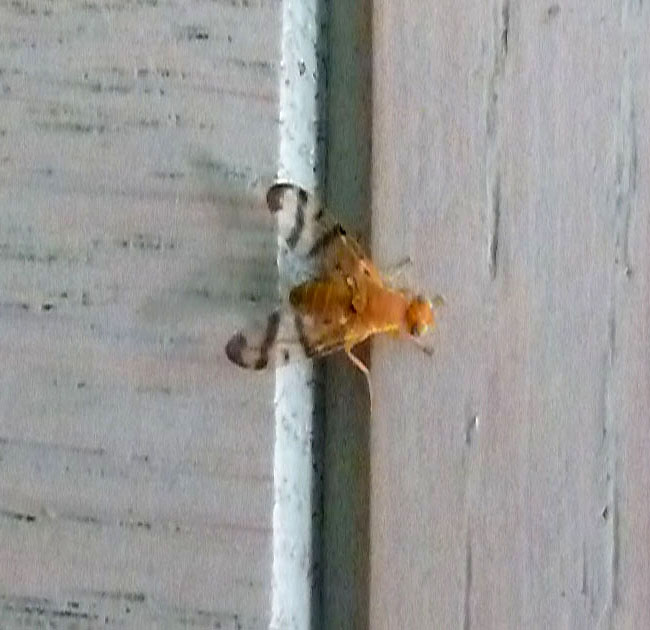

Scientific classification
- Kingdom: Animalia
- Phylum: Arthropoda
- Class: Insecta
- Order: Diptera
- Family: Tephritidae
- Genus: Rhagoletis
- Species: R. basiola

Binomial name
- Rhagoletis basiola (Osten Sacken, 1877)

= Rhagoletis basiola =

Species of insect

Rhagoletis basiola is a species of tephritid or fruit flies in the genus Rhagoletis of the family Tephritidae.
