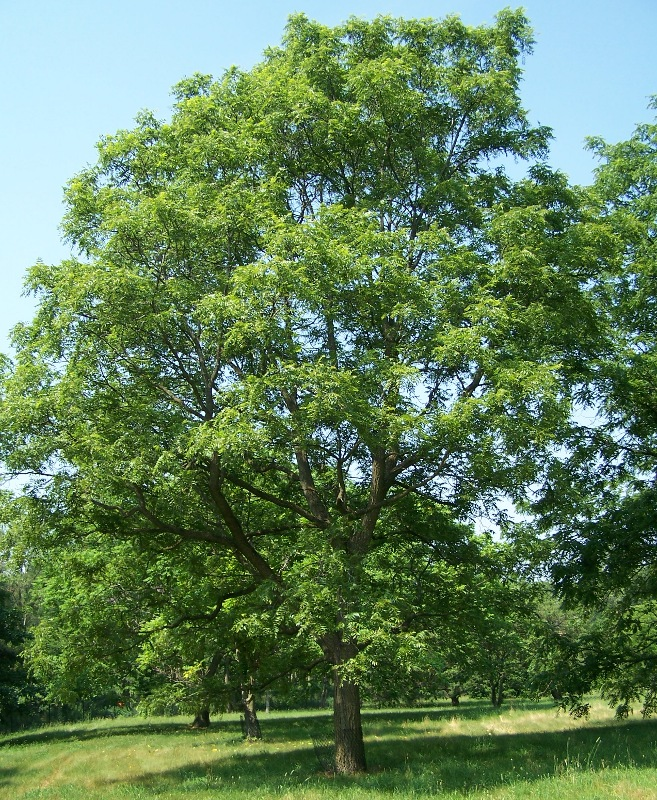
- Juglans major

Scientific classification
- Kingdom: Plantae
- Clade: Tracheophytes
- Clade: Angiosperms
- Clade: Eudicots
- Clade: Rosids
- Order: Fagales
- Family: Juglandaceae
- Subfamily: Juglandoideae
- Tribe: Juglandeae
- Subtribe: Juglandinae; D.E.Stone & P.S.Manos

Type genus
- Juglans L.

Genera
- Cyclocarya; Juglans; Pterocarya

= Juglandinae =

Subtribe of flowering plants

Juglandinae is a subtribe of the Juglandeae tribe, of the Juglandoideae subfamily, in the Juglandaceae family. Walnut tree species make up the genus Juglans, which belongs to the subtribe Juglandinae.

== Genera and species ==
Image	Genus	Living species
	Cyclocarya Iljinsk.	Cyclocarya paliurus - wheel wingnut
	Juglans L.	J. ailantifolia Carr. – Japanese walnut; J. mandshurica Maxim. – Manchurian walnut or Chinese walnut; J. regia L. – common walnut, Persian, English, or Carpathian walnut; J. sigillata Dode – iron walnut; J. australis Griseb. – Argentine walnut, Brazilian walnut; J. boliviana (C. DC.) Dode – Bolivian walnut, Peruvian walnut; J. californica S.Wats. – California black walnut; J. hindsii (Jepson) R.E.Smith – Hinds' black walnut; J. hirsuta Manning – Nuevo León walnut; J. jamaicensis C.DC. – West Indies walnut; J. major (Torrey) Heller – Arizona black walnut; J. microcarpa Berlandier – Texas black walnut; J. mollis Engelm. – Mexican walnut; J. neotropica Diels – Andean walnut; J. nigra L. – Eastern black walnut; J. olanchana Standl. & L.O.Williams – cedro negro, nogal, walnut; J. soratensis Manning; J. steyermarkii Manning – Guatemalan walnut; J. venezuelensis Manning – Venezuelan walnut; J. cinerea L. – Butternut
	Pterocarya	Pterocarya fraxinifolia - Caucasian wingnut; Pterocarya hupehensis - Hubei wingnut; Pterocarya macroptera - Large-winged wingnut; Pterocarya rhoifolia - Japanese wingnut; Pterocarya stenoptera - Chinese wingnut; Pterocarya tonkinensis - Tonkin wingnut

== Extinct genera ==
- Antarctoxylon Poole & Cantrill, 2001
- Pterocaryoxylon Müller-Stool & Mädel
