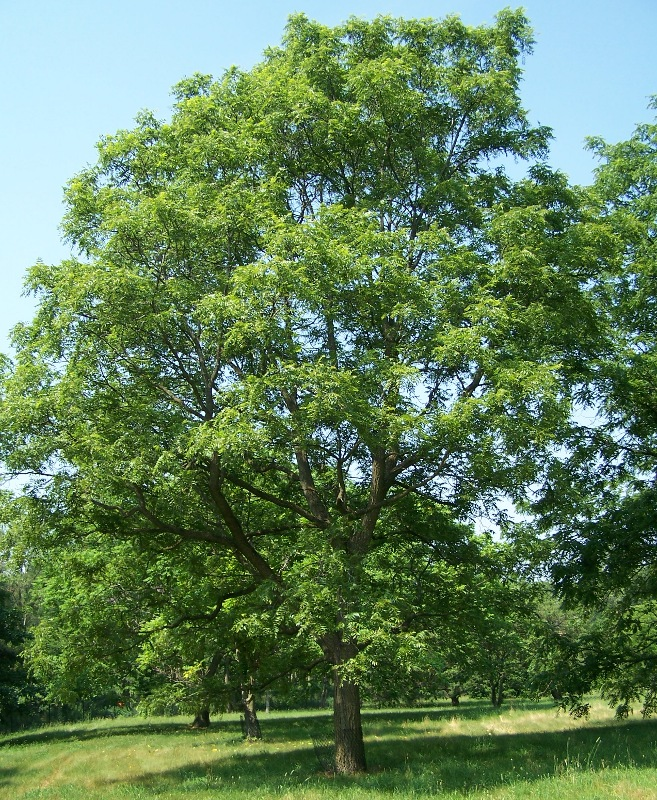
- Juglans major Morton Arboretum acc. 614-47*1

Scientific classification
- Kingdom: Plantae
- Clade: Tracheophytes
- Clade: Angiosperms
- Clade: Eudicots
- Clade: Rosids
- Order: Fagales
- Family: Juglandaceae
- Subfamily: Juglandoideae
- Tribe: Juglandeae; Nakai

Subtribes
- Caryinae; Juglandinae

= Juglandeae =

Tribe of flowering plants

Juglandeae is a tribe of the Juglandoideae subfamily, in the Juglandaceae family.

Walnut tree species comprise the Juglans genus, which belong to the Juglandeae tribe.

Tribe Juglandeae
Subtribe Caryinae

- Carya Nutt. – hickory and pecan
- Annamocarya A.Chev.

Subtribe Juglandinae

- Cyclocarya Iljinsk – wheel wingnut
- Juglans L. – walnut
- Pterocarya Kunth – wingnut
- †Antarctoxylon? Poole & Cantrill, 2001
