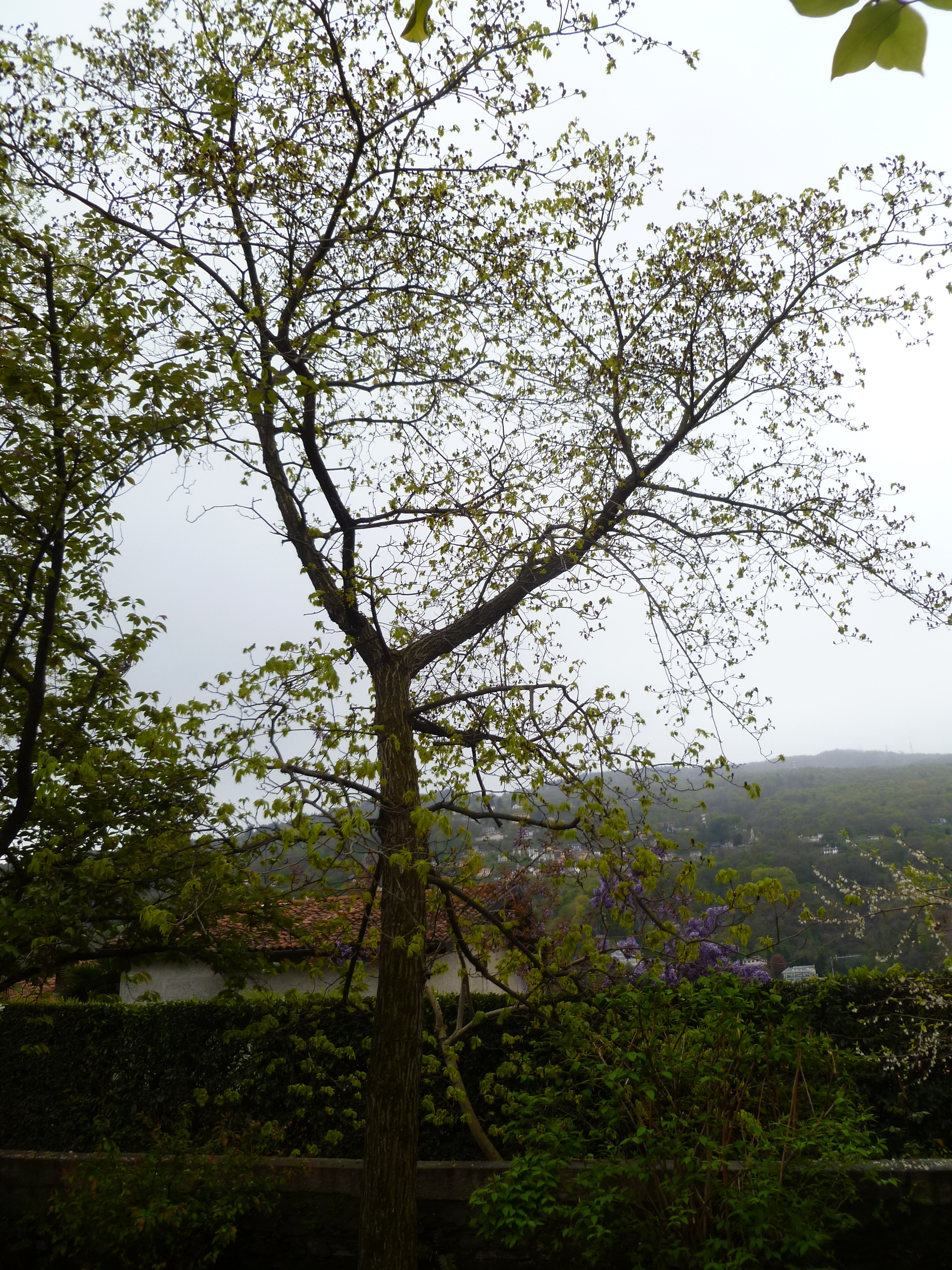
- Platycarya strobilacea tree

Scientific classification
- Kingdom: Plantae
- Clade: Tracheophytes
- Clade: Angiosperms
- Clade: Eudicots
- Clade: Rosids
- Order: Fagales
- Family: Juglandaceae
- Subfamily: Juglandoideae
- Tribe: Platycaryeae; Nakai

Type genus
- Platycarya; Siebold & Zucc.

Other genera
- †Clarnoxylon Manchester & Wheeler; †Hooleya E.Reid & M.Chandler; †Palaeoplatycarya Manchester; †Platycarypollenites (Nagy) Frederiksen & Christopher; †Pterocaryopsis M.Chandler; †Vinea Wolfe

= Platycaryeae =

Platycaryeae Temporal range: Early Paleocene–Recent

Tribe of walnut family plants

Platycaryeae is a tribe of flowering plants in the family Juglandaceae, and comprising a single living genus Platycarya. The tribe is now native to eastern Asia in China, Korea, and Japan.

A series of fossil genera have been described from the Northern Hemisphere dating between the Early Eocene, and gradually becoming confined to East Asia during the Pleistocene ice ages. The fossil record is dominated by morphotaxa based on plant material, with isolated fruit, foliage, leaves, pollen, and woods in segregate mophogenera.

== Genera ==
- Platycarya Siebold & Zucc.
- †Clarnoxylon
  Manchester & Wheeler (wood morphotaxon)
- †Hooleya E.Reid & M.Chandler (fruit morphotaxon)
- †Palaeoplatycarya Manchester (fruit morphotaxon)
- †Platycarypollenites (Nagy) Frederiksen & Christopher (pollen morphotaxon)
- †Pterocaryopsis M.Chandler (fruit morphotaxon)
- †Vinea Wolfe (leaf morphotaxon)
