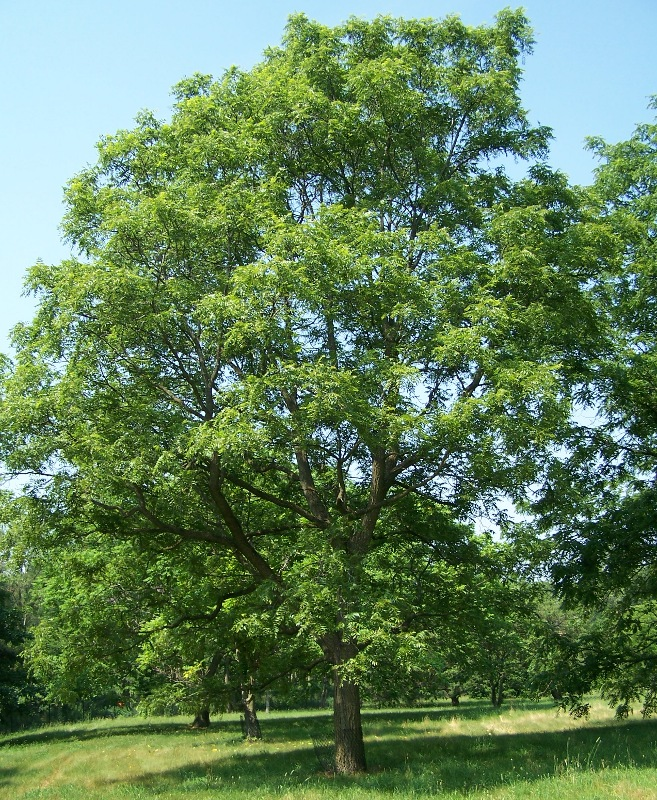
- Juglans major Morton Arboretum acc. 614-47*1

Scientific classification
- Kingdom: Plantae
- Clade: Tracheophytes
- Clade: Angiosperms
- Clade: Eudicots
- Clade: Rosids
- Order: Fagales
- Family: Juglandaceae
- Subfamily: Juglandoideae; Eaton

Tribes
- Platycaryeae; Juglandeae
- The range of subfamily Juglandoideae.

= Juglandoideae =

Subfamily of flowering plants

Juglandoideae is a subfamily of the walnut family Juglandaceae.

This clade was first described by Koidzumi in 1937 by the name "Drupoideae," based on the drupe-like fruits of Juglans and Carya. This name was rejected because it was not based on the name of the type genus. Leroy (1955) and Melchior (1964) both published descriptions of the clade using the name "Jugandoideae," but both were deemed invalid due to technicalities. The first valid publication of the name was by Manning (1978).

- Subfamily Juglandoideae Manning (1978)
  - Tribe Caryeae Koidz. (1937)
    - Carya Nutt. – hickory and pecan
    - Annamocarya A.Chev.
    - Platycarya Siebold & Zucc.
  - Tribe Juglandeae Nakai (1933)
    - Cyclocarya Iljinsk – wheel wingnut
    - Juglans L. – walnut
    - Pterocarya Kunth – wingnut

Manos and Stone (2001) proposed the following reorganization to reflect a more probable phylogenetic relationship that shows that Platycarya is sister to the rest of the subfamily, while Manchester (1987) addressed the fossil record of the subfamily:

Subfamily Juglandoideae Manning (1978)

- Tribe Platycaryeae Nakai (1933)
  - †Hooleya E.Reid & M.Chandler
  - †Palaeoplatycarya Manchester
  - Platycarya Siebold & Zucc.
  - †Platycarypollenites (Nagy) Frederiksen & Christopher
  - †Pterocaryopsis M.Chandler
  - †Vinea Wolfe
- Tribe Juglandeae Nakai (1933)
  - Subtribe Caryinae Stone & Manos (2001)
    - Annamocarya A.Chev.
    - Carya Nutt. – hickory and pecan
    - †Caryapollenites (Raatz) Potonié
    - †Eucaryoxylon Müller-Stoll & Mädel
    - †Juglandicarya E.Reid & M.Chandler
  - Subtribe Juglandinae Stone & Manos (2001)
    - Cyclocarya Iljinsk – wheel wingnut
    - Juglans L. – walnut
    - Pterocarya Kunth – wingnut
    - †Pterocaryoxylon Müller-Stoll & Mädel
- Tribe Incertae sedis
  - †Boreocarya Doweld
  - †Cruciptera Manchester
  - †Globocarya Doweld
  - †Polyptera Manchester & Dilcher
