= Carya kweichowensis =

Scientific classification
- Kingdom: Plantae
- Clade: Tracheophytes
- Clade: Angiosperms
- Clade: Eudicots
- Clade: Rosids
- Order: Fagales
- Family: Juglandaceae
- Genus: Carya
- Species: C. kweichowensis

Binomial name
- Carya kweichowensis Kuang & A.M.Lu

Species of plant

Carya kweichowensis is a species of flowering plant in the family Juglandaceae, native to southwestern Guizhou, China. A montane forest tree reaching 20 m (66 ft), it is closely related to Carya sinensis.
