= Juglans boliviana =

Scientific classification
- Kingdom: Plantae
- Clade: Tracheophytes
- Clade: Angiosperms
- Clade: Eudicots
- Clade: Rosids
- Order: Fagales
- Family: Juglandaceae
- Genus: Juglans
- Section: Juglans sect. Rhysocaryon
- Species: J. boliviana

Binomial name
- Juglans boliviana (C. DC.) Dode

Synonyms
- Juglans nigra var. boliviana C. DC. Juglans peruviana Dode

Species of tree

Juglans boliviana, also known as Bolivian walnut, is a tree in the family Juglandaceae. According to a paper in 1960 entitled The Genus Juglans in South America and the West Indies by American horticulturist and botanist Wayne Eyer Manning, it occurs in the Andes of northern Bolivia.

Wayne Manning included the species Juglans peruviana, described by French botanist Louis-Albert Dode in 1909 from nuts collected at an unknown locality in Peru, because the nuts closely match those of J. boliviana and apparently came from Metraro, where only J. boliviana is known.

== Literature cited ==
- Manning, W.E. (1960). "The genus Juglans in South America and the West Indies". Brittonia. 12 (1): 1–26. doi:10.2307/2805331. JSTOR 2805331. S2CID 8100965.
