= Carya sinensis =

Conservation status
- Endangered (IUCN 2.3)

Scientific classification
- Kingdom: Plantae
- Clade: Tracheophytes
- Clade: Angiosperms
- Clade: Eudicots
- Clade: Rosids
- Order: Fagales
- Family: Juglandaceae
- Subfamily: Juglandoideae
- Tribe: Juglandeae
- Subtribe: Caryinae
- Genus: Carya
- Species: C. sinensis

Binomial name
- Carya sinensis Dode

Synonyms
- List: Annamocarya indochinensis (A.Chev.) A.Chev.; Annamocarya sinensis (Dode) J.-F.Leroy; Carya indochinensis (A.Chev.) W.E.Manning & Hjelmq.; Carya integrifoliolata (Kuang) Hjelmq.; Juglandicarya integrifoliolata (Kuang) Hu; Juglans indochinensis A.Chev.; Rhamphocarya integrifoliolata Kuang

Species of plant

Carya sinensis (syn. Annamocarya sinensis) is a species of tree native to southwestern China (Guangxi, Guizhou, Yunnan) and northern Vietnam, in the hickory genus Carya. It is sometimes called Chinese hickory or beaked hickory. It is closely related to Carya kweichowensis.

It is a medium-sized to large evergreen tree growing to 30 m (98 ft) tall. The leaves are 30–50 cm (12–20 in) long, and pinnate with 7–11 leaflets. The leaflets have an entire margin, which distinguishes it from other Carya, where the leaflets have a serrated margin. The flowers are catkins produced in spring, with the male catkins in clusters of five to eight together (single in other Carya). The fruit is a nut 6–8 cm (2.4–3.1 in) long and 4–6 cm (1.6–2.4 in) broad, with a prominent, acute beak at the apex.
