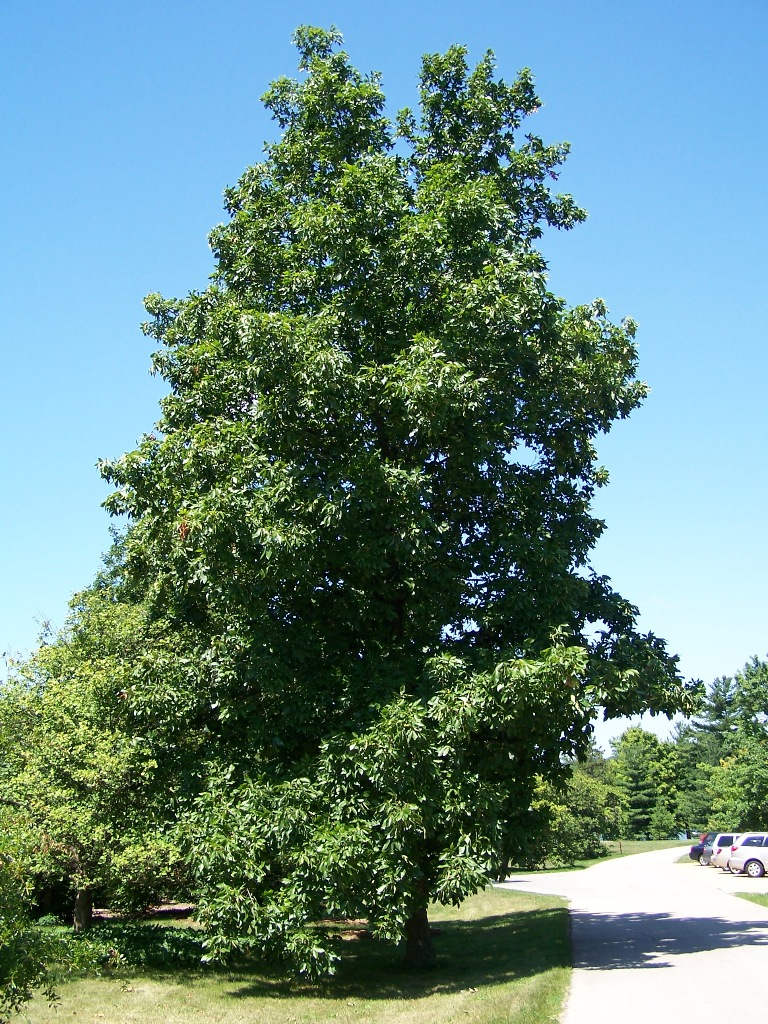
- Hickory at Morton Arboretum; Accession 29-U-10

Scientific classification
- Kingdom: Plantae
- Clade: Tracheophytes
- Clade: Angiosperms
- Clade: Eudicots
- Clade: Rosids
- Order: Fagales
- Family: Juglandaceae
- Subfamily: Juglandoideae
- Tribe: Juglandeae
- Subtribe: Caryinae; Manos & Stone

Type genus
- Carya Nutt.

Genera
- Carya; Annamocarya

= Caryinae =

Subtribe of flowering plants

Caryinae is a subtribe of the tribe Juglandeae subfamily in the Juglandaceae family.

The Latin description of this subtribe is as follows:

Medulla solida; pollenis grana 3-pora; bracteolae pis- tillatae 2 (ve1 3–5), ad apicem ovarii connatae; positio carpellorum transversa (sensu Manningii); stigmata com- missuralia; papillae stigmnaticae paginam stigmatis brevis, rotundati tegentes, stylo obsolete.
