= Juglans venezuelensis =

Conservation status
- Endangered (IUCN 3.1)

Scientific classification
- Kingdom: Plantae
- Clade: Embryophytes
- Clade: Tracheophytes
- Clade: Angiosperms
- Clade: Eudicots
- Clade: Rosids
- Order: Fagales
- Family: Juglandaceae
- Genus: Juglans
- Section: Juglans sect. Rhysocaryon
- Species: J. venezuelensis

Binomial name
- Juglans venezuelensis W.E.Manning

Species of tree

Juglans venezuelensis, or nogal de Caracas, is a species of black walnut endemic to Venezuela. It is a small tree which bears 1 inch nuts.

== Phenology ==
Juglans venezuelensis is deciduous, with a period of leaf fall between November and December, and a period of regrowth of leaves between January and February. Flowering begins in late February.

The species is monoecious, male flowers are hanging catkins and female ones are erect, both are small and greenish.

The fruits are drupes with yellow epicarp and abundant pubescence. The fruit is about 3 inches diameter and 1.5 cm walnut, weighing 150 grams on average.

== Distribution ==
Juglans venezuelensis is endemic to Cerro El Avila in the Cordillera de la Costa of Venezuela. Currently there are two known wild populations of less than 100 individuals in the sector and the sector Canoes Summit Hoyo de Avila National Park.

== Conservation ==
Since 2004 there have been days of transplanting young individuals germinated in nurseries to reforest areas of the Camino de los Españoles, El Vigia and Guayabitos within the National Park and surrounding regions as Altos de Pipe.
