= Horsetail tree =

Horsetail tree may refer to:

- Rhoiptelea, a mountainous genus
- Casuarina equisetifolia, a coastal species
