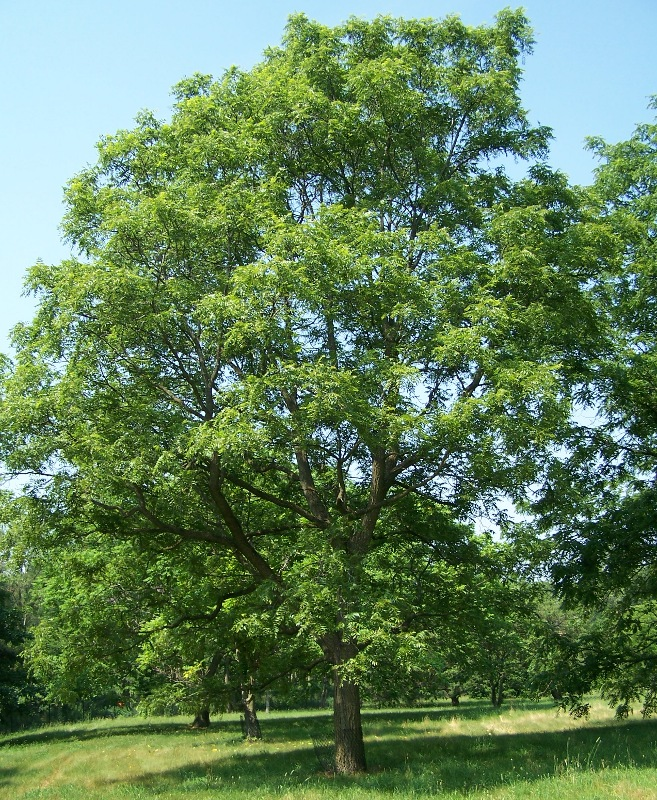
- Juglans major Morton Arboretum acc. 614-47*1

Scientific classification
- Kingdom: Plantae
- Clade: Tracheophytes
- Clade: Angiosperms
- Clade: Eudicots
- Clade: Rosids
- Order: Fagales
- Family: Juglandaceae
- Subfamily: Juglandoideae
- Tribe: Juglandeae
- Subtribe: Juglandinae
- Genus: Juglans; L.

Type species
- Juglans regia

Species
- See text
- Native ranges of Juglans spp.

Synonyms
- Wallia Alef

= Juglans =

Genus of trees

Walnut trees are any species of tree in the plant genus Juglans, the type genus of the family Juglandaceae, the seeds of which are referred to as walnuts. All species are deciduous trees, 10–40 metres (33–131 ft) tall, with pinnate leaves 200–900 millimetres (7.9–35.4 in), with 5–25 leaflets; the shoots have chambered pith, a character shared with the wingnuts (Pterocarya), but not the hickories (Carya) in the same family.

The 21 species in the genus range across the north temperate Old World from southeast Europe east to Japan, and more widely in the New World from southeast Canada west to California and south to Argentina.

Edible walnuts, which are consumed worldwide, are usually harvested from cultivated varieties of the species Juglans regia. China produces half of the world total of walnuts.

== Etymology ==
The common name walnut derives from Old English wealhhnutu, literally 'foreign nut' (from wealh 'foreign' + hnutu 'nut'), because it was introduced from Gaul and Italy. The Latin name for the walnut was nux Gallica, "Gallic nut". The name Juglans was apparently conjured by Linnaeus himself, replacing the prior Nux, by combining Ju from Jupiter with the Latin glans meaning 'acorn', referring to the association of the plant with Jupiter by the Romans.

== Folklore ==
Tradition has it that a walnut tree should be beaten. This would have the benefit of removing dead wood and stimulating shoot formation.

== Production ==
Walnut (in shell) production – 2017
Country	(tonnes)
China	1,925,403
United States	571,526
Iran	349,192
Turkey	210,000
Mexico	147,198
Ukraine	108,660
World	3,829,626
Source: FAOSTAT of the United Nations

In 2017, world production of walnuts (in shell) was 3.8 million tonnes, led by China with producing half of the world total (table). Other major producers were the United States (15%) and Iran (9%).

== Cultivation and uses ==
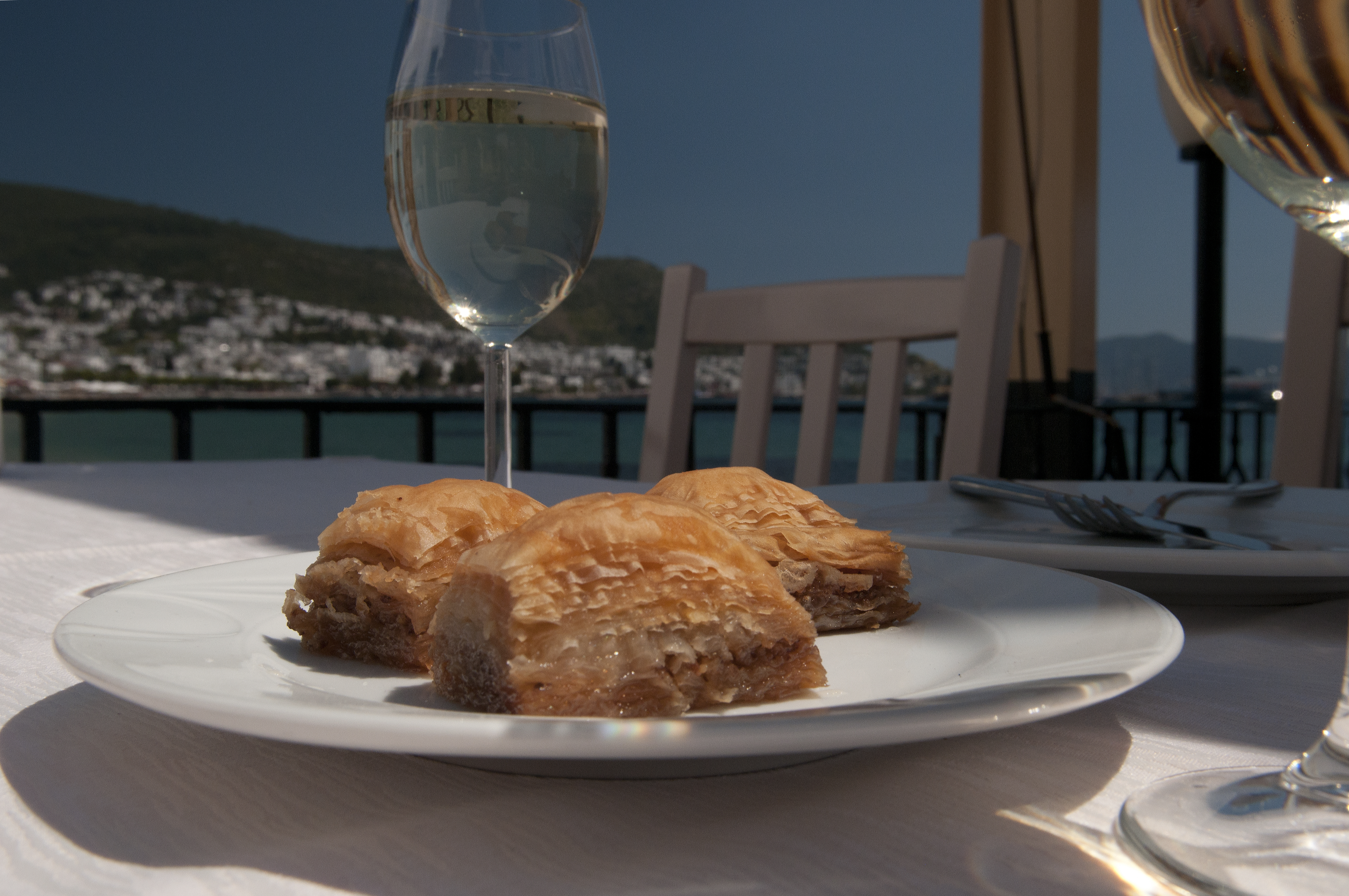
Walnut is one of the main ingredients of Baklava and Turkish cuisine.

The two most commercially important species are J. regia for timber and nuts, and J. nigra for timber. Both species have similar cultivation requirements and are widely grown in temperate zones.

Walnuts are light-demanding species that benefit from protection from wind. Walnuts are also very hardy against drought.

Interplanting walnut plantations with a nitrogen fixing plant, such as Elaeagnus × ebbingei or Elaeagnus umbellata, and various Alnus species, results in a 30% increase in tree height and girth (Hemery 2001).

When grown for nuts, care must be taken to select cultivars that are compatible for pollination purposes; although some cultivars are marketed as "self fertile", they will generally fruit better with a different pollination partner. Many different cultivars are available for growers, and offer different growth habits, flowering and leafing, kernel flavours and shell thicknesses. A key trait for more northerly latitudes of North America and Europe is phenology, with ‘late flushing’ being particularly important to avoid frost damage in spring. Some cultivars have been developed for novel ‘hedge’ production systems developed in Europe and would not suit more traditional orchard systems.

=== Flowers ===
The leaves and blossoms of the walnut tree normally appear in spring. The male cylindrical catkins are developed from leafless shoots from the past year; they are about 10 cm (3.9 in) in length and have a large number of little flowers. Female flowers appear in a cluster at the peak of the current year’s leafy shoots.

=== Fruit ===
The fruits of the walnut are a type of accessory fruit known as a pseudodrupe (or drupe-like nut), the outer covering of the fruit is an involucre – in a drupe the covering would be derived from the carpel.

==== Nuts and kernels ====
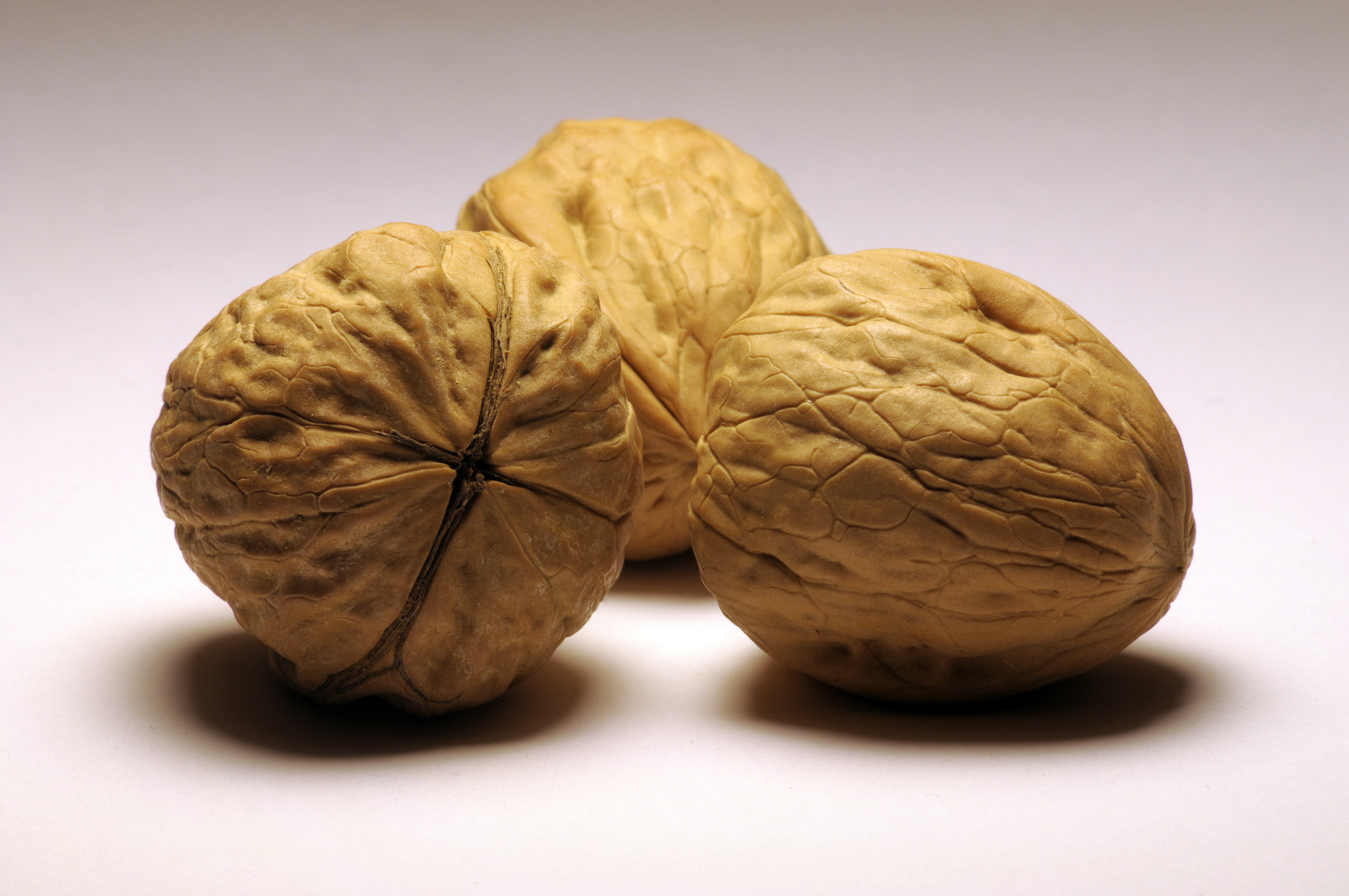
Persian walnut (Juglans regia) seeds

The nut kernels of all the species are edible, but the walnuts most commonly traded are from J. regia, the only species which has a large nut and thin shell. The kernels of J. nigra are also produced commercially in the US.

Two-thirds of the world export market and 99% of US walnuts are grown in California's Central Valley and in Coastal Valleys, from Redding in the north to Bakersfield in the south. Of the more than 30 varieties of J. regia grown there, Chandler and Hartley account for over half of total production. In California commercial production, the Hinds' black walnut (J. hindsii) and the hybrid between J. hindsii and J. regia, Juglans x paradox, are widely used as rootstocks for J. regia cultivars because of their resistance to Phytophthora and to a very limited degree, the oak root fungus. However, trees grafted on these rootstocks often succumb to black line.

In some countries, immature nuts in their husks are preserved in vinegar. In the UK, these are called pickled walnuts and this is one of the major uses for fresh nuts from the small scale plantings. In Armenian cuisine, unripe walnuts, including husks, are preserved in sugar syrup and eaten whole. In Italy, liqueurs called Nocino and Nocello are flavoured with walnuts, while Salsa di Noci (walnut sauce) is a pasta sauce originating from Liguria. In Georgia, walnuts are ground with other ingredients to make walnut sauce.

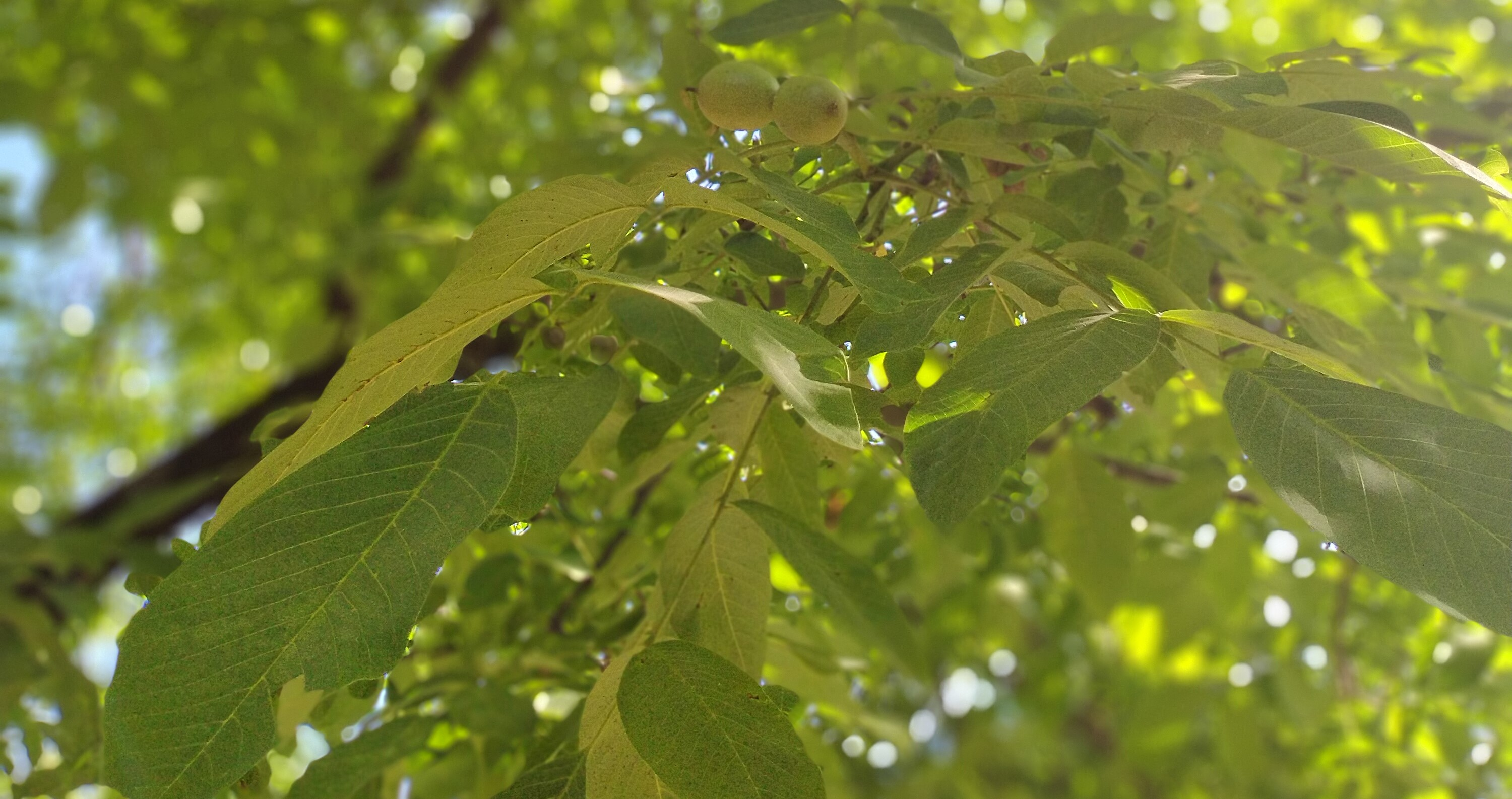
Green leaves of a walnut tree with budding walnuts, in Kashmir Valley.

Walnuts are heavily used in India. In Jammu, they are used widely as a prasad (offering) to Mother Goddess Vaisnav Devi and, generally, as a dry food in the season of festivals such as Diwali.

The nuts are rich in oil, and are widely eaten both fresh and in cookery. Walnut oil is expensive and consequently is used sparingly; most often in salad dressings. Walnut oil has been used in oil paint, as an effective binding medium, known for its clear, glossy consistency and nontoxicity.

Manos and Stone studied the composition of seed oils from several species of the Rhoipteleaceae and Juglandaceae and found the nut oils were generally more unsaturated from species which grow in the temperate zones and more saturated for species which grow in the tropical zones. In the northerly-growing section Trachycaryon, J. cinerea oil was reported to contain 15% linolenate (the report did not specify whether the linolenate was the alpha (n-3) or gamma (n-6) isomer, or perhaps a mixture), 2% of saturated palmitate, and a maximum concentration of 71% linoleate. In the section Juglans, J. regia nut oil was found to contain from 10% to 11% linolenate, 6% to 7% palmitate, and a maximum concentration of linoleate (62% to 68%). In the section Cardiocaryon, the nut oils of J. ailantifolia and J. mandshurica were reported to contain (respectively) 7% and 5% of linolenate, 2% of palmitate, and maximum concentrations of 74% and 79% linoleate. Within the section Rhysocaryon, the nut oils of the U.S. native black walnuts J. microcarpa and J. nigra were reported to contain (respectively) 7% and 3% linolenate, 4% and 3% palmitate, and 70% and 69% linoleate. The remaining results for black walnuts were: J. australis contained 2% linolenate, 7% palmitate, and 61% linoleate; J. boliviana contained 4% linolenate, 4% palmitate, and 70% linoleate; J. hirsuta contained 2% linolenate, 5% palmitate, and 75% linoleate; J. mollis contained 0% linolenate, 5% palmitate, 46% linoleate, and 49% oleate; J. neotropica contained 3% linolenate, 5% palmitate, and 50% linoleate; and J. olanchana contained only a trace of linolenate, 9% palmitate, and 73% linoleate;

==== Shells ====
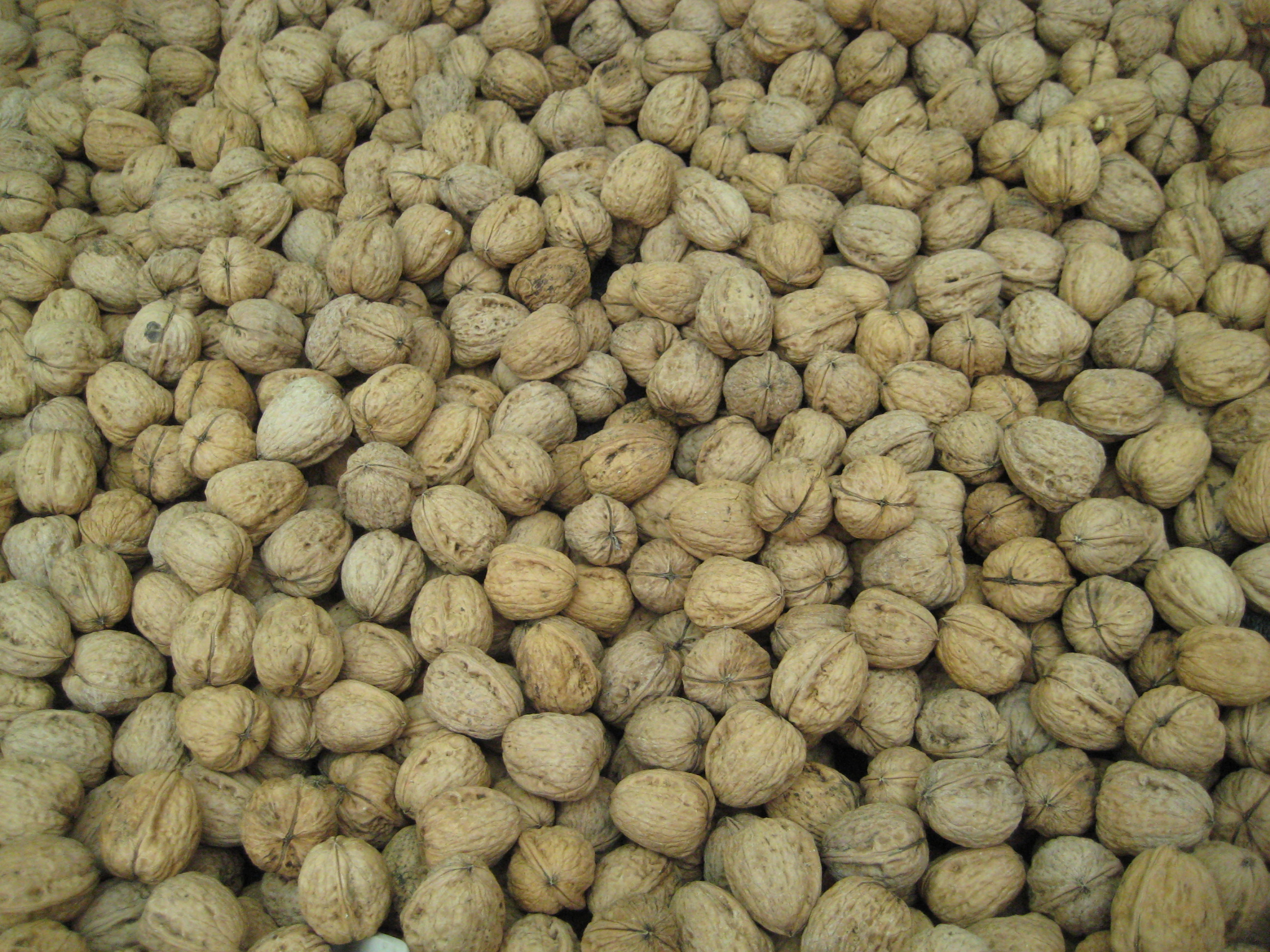
The shells of walnuts

The walnut shell has a wide variety of uses. Eastern black walnut (J. nigra) shell is the hardest of the walnut shells, and therefore has the highest resistance to breakdown.

Cleansing and polishing
Walnut shells are mostly used to clean soft metals, fiberglass, plastics, wood and stone. This environmentally friendly and recyclable soft grit abrasive is well suited for air blasting, deburring, descaling, and polishing operations because of its elasticity and resilience. Uses include cleaning automobile and jet engines, electronic circuit boards, and paint and graffiti removal. For example: In the early days of jet transportation, crushed walnut shells were used to scour the compressor airfoils clean, but when engines with air cooled vanes and blades in the turbine started being manufactured, this practice was stopped because the crushed shells tended to plug up the cooling passages to the turbine, resulting in turbine failures due to overheating.
Oil well drilling
The shell is used widely in oil well drilling for lost circulation material in making and maintaining seals in fracture zones and unconsolidated formations.
Flour
Flour from walnut shells can be used in thermoplastic starch composites to substitute oil derivatives.
Paint thickener
Walnut shells are added to paint to give it a thicker consistency for "plaster effect" ranges.
Explosives
Used as a filler in dynamite.
Cosmetic cleaner
Occasionally used in soap and exfoliating cleansers.

==== Husks ====
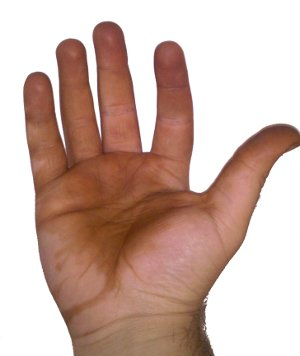
Staining from handling walnuts with husks

Walnut husks are often used to create a rich yellow-brown to dark brown dye used for dyeing fabric, yarn or wood and for other purposes. The dye does not require a mordant and will readily stain the hand if picked without gloves.

=== Wood ===
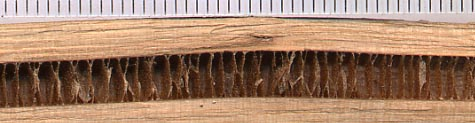
Walnut shoot cut longitudinally to show chambered pith, scale in mm

Timber from walnut trees is hard, dense, tight-grained, and polishes to a smooth finish. The heartwood color is similar to dark chocolate and the sapwood is creamy white, with a distinct boundary between the two. When kiln-dried, walnut wood tends toward a dull brown color, but when air-dried can become a rich purplish-brown. Qualities such as color, hardness, and grain make it desirable to many woodworkers.

When walnut vascular cambium is involved in a crotch (a branch fork), it behaves unusually, producing characteristic "crotch figure" in the wood which it makes. The grain figure exposed when a crotch in a walnut log is cut in the plane of its one entering branch and two exiting branches is attractive and sought after.

There are some differences between the wood of the European walnut (Juglans regia) and the wood of the black walnut (Juglans nigra). For example, Juglans regia wood sometimes has patches with a wavy texture. Black walnut wood tends to be darker than European walnut wood, and can suffer from paler sapwood that only really comes to light when the wood has been planed.

Walnut wood has been the timber of choice for gun makers for centuries, including the Gewehr 98 and Lee–Enfield rifles of the First World War. It remains one of the most popular choices for rifle and shotgun stocks, and is generally considered to be the premium – as well as the most traditional – wood for gun stocks, due to its resilience to compression along the grain. Walnut is also used in lutherie and for the body of pipe organs.

Walnut burls (or "burrs" in the rest of the world) are commonly used to create bowls and other turned pieces. Walnut burl veneer is one of the most valuable and highly prized by cabinet makers and prestige car manufacturers.

The wood of the butternut and related Asian species is of much lower value, softer, coarser, less strong and heavy, and paler in colour.

Freshly sawn walnut heartwood may be greenish in color, but with exposure to air this color quickly changes to brown due to oxidation of the pigment.

In North America, forestry research has been undertaken, mostly on J. nigra, aiming to improve the quality of planting stock and markets. In some areas of the US, black walnut is the most valuable commercial timber species. The Walnut Council is the key body linking growers with scientists. In Europe, various EU-led scientific programmes have studied walnut growing for timber.

The Cherokee Indians would produce a black dye from walnut bark, which they used to dye cloth. As early as the 2nd century CE, shells and kernels of the edible walnut were used to make a dye solution in the Levant.

=== Parkland and garden trees ===
Walnuts are very attractive trees in parks and large gardens. Walnut trees are easily propagated from the nuts. Seedlings grow rapidly on good soils. The Japanese walnut in particular is known for its huge leaves, which have a tropical appearance.

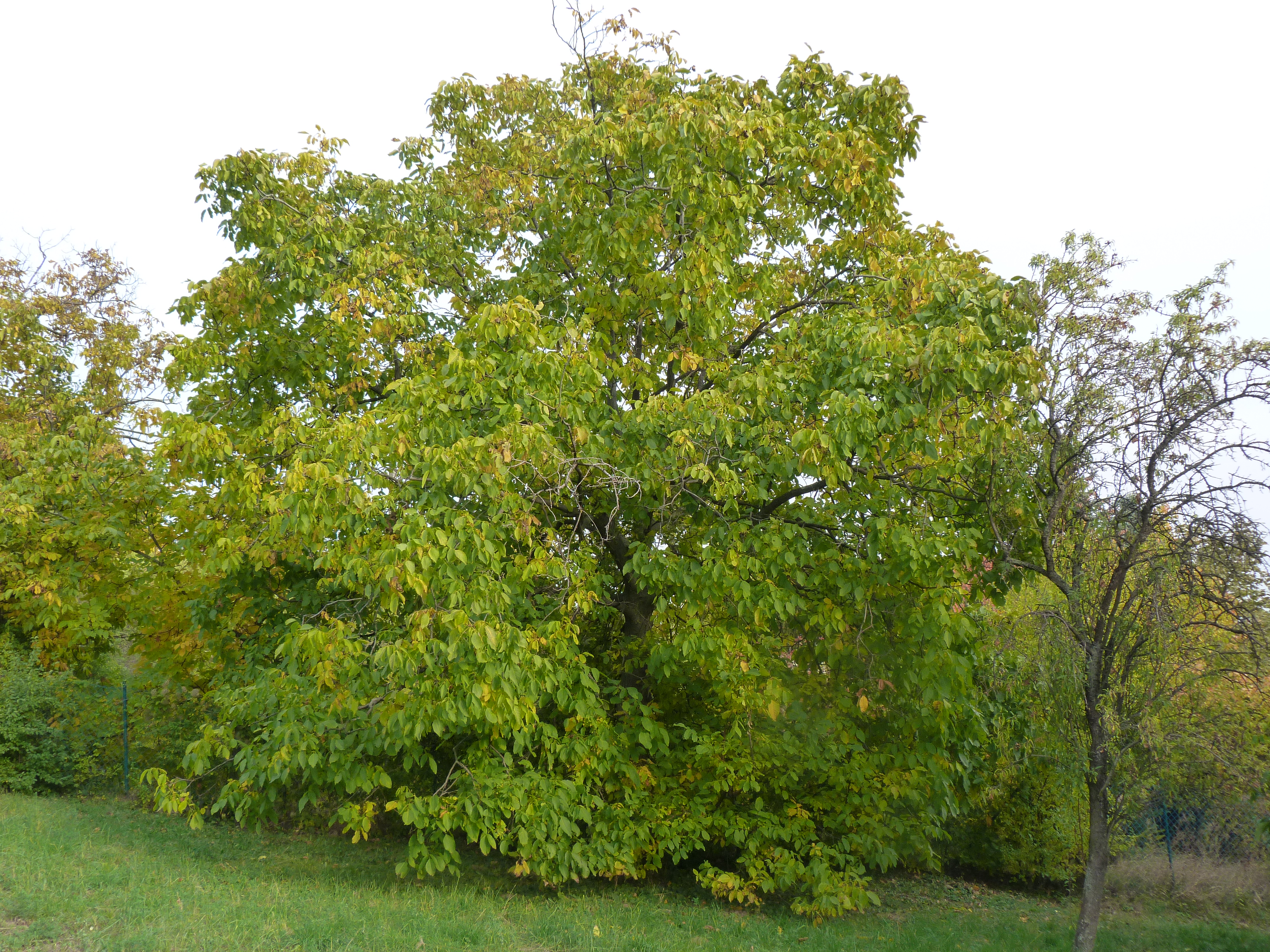
Walnut tree in a garden

As garden trees, they have some drawbacks, in particular the falling nuts, and the releasing of the allelopathic compound juglone, though a number of gardeners do grow them. However, different walnut species vary in the amount of juglone they release from the roots and fallen leaves – J. nigra, in particular, is known for its toxicity, both to plants and horses. Juglone is toxic to plants such as tomato, apple, and birch, and may cause stunting and death of nearby vegetation. Juglone appears to be one of the walnut's primary defence mechanisms against potential competitors for resources (water, nutrients and sunlight), and its effects are felt most strongly inside the tree's "drip line" (the circle around the tree marked by the horizontal distance of its outermost branches). However, even plants at a seemingly great distance outside the drip line can be affected, and juglone can linger in the soil for several years even after a walnut is removed as its roots slowly decompose and release juglone into the soil.

=== Walnut as wildlife food plants ===
Walnut species are used as food plants by the larvae of some Lepidoptera species. These include:

- Brown-tail moth (Euproctis chrysorrhoea)
- Coleophora case-bearers (moths) C. laticornella (recorded on J. nigra) and C. pruniella.
- Common emerald (a geometer moth) (Hemithea aestivaria)
- Small emperor moth (Pavonia pavonia)
- The engrailed (a geometer moth) (Ectropis crepuscularia)
- Walnut sphinx moth (Amorpha juglandis)
- The bride (a moth) (Catocala neogama) – nominate subspecies on butternut and others, C. n. euphemia on Arizona black walnut, perhaps Texas black walnut and others.

The nuts are consumed by other animals, such as mice and squirrels.

In California (US) and Switzerland, crows have been witnessed taking walnuts into their beaks, flying up to 60 feet or so in the air, and dropping them to the ground to crack the shells and eat the nut inside.

== Nutritional information ==
The raw edible seed of walnut is composed of 4% water, 14% carbohydrates, 15% protein, and 65% fat. In a 100 gram amount, walnuts provide 654 calories and are a rich source (≥20% of Daily Value) of protein, dietary fiber, the B vitamins, niacin, vitamin B_{6}, and folate, and several dietary minerals, particularly manganese.

Walnut oil is composed mostly of polyunsaturated fatty acids, particularly alpha-linolenic acid and linoleic acid, although it also contains oleic acid, a monounsaturated fat and 31% of total fat is saturated fat.

== Systematics ==
=== Taxonomy ===
The genus Juglans is divided into four sections.

==== Sections and species ====
Section	Description	Image	Name	Common name	Subspecies	Distribution
Section Cardiocaryon	Leaves are very large (40–90 cm), with 11–19 broad leaflets, softly downy, margins serrated. The wood is soft, and the fruits borne in racemes of up to 20. The nuts have thick shells. Native to northeast Asia.		J. ailantifolia Carr. (J. cordiformis Maxim., J. sieboldiana Maxim.)	Japanese walnut	J. ailantifolia var. cordiformis – Heartnut	Japan and Sakhalin
Section Cardiocaryon	Leaves are very large (40–90 cm), with 11–19 broad leaflets, softly downy, margins serrated. The wood is soft, and the fruits borne in racemes of up to 20. The nuts have thick shells. Native to northeast Asia.		J. mandshurica Maxim. (J. cathayensis Dode, J. formosana Hayata, J. hopeiensis Dode, J. stenocarpa Maxim.)	Manchurian walnut or Chinese walnut		China, Russian Far East, Korea
Section Juglans	Leaves are large (20–45 cm), with 5–9 broad leaflets, hairless, margins entire. The wood is hard. Native to southeast Europe to central Asia.		J. regia L. (J. duclouxiana Dode, J. fallax Dode, J. orientis Dode)	common walnut, Persian, English, or Carpathian walnut		Balkans eastward to Himalaya, China
Section Juglans	Leaves are large (20–45 cm), with 5–9 broad leaflets, hairless, margins entire. The wood is hard. Native to southeast Europe to central Asia.		J. sigillata Dode	iron walnut (doubtfully distinct from J. regia)		China
Section Rhysocaryon (black walnuts)	Leaves are large (20–50 cm), with 11–23 slender leaflets, finely pubescent, margins serrated. Native to North America and South America.		J. australis Griseb. (J. brasiliensis Dode)	Argentine walnut, Brazilian walnut		Argentina, Bolivia
Section Rhysocaryon (black walnuts)	Leaves are large (20–50 cm), with 11–23 slender leaflets, finely pubescent, margins serrated. Native to North America and South America.		J. boliviana (C. DC.) Dode	Bolivian walnut, Peruvian walnut		Andes of Bolivia and Peru
Section Rhysocaryon (black walnuts)	Leaves are large (20–50 cm), with 11–23 slender leaflets, finely pubescent, margins serrated. Native to North America and South America.		J. californica S.Wats.	California black walnut		California
Section Rhysocaryon (black walnuts)	Leaves are large (20–50 cm), with 11–23 slender leaflets, finely pubescent, margins serrated. Native to North America and South America.		J. hindsii (Jepson) R.E.Smith	Hinds' black walnut		California
Section Rhysocaryon (black walnuts)	Leaves are large (20–50 cm), with 11–23 slender leaflets, finely pubescent, margins serrated. Native to North America and South America.		J. hirsuta Manning	Nuevo León walnut		Mexico
Section Rhysocaryon (black walnuts)	Leaves are large (20–50 cm), with 11–23 slender leaflets, finely pubescent, margins serrated. Native to North America and South America.		J. jamaicensis C.DC. (J. insularis Griseb.)	West Indies walnut		Cuba, the Dominican Republic, Haiti, and Puerto Rico
Section Rhysocaryon (black walnuts)	Leaves are large (20–50 cm), with 11–23 slender leaflets, finely pubescent, margins serrated. Native to North America and South America.		J. major (Torrey) Heller (J. arizonica Dode, J. elaeopyron Dode, J. torreyi Dode)	Arizona black walnut	J. major var. glabrata Manning	Mexico, United States
Section Rhysocaryon (black walnuts)	Leaves are large (20–50 cm), with 11–23 slender leaflets, finely pubescent, margins serrated. Native to North America and South America.		J. microcarpa Berlandier (J. rupestris Engelm.)	Texas black walnut	J. microcarpa var. microcarpa; J. microcarpa var. stewartii (Johnston) Manning	United States
Section Rhysocaryon (black walnuts)	Leaves are large (20–50 cm), with 11–23 slender leaflets, finely pubescent, margins serrated. Native to North America and South America.		J. mollis Engelm.	Mexican walnut		Mexico
Section Rhysocaryon (black walnuts)	Leaves are large (20–50 cm), with 11–23 slender leaflets, finely pubescent, margins serrated. Native to North America and South America.		J. neotropica Diels (J. honorei Dode)	Andean walnut, cedro negro, cedro nogal, nogal, nogal Bogotano		Colombia, Ecuador, and Peru
Section Rhysocaryon (black walnuts)	Leaves are large (20–50 cm), with 11–23 slender leaflets, finely pubescent, margins serrated. Native to North America and South America.		J. nigra L.	Eastern black walnut		Canada, United States
Section Rhysocaryon (black walnuts)	Leaves are large (20–50 cm), with 11–23 slender leaflets, finely pubescent, margins serrated. Native to North America and South America.		J. pyriformis Liebm.	cedro negro, nogal, walnut		Central America, Mexico
Section Rhysocaryon (black walnuts)	Leaves are large (20–50 cm), with 11–23 slender leaflets, finely pubescent, margins serrated. Native to North America and South America.		J. soratensis Manning			Bolivia
Section Rhysocaryon (black walnuts)	Leaves are large (20–50 cm), with 11–23 slender leaflets, finely pubescent, margins serrated. Native to North America and South America.		J. steyermarkii Manning	Guatemalan walnut		Guatemala
Section Rhysocaryon (black walnuts)	Leaves are large (20–50 cm), with 11–23 slender leaflets, finely pubescent, margins serrated. Native to North America and South America.		J. venezuelensis Manning	Venezuelan walnut		Venezuela
Section Trachycaryon	Leaves are very large (40–90 cm), with 11–19 broad leaflets, softly downy, margins serrated. The wood is soft. Fruits are borne in clusters of two to three. The nuts have a thick, rough shell bearing distinct, sharp ridges. Native to eastern North America.		J. cinerea L.	Butternut		Canada, United States

The best-known member of the genus is the Persian walnut (J. regia, literally "royal walnut"), native from the Balkans in southeast Europe, southwest and central Asia to the Himalaya and southwest China. Walnuts are a traditional feature of Iranian cuisine; the nation has extensive orchards which are an important feature of regional economies. In Kyrgyzstan alone, there are 230,700 ha of walnut-fruit forest, where J. regia is the dominant overstory tree (Hemery and Popov 1998). In non-European English-speaking nations, the nut of the J. regia is often called the "English walnut"; in Great Britain, the "common walnut".

The eastern black walnut (J. nigra) is a common species in its native eastern North America, and is also widely cultivated elsewhere. The nuts are edible, and though they are often used in expensive baked goods, the Persian walnut is preferred for everyday use because it is easier to extract the nutmeat. The wood is particularly valuable.

The Hinds' black walnut (J. hindsii) is native to northern California, where it has been widely used commercially as a rootstock for J. regia trees. Hinds' black walnut shells do not have the deep grooves characteristic of the eastern black walnut.

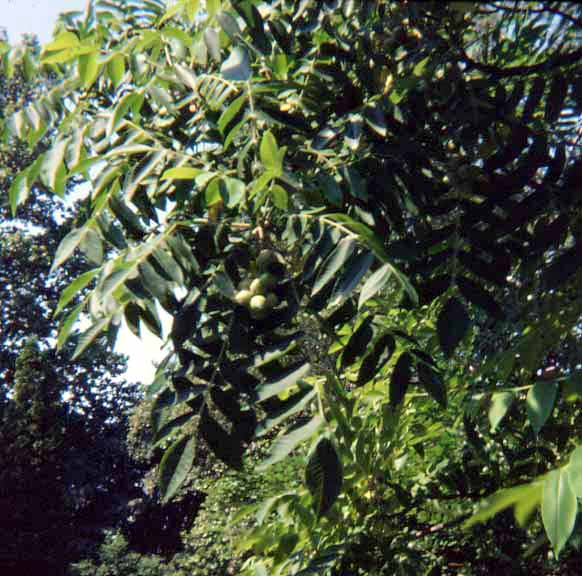
Japanese walnut foliage and nuts

The Japanese walnut (J. ailantifolia) is similar to butternut, distinguished by the larger leaves up to 90 cm (35 in) long, and round (not oval) nuts. The variety cordiformis, often called the heartnut has heart-shaped nuts; the common name of this variety is the source of the sectional name Cardiocaryon.

The butternut (J. cinerea) is also native to eastern North America, where it is currently endangered by an introduced disease, butternut canker, caused by the fungus Sirococcus clavigignenti-juglandacearum. Its leaves are 40–60 cm (16–24 in) long, the fruits are oval, the shell has very tall, very slender ridges, and the kernel is especially high in fat.

==== Hybrids ====
- J. × bixbyi Rehd.—J. ailantifolia x J. cinerea
- J. × intermedia Carr.—J. nigra x J. regia
- J. × notha Rehd.—J. ailantifolia x J. regia
- J. × quadrangulata (Carr.) Rehd.—J. cinerea x J. regia
- J. × sinensis (D. C.) Rehd.—J. mandschurica x J. regia
- J. × paradox Burbank—J. hindsii x J. regia
- J. × royal Burbank—J. hindsii x J. nigra

=== Phylogeny ===
A study of sequenced nuclear DNA from the external transcribed spacer (ETS) of ribosomal DNA (rDNA), the internal transcribed spacer (ITS) of rDNA, and the second intron of the LEAFY gene taken from at least one individual of most of the species of Juglans has supported several conclusions:

- The genus Juglans is monophyletic;
- Sect. Cardiocaryon is sister to Sect. Trachycaryon;
- Sect. Juglans is sister to Sect. Cardiocaryon and Sect. Trachycaryon together;
- Sect. Rhysocaryon is monophyletic and sister to Sect. Juglans, Sect. Cardiocaryon, and Sect. Trachycaryon together;
- Sect. Rhysocaryon, the black walnuts, contains two clades:
  - one comprises the more northerly species J. californica, J. hindsii, J. hirsuta, J. major, J. microcarpa, and J. nigra;
  - the other comprises the more southerly species J. australis, J. boliviana, J. jamaicensis, J. molis, J. neotropica, J. olanchana, J. steyermarkii, and J. venezuelensis
- J. olanchana var. standleyi seems to be more closely related to J. steyermarkii than to J. olanchana var. olanchana, suggesting J. olanchana var. standleyi might be better understood as either a separate species or a variety of J. steyermarkii.

The paper presenting these results did not publish any new names for the subdivisions of sect. Rhysocaryon, for any combinations of the other sections, or for J. olanchana var. standleyi.

== Paleontological history ==
Fossils of Juglans nuts have been described from the Tertiary period of North America. The paleontological history of Juglans regia in Europe shows signs of a post-Ice-Age re-expansíon from refugia in the southeast, much influenced by people carrying walnut nuts about after the numbers of humans had been much increased by the start of agriculture.

== See also ==
- Hickory
- Pecan
