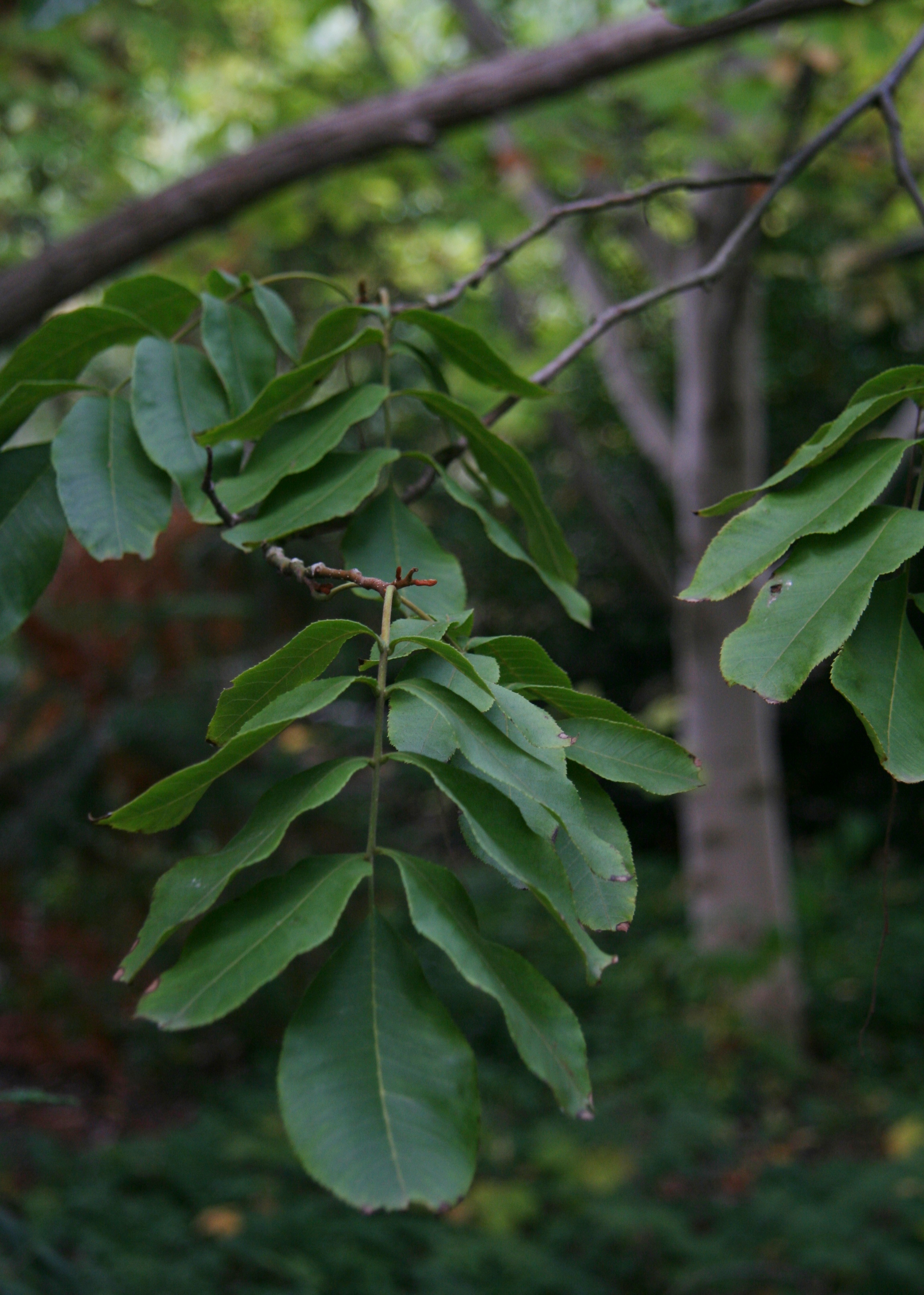

Scientific classification
- Kingdom: Plantae
- Clade: Tracheophytes
- Clade: Angiosperms
- Clade: Eudicots
- Clade: Rosids
- Order: Fagales
- Family: Juglandaceae
- Subfamily: Juglandoideae
- Tribe: Juglandeae
- Subtribe: Juglandinae
- Genus: Cyclocarya; Iljinsk.
- Species: C. paliurus

Binomial name
- Cyclocarya paliurus (Batalin) Iljinsk.

Synonyms
- Pterocarya paliurus Batalin

= Cyclocarya =

Genus of flowering plants

Cyclocarya is a genus of flowering plants in the family Juglandaceae, comprising a single species Cyclocarya paliurus (qing qian liu or wheel wingnut), formerly treated in the genus Pterocarya as Pterocarya paliurus. It is native to eastern and central China.

It is a deciduous tree growing to 30 m tall. The foliage is similar to Pterocarya, with pinnate leaves 20–25 cm long with five to eleven leaflets, the terminal leaflet present; the leaflets are 5–14 cm long and 2–6 cm broad. The flowers are catkins; the male (pollen) catkins are produced in clusters (not singly as in Pterocarya), the female catkins 25–30 cm long at maturity, bearing several small winged nuts with a circular wing 2.5–6 cm diameter right round the nut (instead of two wings at the sides as in Pterocarya).

== Fossil record ==
20 fossil endocarps of †Cyclocarya nemejcii from the early Miocene, have been found in the Kristina Mine at Hrádek nad Nisou in North Bohemia, the Czech Republic. Described first from the Middle Miocene of Japan †Cyclocarya ezoana is also known from the Middle Miocene Seldovia Point Flora of Alaska. 10 Ma old fossil leaflets that are very similar to it have been found in Tröllatunga-Gautshamar Formation in Iceland. The Icelandic fossils and †C. ezoana are similar to †C. cyclocarpa from the Early Miocene of Germany.

== Gallery ==
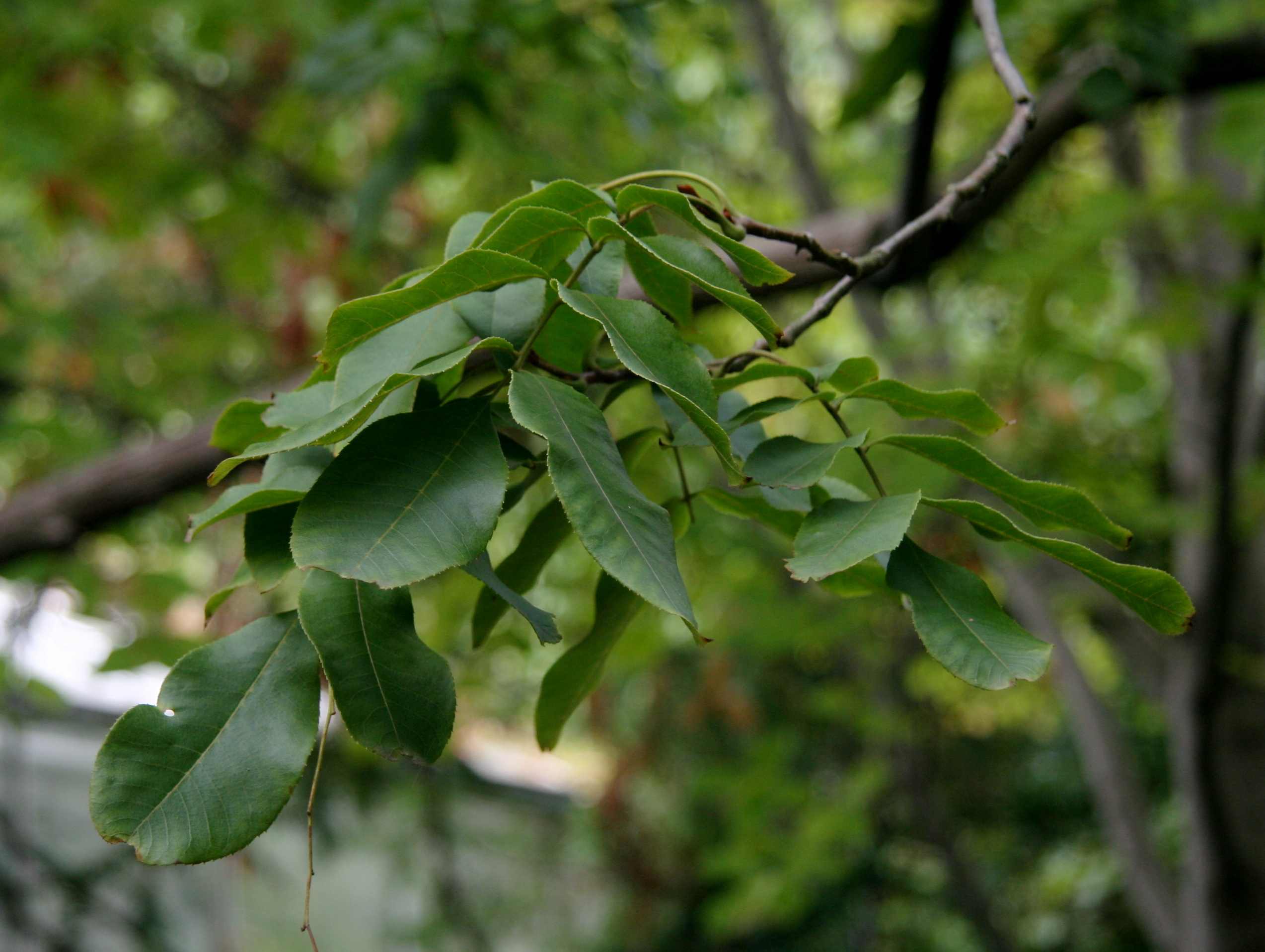
Cyclocarya paliurus in the Dresden Botanical Garden

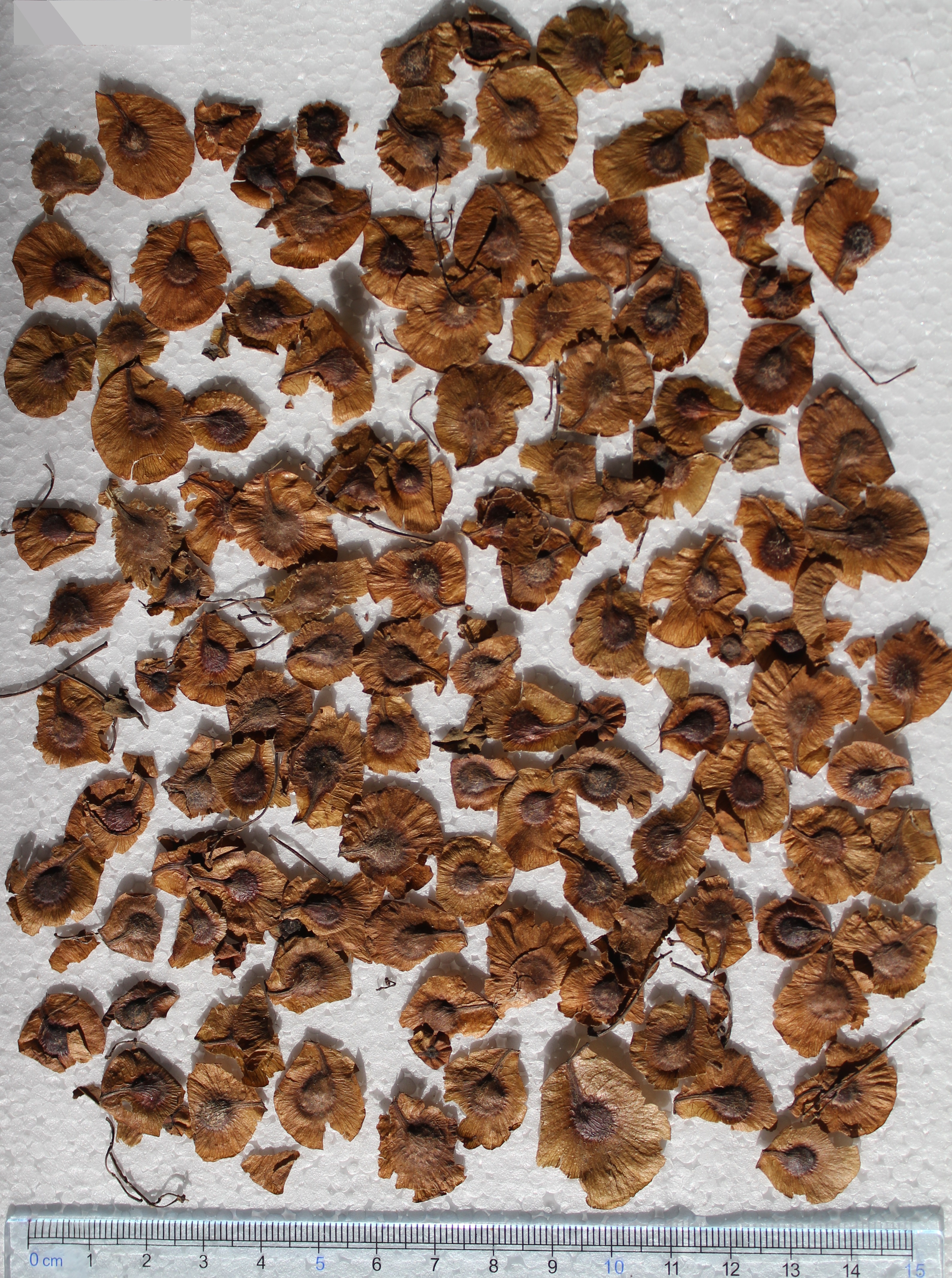
Winged nutlets
