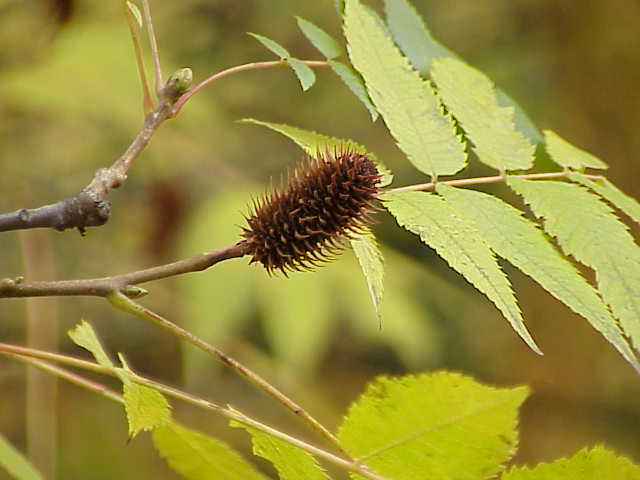
- Autumn foliage and fruit

Scientific classification
- Kingdom: Plantae
- Clade: Tracheophytes
- Clade: Angiosperms
- Clade: Eudicots
- Clade: Rosids
- Order: Fagales
- Family: Juglandaceae
- Genus: Platycarya
- Species: P. strobilacea

Binomial name
- Platycarya strobilacea Siebold & Zucc.

= Platycarya strobilacea =

Genus of flowering plants

Platycarya strobilacea is a species of flowering plant in the family Juglandaceae, formerly treated as comprising the single living species in Platycarya, though a second living species Platycarya longzhouensis is now recognized. It is native to eastern Asia in China, Vietnam, Korea, and Japan.

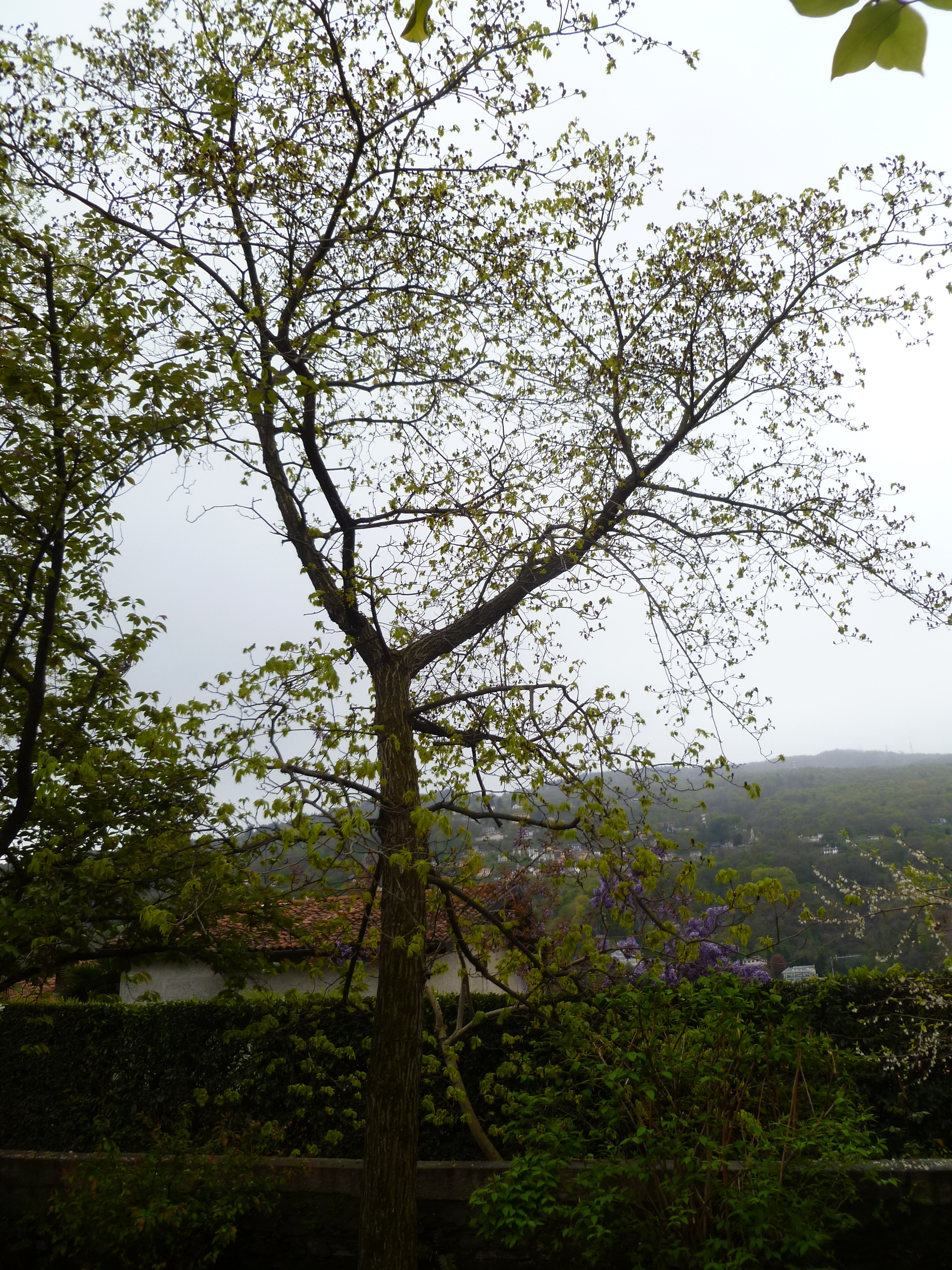
Platycarya strobilacea

It is a deciduous tree growing to 15 m tall. The leaves are usually pinnate, 15–30 cm long with 7–15 leaflets (rarely simple, or with up to 23 leaflets), the terminal leaflet present; the leaflets are 3–11 cm long and 1.5–3.5 cm broad. The flowers are catkins; the male (pollen) catkins are 2–15 cm long, the female catkins 2.5–5 cm long at maturity, hard and woody, superficially resembling a conifer cone with spirally arranged scales. Galloyl pedunculagin can be found in P. strobilacea.
