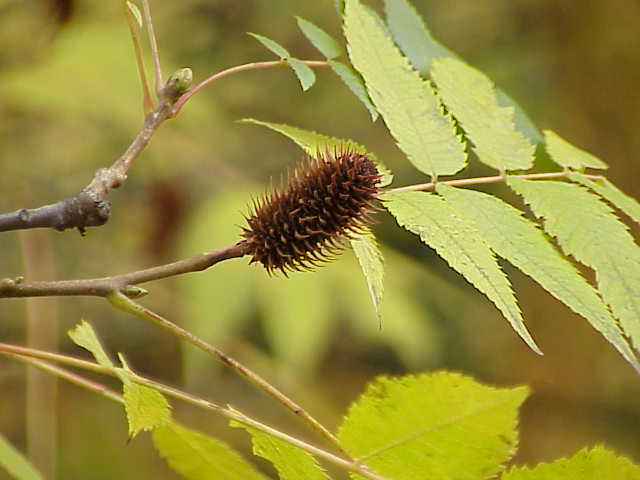
- Autumn foliage and fruit

Scientific classification
- Kingdom: Plantae
- Clade: Tracheophytes
- Clade: Angiosperms
- Clade: Eudicots
- Clade: Rosids
- Order: Fagales
- Family: Juglandaceae
- Subfamily: Juglandoideae
- Tribe: Platycaryeae
- Genus: Platycarya; Siebold & Zucc.

Species
- See text

Synonyms
- Fortunaea Lindl.; Petrophiloides E.Reid & M.Chandler

= Platycarya =

Platycarya Temporal range: Early Eocene–Recent

Genus of flowering plants

Platycarya is a genus of flowering plants in the family Juglandaceae native to eastern Asia in China, Korea, and Japan.

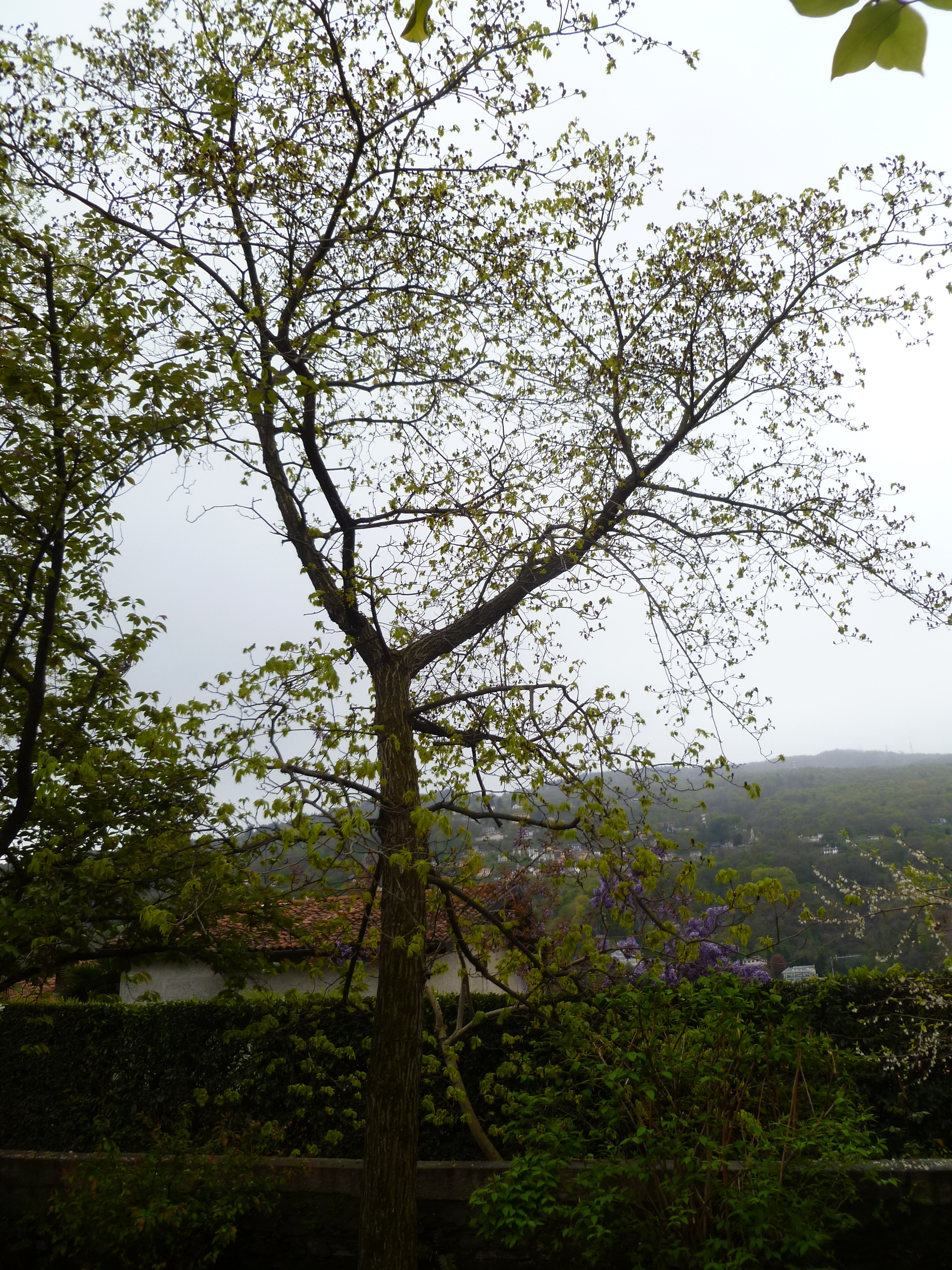
Platycarya strobilacea

The genus was formerly treated as comprising a single species Platycarya strobilacea, though the second living species Platycarya longzhouensis is now recognized.

A number of fossil species have been discovered across the Northern Hemisphere dating from the Early Eocene, although they became confined to eastern Asia during the Pleistocene ice ages.

- †Platycarya americana Hickey
- †Platycarya bognorensis (Chandler) Wing & Hickey
- †Platycarya castaneopsis (Lesquereux) Wing & Hickey
- †Platycarya manchesterii Wing & Hickey
- †Platycarya miocenica Hu & Chaney
- †Platycarya pseudobrauni (Hollick) Wolfe
- †Platycarya richardsoni (sic P. richardsonii) (Bowerbank) Chandler
