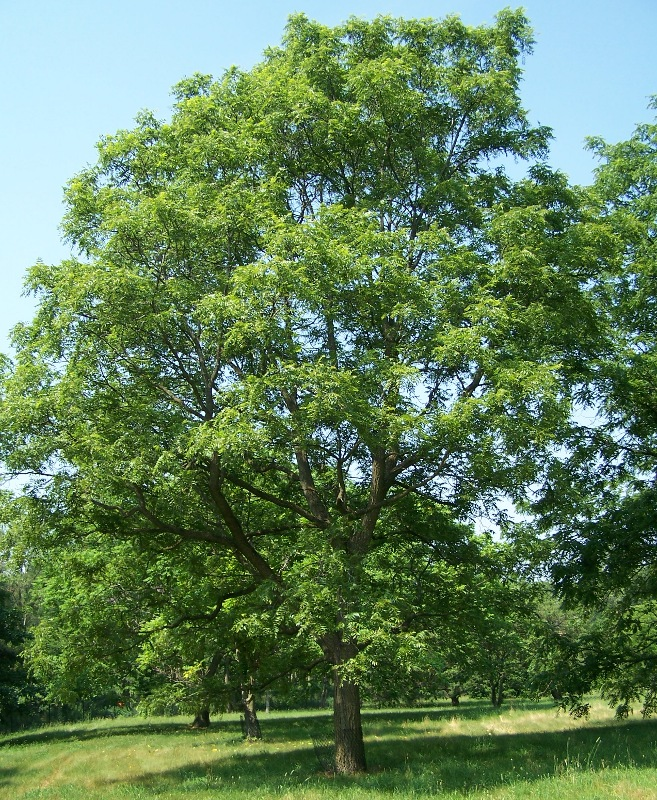
- At Morton Arboretum, Illinois

Conservation status
- Least Concern (IUCN 3.1)

Scientific classification
- Kingdom: Plantae
- Clade: Embryophytes
- Clade: Tracheophytes
- Clade: Angiosperms
- Clade: Eudicots
- Clade: Rosids
- Order: Fagales
- Family: Juglandaceae
- Genus: Juglans
- Section: Juglans sect. Rhysocaryon
- Species: J. major

Binomial name
- Juglans major (Torr.) A.Heller

Subdivision
- Juglans major var. glabrata W.E.Manning; Juglans major var. major; Juglans major f. stellata W.E.Manning
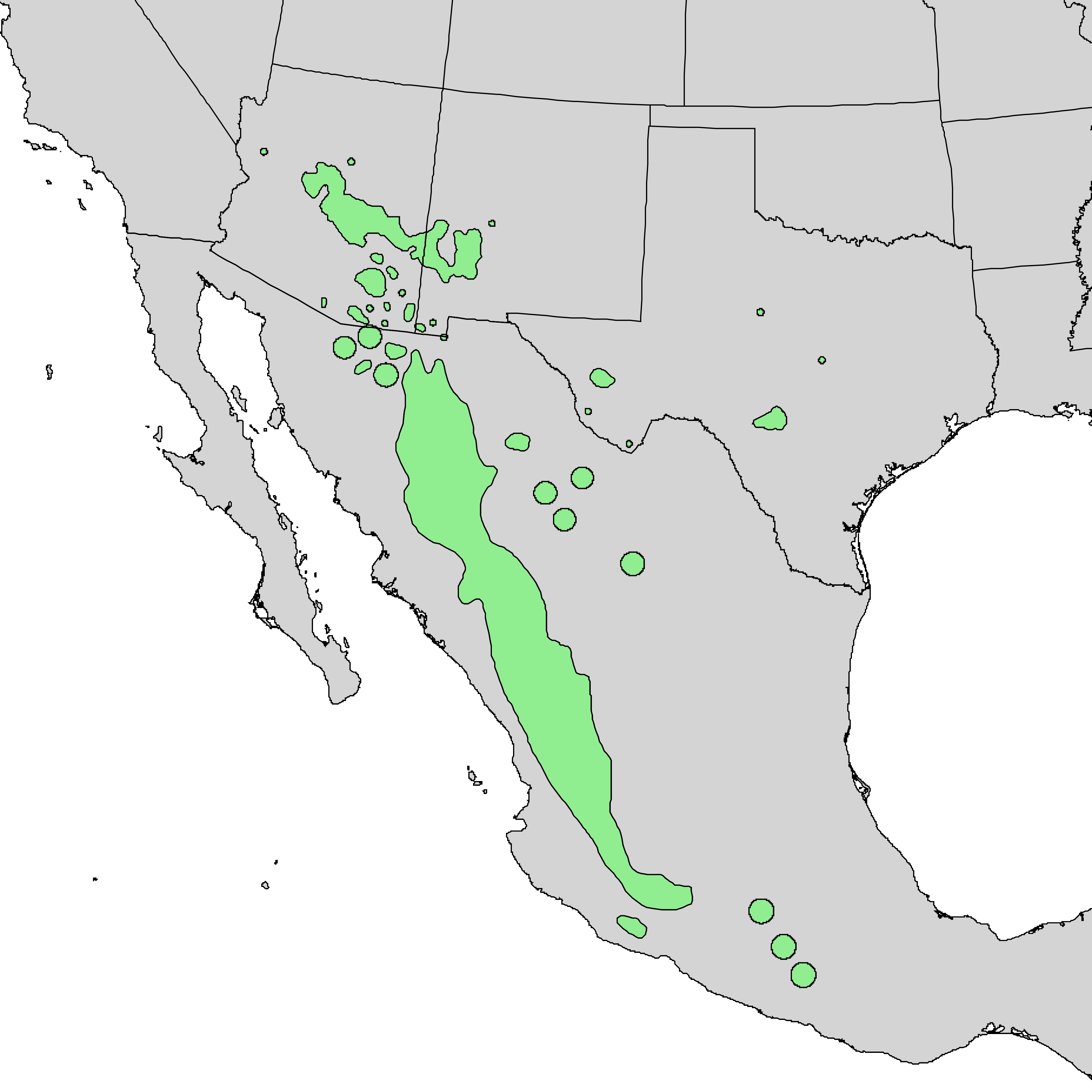
- Natural range of Juglans major

Synonyms
- Juglans elaeopyren Dode; Juglans microcarpa subsp. major (Torr.) A.E. Murray; Juglans microcarpa var. major (Torr.) L.D. Benson; Juglans rupestris var. major Torr

= Juglans major =

Species of tree

Juglans major (literally, the larger walnut), also known as Arizona walnut, is a walnut tree which grows to 50 ft tall (15 m) with a DBH of up to 0.61 metres (2 ft) at elevations of 300–2,130 m (1,000–7,000 ft) in Texas, Oklahoma, New Mexico, Arizona, and Utah. It also occurs in Mexico as far south as Guerrero. Common names include Arizona black walnut (as it belongs to the "black walnuts" section Juglans sect. Rhysocaryon), and the Spanish name nogal cimarrón (cimarron walnut).

== Description ==
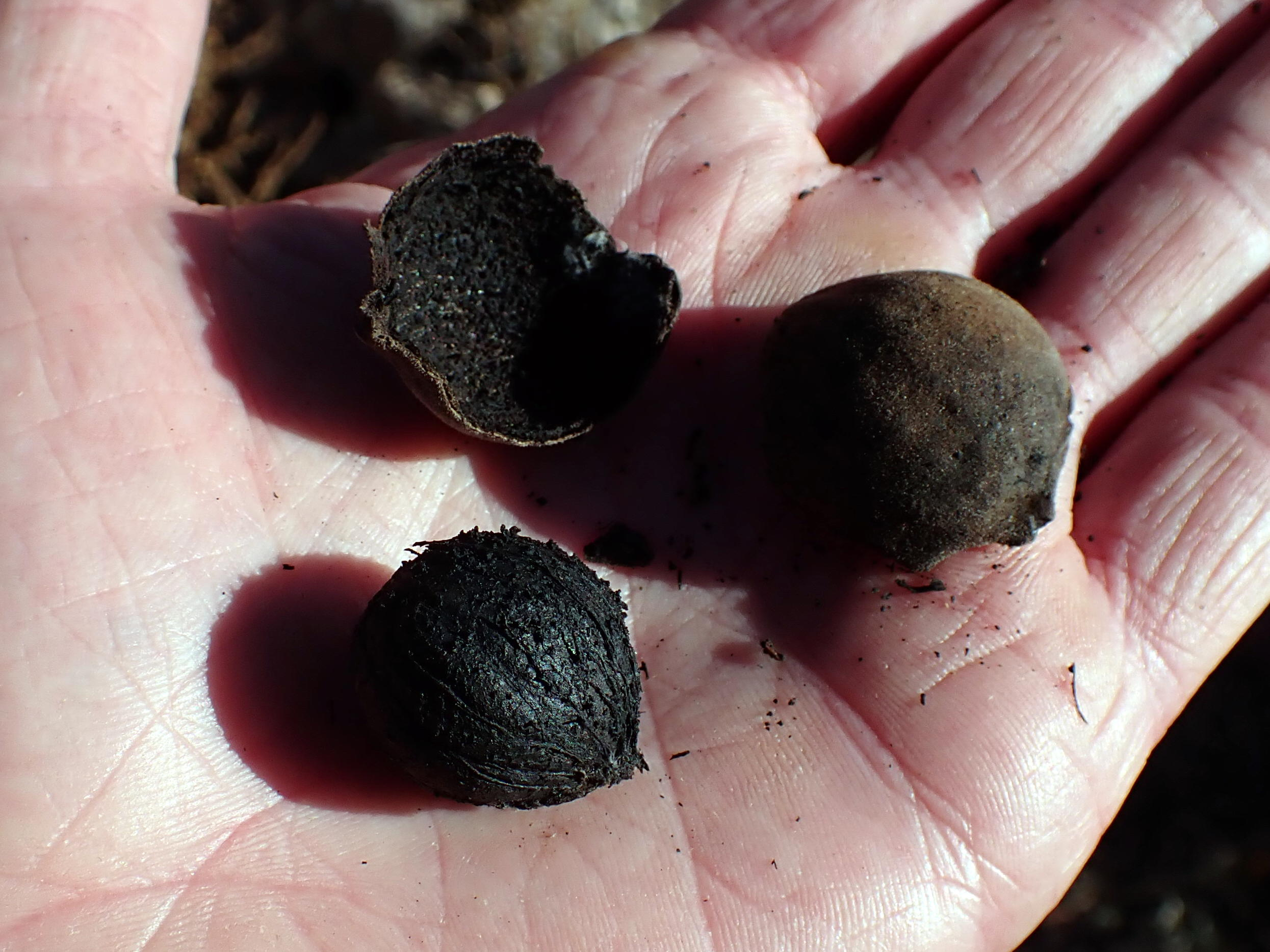
Juglans major nut and hulls

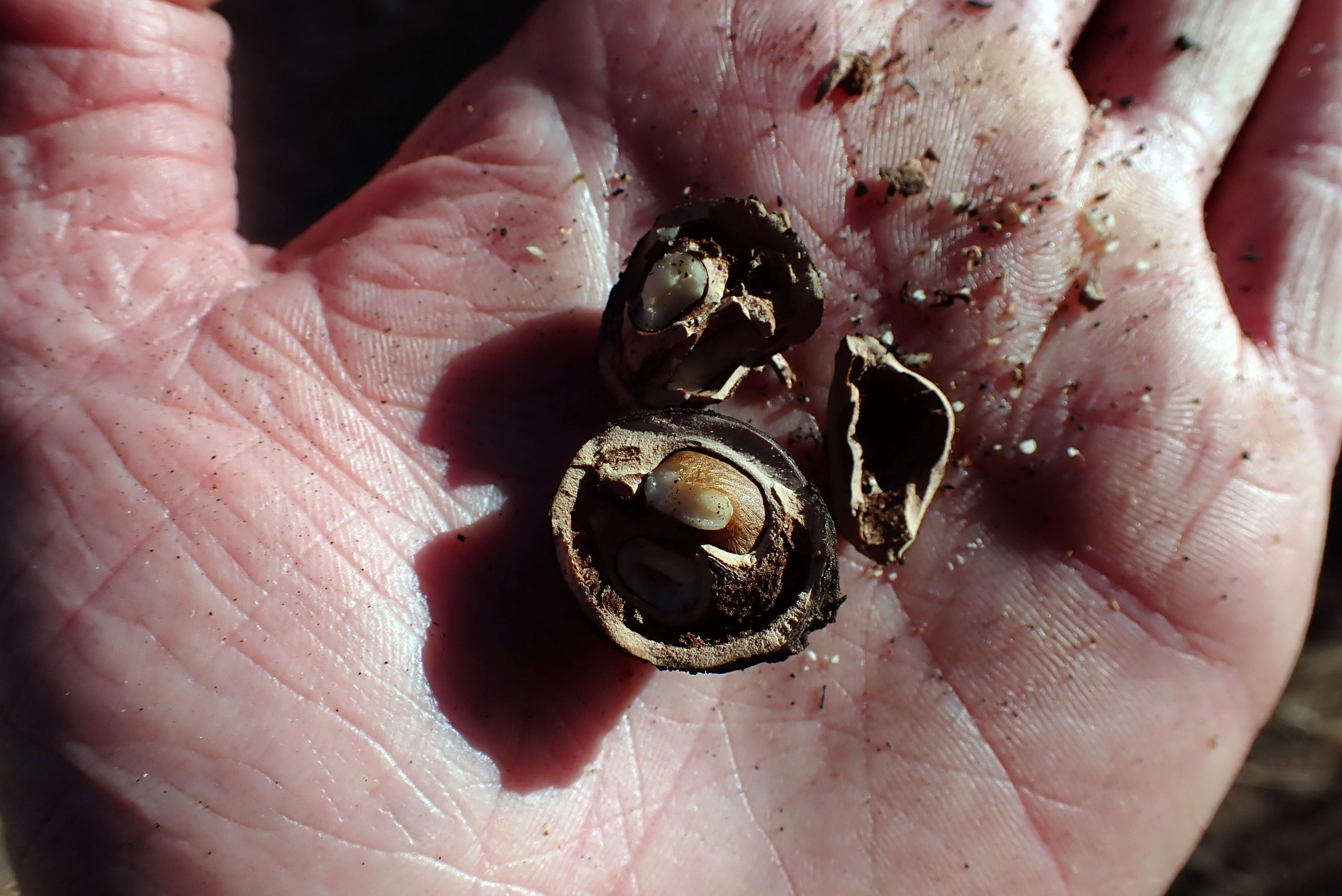
Juglans major nut cracked open showing nutmeat

In moister areas, the tree features a single, stout trunk; there are usually several slender trunks in drier situations. The 8–14 in (20–36 cm) long pinnately compound leaves bear 9–15 lanceolate leaflets, 19–32 mm (0.75–1.25 in) wide by 51–102 mm (2–4 in) long. The small nut has a thick shell with deep grooves enclosing an oily, edible seed.

J. major grows primarily in canyons or riparian areas, near springs, and other areas with shallow groundwater. Where the range of J. major overlaps that of J. microcarpa, the two interbreed, producing many intermediate forms.
