= Antarctoxylon =

Antarctoxylon Temporal range: Late Cretaceous, Coniacian

Scientific classification
- Kingdom: Plantae
- (unranked): Angiosperms
- Genus: Antarctoxylon Poole & Cantrill, 2001

Species
- A. livingstonensis Poole & Cantrill, 2001; A. multiseriatum Poole & Cantrill, 2001; A. heteroporosum Poole & Cantrill, 2001; A. uniperforatum Poole & Cantrill, 2001; A. mixai Sakala & Vodrážka, 2014

Genus of plants

Antarctoxylon is an extinct morphogenus of angiosperms that is found in the Coniacian of Antarctica. The most recently named species, A. mixai, is found in the Hidden Lake Formation on James Ross Island. All the other species, named by Poole and Cantrill, are found on Williams Point, Livingston Island.
