= Rhoiptelea =

- Rhoiptelea chiliantha

Conservation status
- Vulnerable (IUCN 2.3)

Scientific classification
- Kingdom: Plantae
- Clade: Tracheophytes
- Clade: Angiosperms
- Clade: Eudicots
- Clade: Rosids
- Order: Fagales
- Family: Juglandaceae
- Subfamily: Rhoipteleoideae; Reveal
- Genus: Rhoiptelea; Diels & Hand.-Mazz.
- Species: R. chiliantha

Binomial name
- Rhoiptelea chiliantha Diels & Hand.-Mazz.

Synonyms
- Rhoipteleaceae Handel-Mazzetti

Genus of trees

Rhoiptelea is a monotypic genus of flowering plants in the family Juglandaceae, containing the single species Rhoiptelea chiliantha, commonly known as the horsetail tree. It is native to southwestern China (Guangxi, Guizhou, Yunnan) and the far north of Vietnam, and grows at altitudes of 700-2,500 metres in mountainous areas.

== Taxonomy ==
This genus was previously treated in its own family Rhoipteleaceae, but the 2009 APG III system transferred it to the family Juglandaceae.

== Description ==
Rhoiptelea chiliantha is a tree growing to 20 metres tall, with a trunk up to 60 cm diameter. The leaves are pinnately compound, 15-40 cm long, with (7–) 9–11 (–13) leaflets with a papery texture. The flowers are wind-pollinated, arranged in large pendulous panicles usually 15-30 cm long (rarely to 38 cm long); the fruit is a small 2–3 mm nut with rounded wings. It is a protected species of China.
