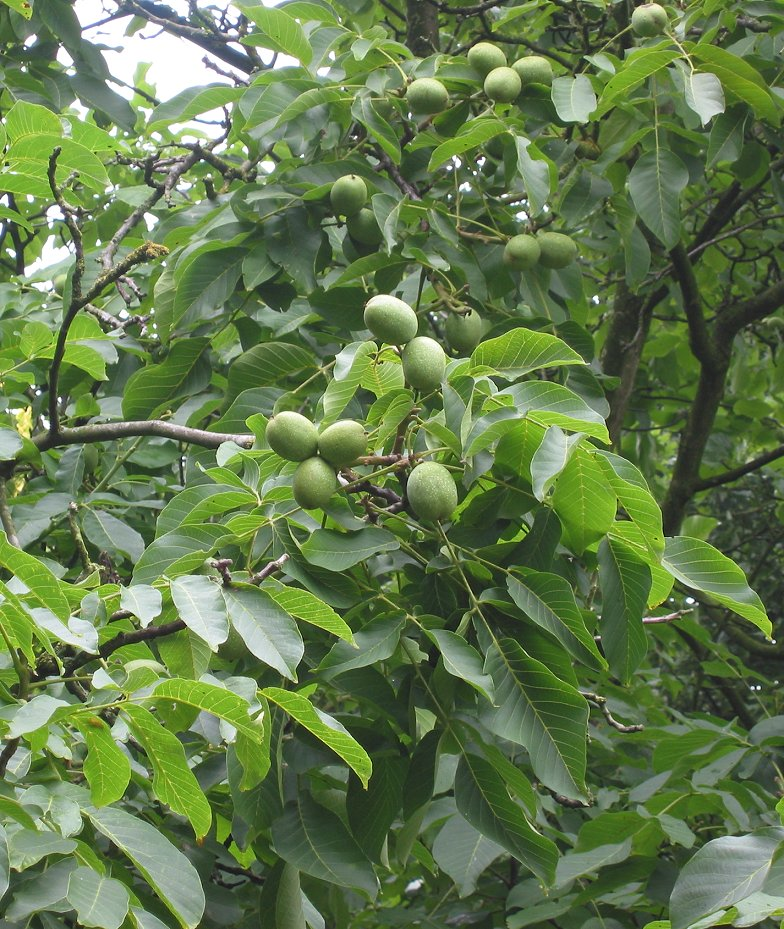
- Juglans regia

Scientific classification
- Kingdom: Plantae
- Clade: Tracheophytes
- Clade: Angiosperms
- Clade: Eudicots
- Clade: Rosids
- Order: Fagales
- Family: Juglandaceae; Augustin Pyramus Perleb fermium

Type genus
- Juglans L.

Subfamilies
- Engelhardioideae; Juglandoideae; Rhoipteleoideae
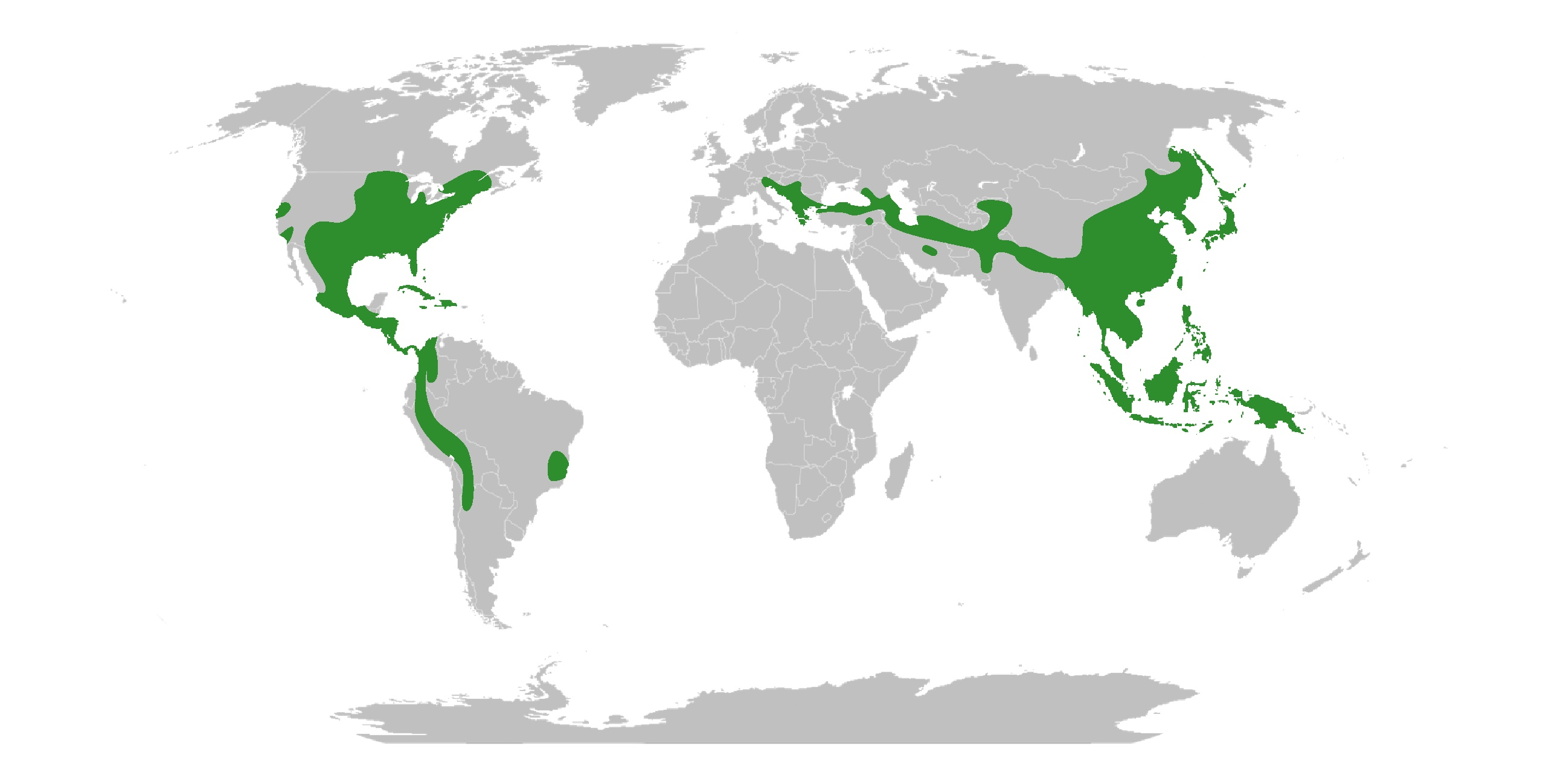

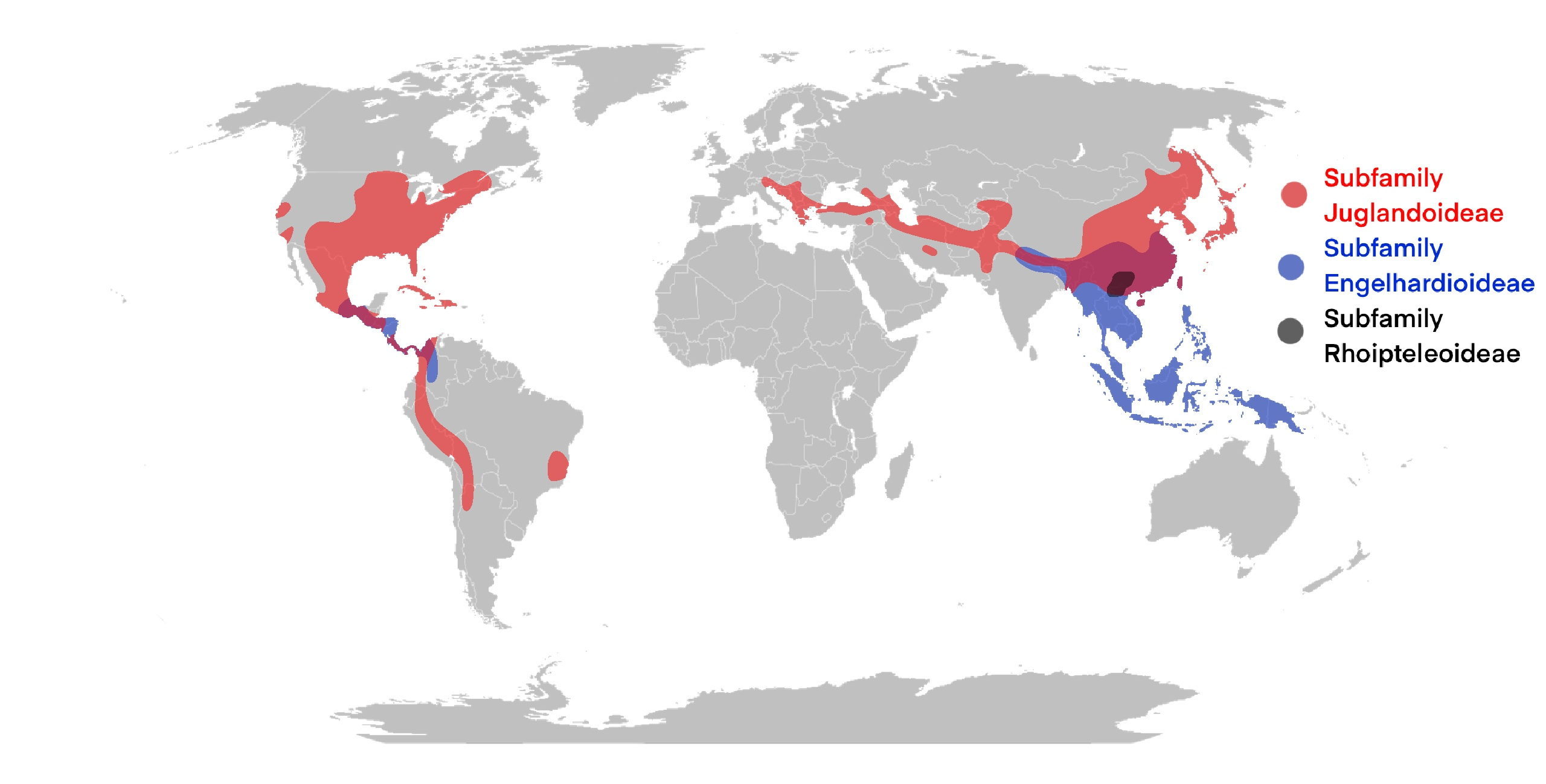

Synonyms
- Platycaryaceae Nakai ex Doweld; Pterocaryaceae Nakai, nom. inval.; Rhoipteleaceae Hand.-Mazz. 1932, nom. cons.

= Juglandaceae =

Walnut family of trees

The Juglandaceae are an angiosperm family known as the walnuts. They are trees, or sometimes shrubs, in the order Fagales. Members of this family are native to the Americas, Eurasia, and Southeast Asia.

The nine or ten genera in the family have a total of around 63 species, and include the commercially important nut-producing trees walnut (Juglans), pecan (Carya illinoinensis), and hickory (Carya). The Persian walnut, Juglans regia, is one of the major nut crops of the world. Walnut, hickory, and gaulin are also valuable timber trees while pecan wood is also valued as cooking fuel.

The genetic relationships between different members of the family have recently been studied in more detail.

== Description ==
Members of the walnut family are trees (rarely large shrubs) with aromatic leaves that are usually alternate, but opposite in Alfaroa and Oreomunnea. The leaves are pinnately compound or ternate, and usually 20–100 cm long. The trees are wind-pollinated, and both the male and female the flowers are usually arranged in catkins.Members of this family are often monoecious, but can be dioecious.

The fruits of the Juglandaceae are often confused with drupes but are accessory fruit because the outer covering of the fruit is technically an involucre and thus not morphologically part of the carpel; this means it cannot be a drupe but is instead a drupe-like nut.

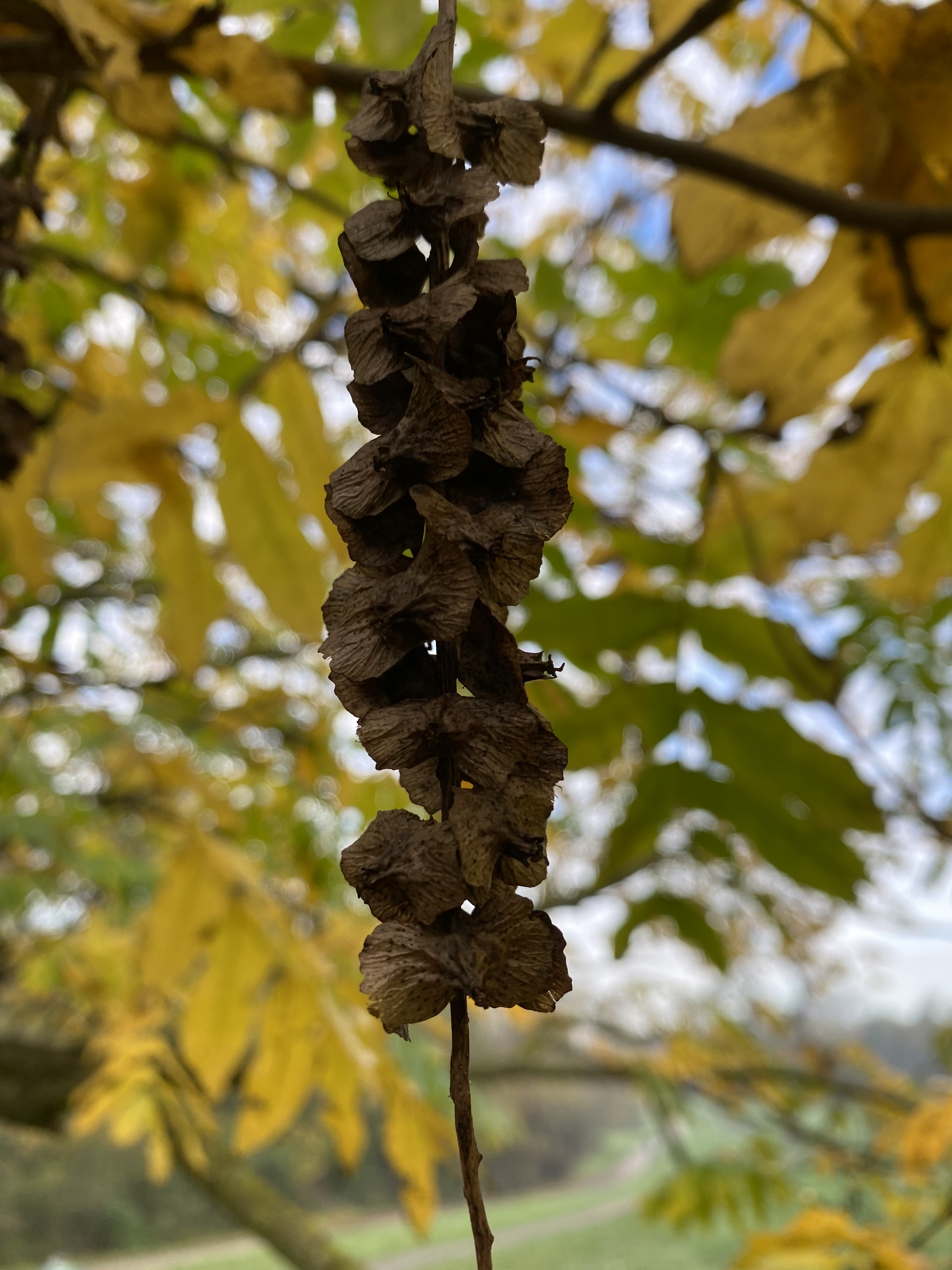
Catkin of Juglans cinera (White walnut or Butternut)

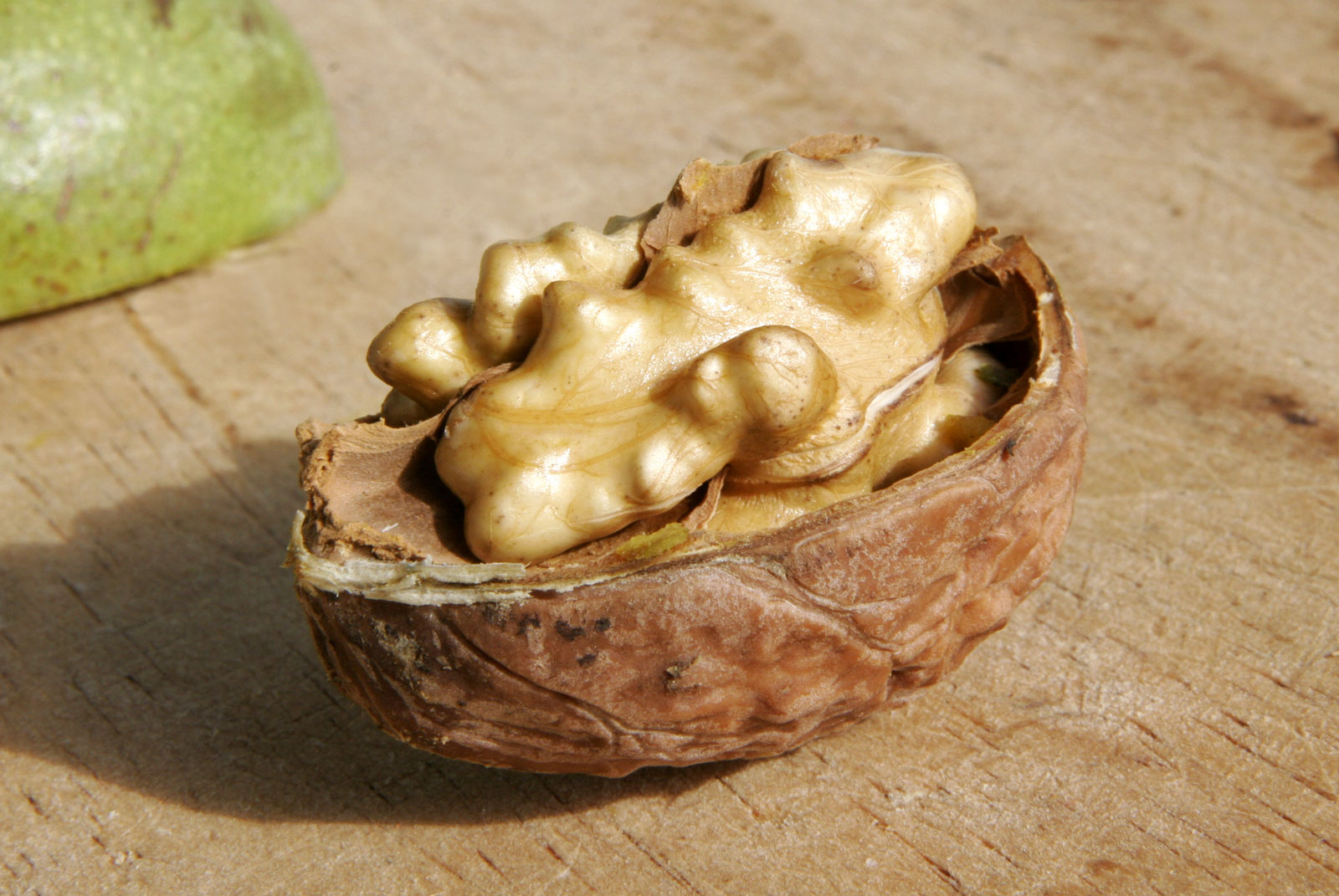
Nut of Juglans regia

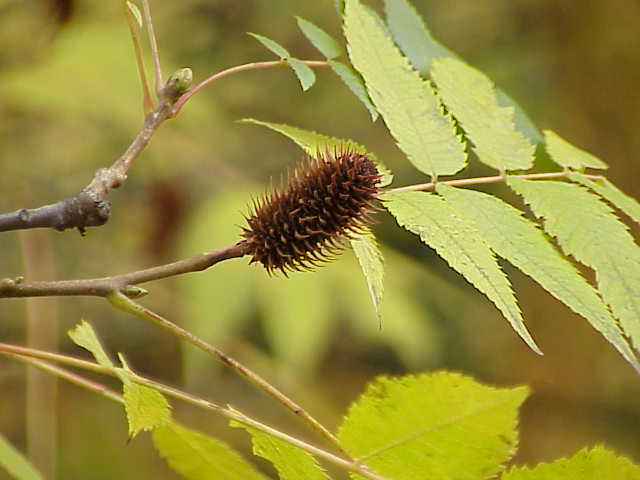
Foliage and seed catkin of Platycarya strobilacea

== Ecology ==
=== Climate change ===
Members of Juglandaceae have been projected to experience a range shift as the climate changes. Species distribution models show that within Europe Juglans regia will experience a northward shift to stay within a climatically suitable habitat. Different climate scenarios were modeled, revealing that the severity of range shift will increase with greater temperature changes. Expansion could extend beyond the native range, making this species invasive.

Some members of Juglandaceae have been documented to have formed associations with both ectomycorrhizal fungi and arbuscular mycorrhizal fungi. Dual mycorrhizal associations and their functional significance are still being studied, but they may confer ecological advantages. Within Juglandaceae, these relationships remain an ongoing area of research.

=== Biogeography ===
Juglandaceae distribution ranges from the temperate regions of North American, Europe, and Asia into the tropical regions of Asia and parts of Central and South America.The subfamily Juglandoideae is thought to have originated and rapidly diversified in the early Cenozoic in North America. The history of the distribution of this family was determined through phylogenetic studies and the fossil record. It then spread to Asia and Europe across the Bering and North Atlantic land bridges.

=== Seed dispersal ===
Seeds are dispersed by rodents (mostly squirrels) and members of the crow family. Squirrels will bury nuts for winter and forget where they put them, aiding in seed dispersal. Humans have also dispersed seeds for farming purposes.

=== Toxicity ===
Members of this family, particularly the Black walnut (Juglans nigara) produce juglone (5 hydroxy-1, 4-napthoquinone), a toxic chemical compound responsible for hindering the growth of surrounding plants. This is present in most parts of the plants that produce it. The kernel of the nut is edible.

== Taxonomy ==
The known living genera are grouped into subfamilies, tribes, and subtribes as follows:

- Subfamily Rhoipteleoideae Reveal
  - Rhoiptelea Diels & Hand.-Mazz. 1932
- Subfamily Engelhardioideae Iljinskaya 1990
  - Alfaroa Standl. 1927—gaulin
  - Engelhardia Lesch. ex Blume 1825–1826—cheo
  - Oreomunnea Oerst. 1856
- Subfamily Juglandoideae Eaton 1836
  - Tribe Platycaryeae Nakai 1933
    - Platycarya Siebold & Zucc. 1843
  - Tribe Juglandeae Rchb. 1832
    - Subtribe Caryinae D.E. Stone & P. S. Manos 2001
      - Carya Nutt. 1818—hickory and pecan
      - Annamocarya A.Chev. 1941 (sometimes included in Carya due to new molecular evidence)
    - Subtribe Juglandinae D.E. Stone & P. S. Manos 2001
      - Cyclocarya Iljinsk 1953—wheel wingnut
      - Juglans L. 1753—walnut
      - Pterocarya Kunth 1824—wingnut

== Systematics ==
Modern molecular phylogenetics suggest the following relationships:

- - Myricaceae (outgroup)
  - Juglandaceae
    - Rhoipteleoideae
      Rhoiptelea
    - - Engelhardioideae
        - Engelhardia
        - - Alfaroa
          - Oreomunnea
      - Juglandoideae
        - - Carya
          - Annamocarya
        - - Platycarya
          - - Cyclocarya
            - - Pterocarya
              - Juglans

=== Recent research ===
Recent molecular studies, by analyzing chloroplast and nuclear DNA sequences, have clarified the relationships in Juglandaceae. There is evidence that whole genome duplication happened in an ancestral species. Studies have shown there to be two new species within Engelhardia. These two species are Engelhardia anminiana H.H Meng 2018 and Engelhardia borneensis H.H Meng 2018.

== Human uses ==
=== Food ===
Members of this family, such as walnuts (Juglans) and pecans (Carya illinoinensis) are often farmed for their fruits which are eaten across the world. The United States of America produces the most pecans, followed by Mexico. China produces the majority of the worlds walnuts, followed by the United States of America. Sap from the hickory trees (Carya) was collected by Native-Americans to be used as a sweetener.

=== Timber ===
Walnut wood is generally known for its rich dark brown color, which makes it popular amongst woodworkers. It is often used for smaller wooden objects, such as cabinets and furniture. The wood of butternut (Juglans cinerea) is usually a lighter tan color.

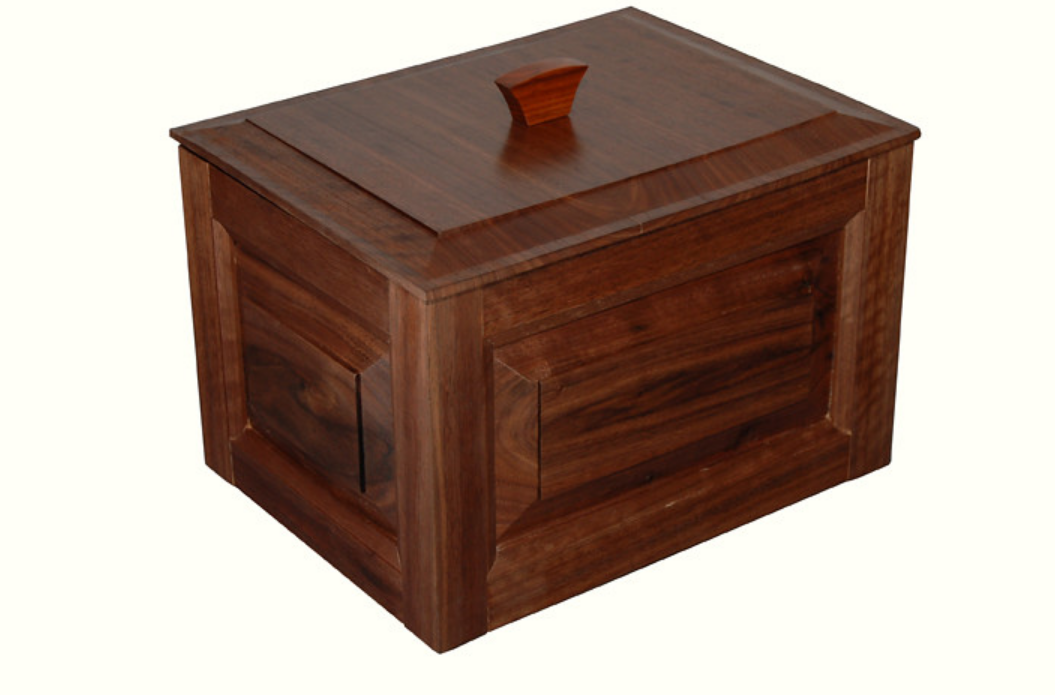
This is a jewelry box made out of black walnut wood

Hickory (Carya) wood is also popular. It is known for being flexible, making it often used to make various sporting equipment. Bows, ax handles, skis, and lacrosse sticks are commonly made out of hickory wood. Its shock resistant qualities made it popular amongst the American pioneers for building their cabins.
