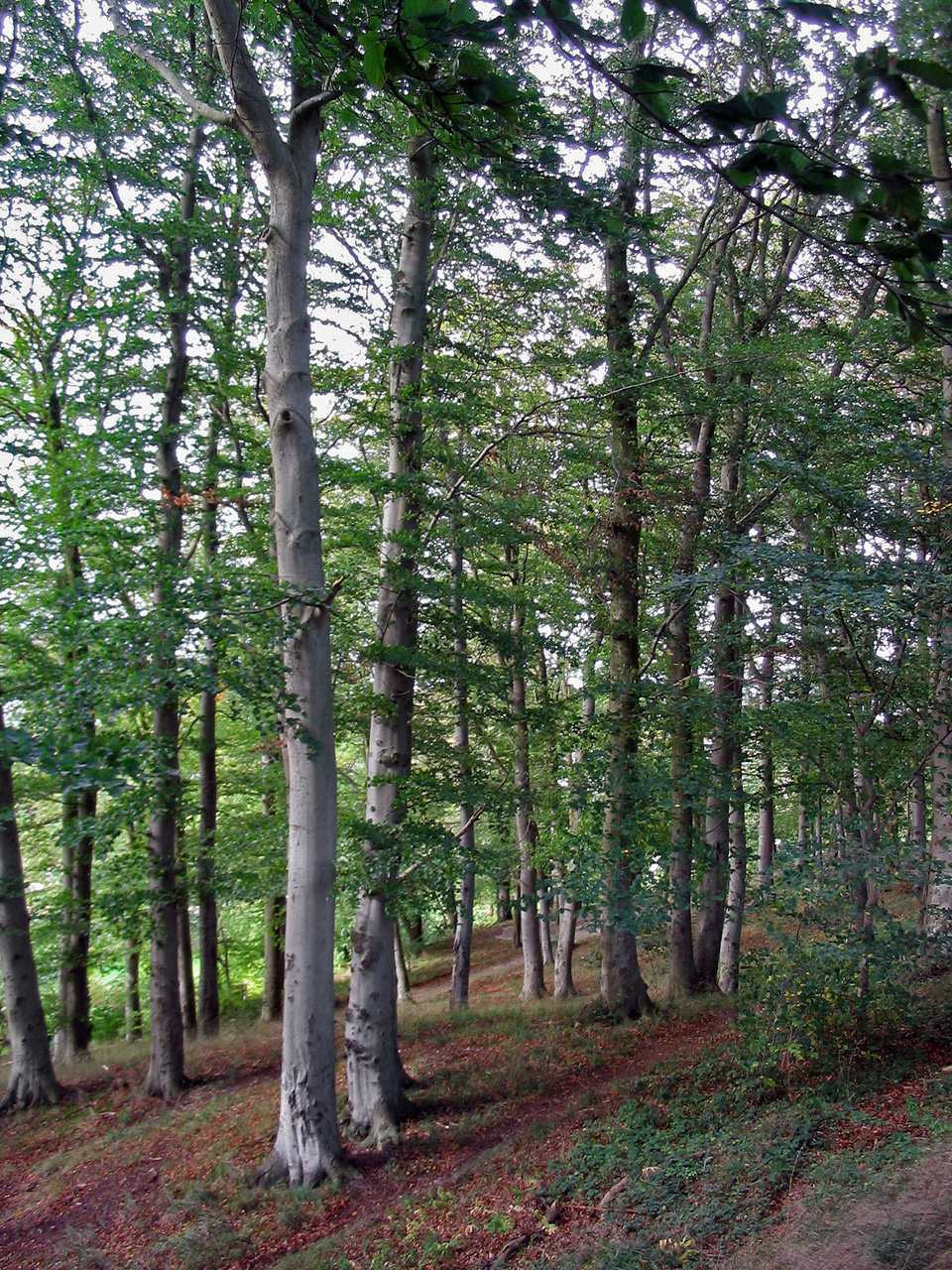
- Fagus sylvatica

Scientific classification
- Kingdom: Plantae
- Clade: Tracheophytes
- Clade: Angiosperms
- Clade: Eudicots
- Clade: Rosids
- Clade: Fabids
- Order: Fagales; Engl.

Families
- Betulaceae; Casuarinaceae; Fagaceae; Juglandaceae; Myricaceae; Nothofagaceae; Ticodendraceae
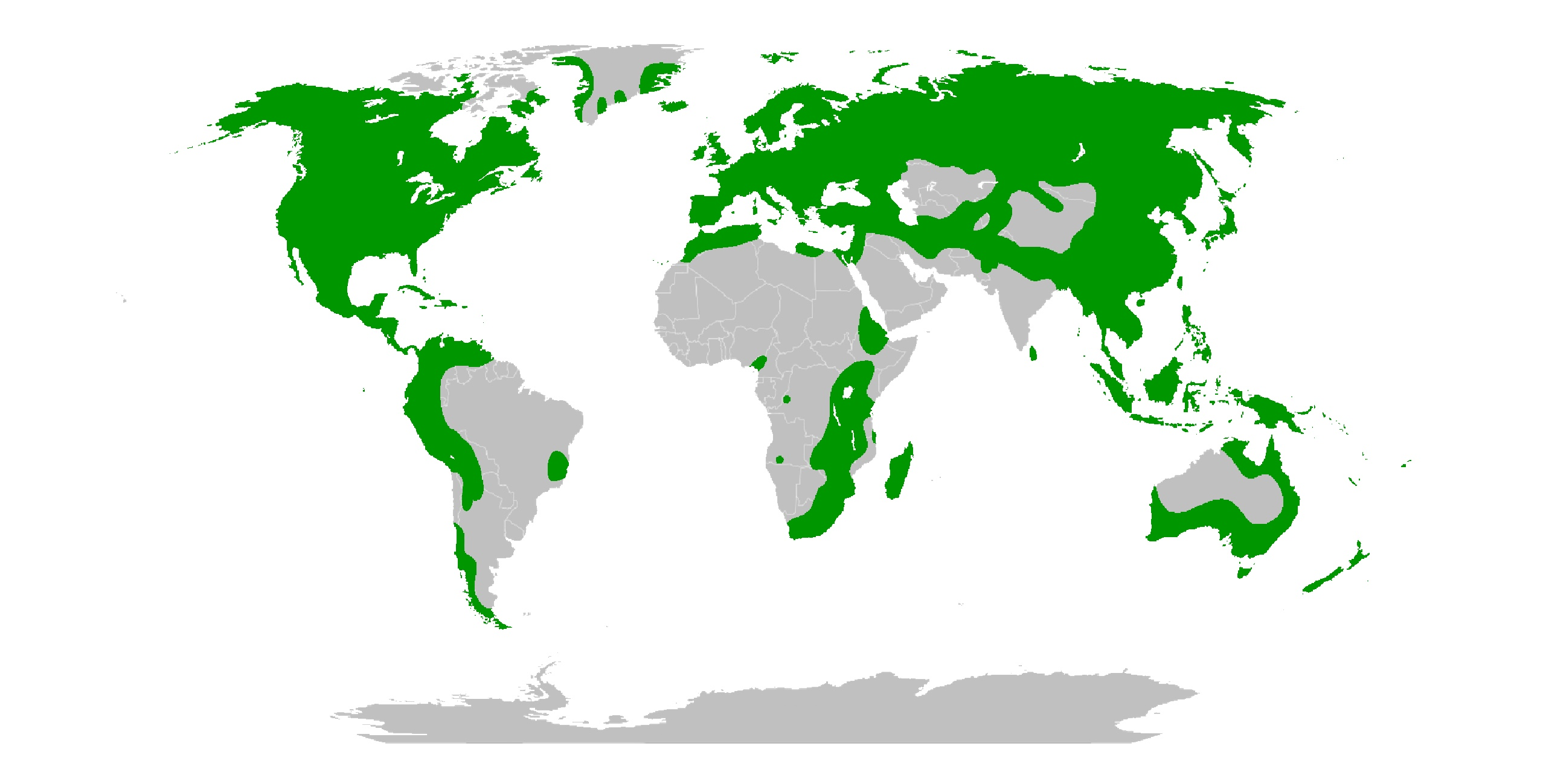

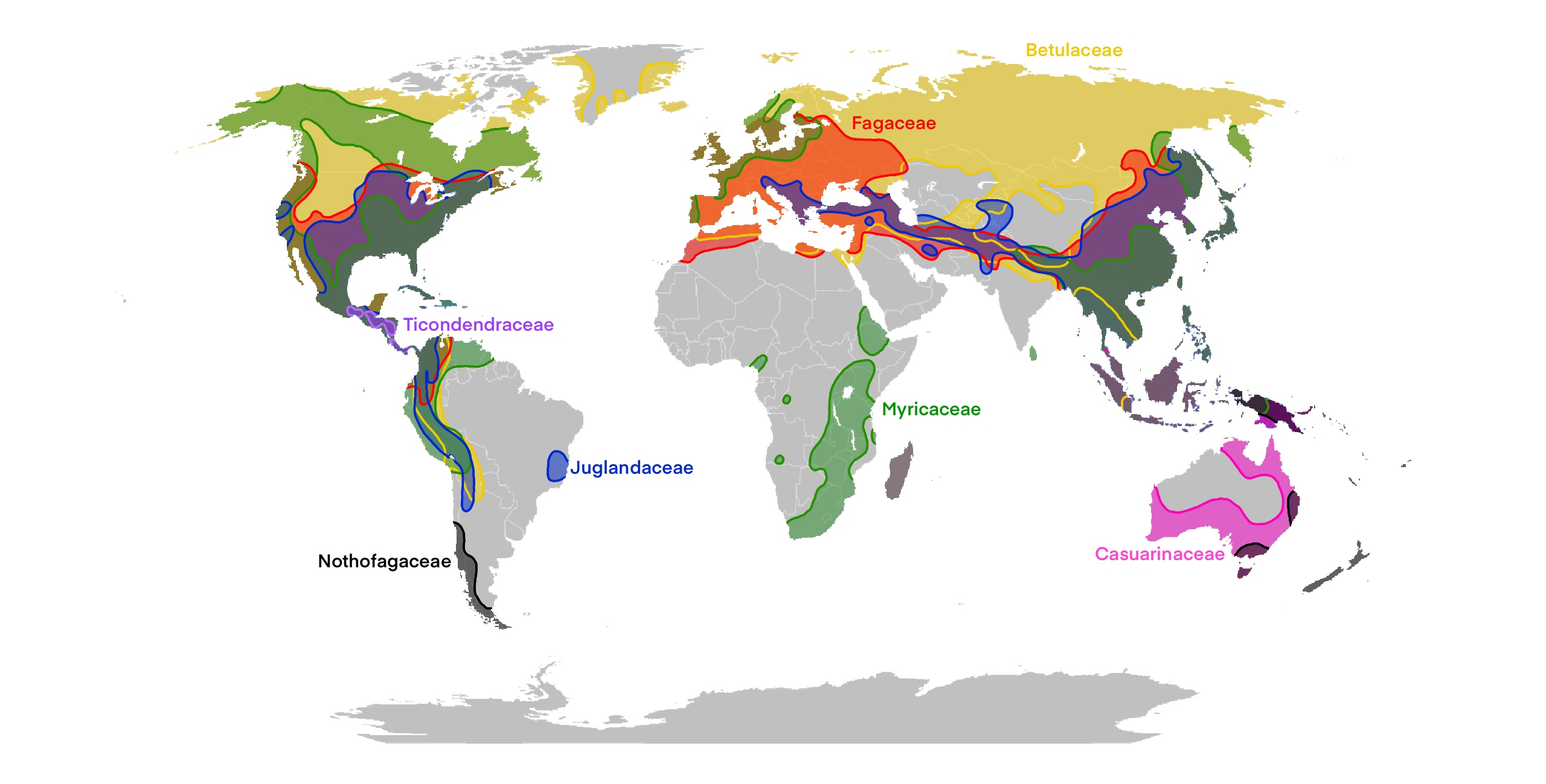

Synonyms
- Betulales Martius; Carpinales Döll; Casuarinales Berchtold & J. Presl; Casuarinanae Reveal & Doweld; Corylales Dumortier; Faganae Takhtajan; Juglandales Berchtold & J. Presl; Juglandanae Reveal; Juglandineae Thorne & Reveal; Myricales Martius; Myricineae Thorne & Reveal; Nothofagales Doweld; Quercales Burnett; Rhoipteleales Reveal

= Fagales =

Fagales Temporal range: Late Cretaceous–Recent

Order of flowering plants

The Fagales are an order of flowering plants in the rosid group of dicotyledons, including some of the best-known trees. Well-known members of Fagales include: beeches, chestnuts, oaks, walnut, pecan, hickory, birches, alders, hazels, hornbeams, she-oaks, and southern beeches. The order name is derived from genus Fagus (beeches).

== Systematics ==
Fagales include the following seven families, according to the APG III system of classification:

- Betulaceae – birch family (Alnus, Betula, Carpinus, Corylus, Ostrya, and Ostryopsis)
- Casuarinaceae – she-oak family (Allocasuarina, Casuarina, Ceuthostoma, and Gymnostoma)
- Fagaceae – beech family (Castanea, Castanopsis, Chrysolepis, Fagus, Lithocarpus, Notholithocarpus, Quercus, and Trigonobalanus)
- Juglandaceae – walnut family (Alfaroa, Carya, Cyclocarya, Engelhardia, Juglans, Oreomunnea, Platycarya, Pterocarya, and Rhoiptelea)
- Myricaceae – bayberry family (Canacomyrica, Comptonia, and Myrica)
- Nothofagaceae – southern beech family (Nothofagus)
- Ticodendraceae – ticodendron family (Ticodendron)

Modern molecular phylogenetics suggest the following relationships:

- - Cucurbitales (outgroup)
  - Fagales
    - Nothofagaceae
    - - Fagaceae
      - - - Myricaceae
          - Juglandaceae
        - - - Ticodendraceae
            - Betulaceae
          - Casuarinaceae

The older Cronquist system only included four families (Betulaceae, Corylaceae, Fagaceae, Ticodendraceae; Corylaceae now being included within Betulaceae); this arrangement is followed by, for example, the World Checklist of selected plant families. The other families were split into three different orders, placed among the Hamamelidae. The Casuarinales comprised the single family Casuarinaceae, the Juglandales comprised the Juglandaceae and Rhoipteleaceae, and the Myricales comprised the remaining forms (plus Balanops). The change is due to studies suggesting the Myricales, so defined, are paraphyletic to the other two groups.

== Characteristics ==
Most Fagales are wind pollinated and are monoecious with unisexual flowers.

== Evolutionary history ==
The oldest member of the order is the flower Soepadmoa cupulata preserved in the late Turonian-Coniacian New Jersey amber, which is a mosaic with characteristics characteristic of both Nothofagus and other Fagales, suggesting that the ancestor of all Fagales was Nothofagus-like.
