= Holdridge life zones in Guatemala =

There are 14 Holdridge life zones in Guatemala:

Life zones	km²	%	Indicator vegetation species
Subtropical thorn scrub	928	0.85	Cactus spp., Pereskia spp., Jacquinia aurantiaca, Guaiacum sanctum, Bucida macrostachya, Vachellia farnesiana, Cordia dentata.
Tropical dry forest	216	0.20	Omphalea oleifera, Talisia olivaeformis, Chloroleucon mangense, Jacaratia mexicana, Myrospermum frutescens.
Subtropical dry forest	3,964	3.64	Cochlospermum vitifolium, Swietenia humilis, Alvaradoa amorphoides, Sabal mexicana, Phyllocarpus septentrionalis, Ceiba aesculifolia, Albizia caribaea, Rhizophora mangle, Avicennia nitida, Leucaena guatemalensis.
Subtropical moist forest (temperate)	12,320	11.32	Pinus oocarpa, Curatella americana, Quercus spp., Byrsonima crassifolia.
Subtropical moist forest (warm)	27,000	24.81	Southern zone: Sterculia apetala, Platymiscium dimorphandrum, Maclura tinctoria, Cordia alliodora.; Northern zone: Byrsonima crassifolia, Curatella americana, Xylopia frutescens, Metopium brownei, Quercus oleoides, Sabal morisiana, Manilkara zapota, Pseudobombax ellipticum, Pimenta dioica, Aspidosperma megalocarpon, Alseis yucatensis
Subtropical wet forest (warm)	40,700	37.41	Southern zone: Scheelea preussii, Terminalia oblonga, Enterolobium cyclocarpum, Sickingia salvadorensis, Triplaris melaenodendrum, Cybistax donnell-smithii, Andira inermis.; Northern zone: Attalea cohune, Terminalia amazonia, Brosimum alicastrum, Lonchocarpus spp., Virola spp., Cecropia pentandra, Vochysia guatemalensis, Pinus caribaea.
Subtropical wet forest (temperate)	2,584	2.38	Liquidambar styraciflua, Persea donnell-smithii, Eurya seemanii, Pinus pseudostrobus, Persea schediana, Rapanea ferruginea, Clethra spp., Myrica spp., Croton draco.
Subtropical rain forest	1,144	1.05	Magnolia guatemalensis, Talauma spp., Alfaroa spp.
Tropical rain forest	2,636	2.42	Acacia cookii, Cordia gerascanthus, Zanthoxylum belicense, Crudia spp., Podocarpus spp., Basiloxylon excelsa.
Subtropical lower montane moist forest	9,769	8.98	Quercus spp., Pinus pseudostrobus, Pinus montezumae, Juniperus comitana, Alnus jorullensis, Ostrya spp., Carpinus spp., Prunus serotina capuli, Arbutus xalapensis.
Subtropical lower montane wet forest	5,512	5.07	Cupressus lusitanica, Pinus ayacahuite, Chiranthodendron pentadactylon, Pinus hartwegii, Pinus pseudostrobus, Alnus jorullensis, Quercus spp., Zinowiewia spp., Buddleja spp.
Subtropical lower montane rain forest	908	0.83	Podocarpus oleifolius, Alfaroa costaricensis, Engelhardia spp., Billia hippocastanum, Magnolia guatemalensis, Brunellia spp., Oreopanax xalapensis, Hedyosmum mexicanum, Gunnera spp.
Subtropical montane moist forest	88	0.08	Juniperus standleyi, Pinus hartwegii.
Subtropical montane wet forest	1,040	0.96	Abies guatemalensis, Pinus ayacahuite, Pinus hartwegii, Pinus pseudostrobus, Cupressus lusitanica, Quercus spp., Bocona volcanica, Buddleja spp., Cestrum spp., Garya spp., Bacharia spp.
Total area	108,809	100%	
