= Sierra de las Minas =

- Location within Guatemala

Highest point
- Peak: Cerro Raxón, Alta Verapaz
- Elevation: 3,015 m (9,892 ft)
- Coordinates: 15°09′47″N 89°51′05″W

Geography
- Country: Guatemala
- Region(s): Alta Verapaz, Baja Verapaz, El Progreso Department, Zacapa, Izabal
- Range coordinates: 15°10′00″N 89°40′00″W

Sierra de las Minas is a mountain range in eastern Guatemala which extends 130 km west of the Lake Izabal. It is 15–30 km wide and bordered by the valleys of the Polochic River in the north and the Motagua River in the south. Its western border is marked by the Salamá River valley which separates it from the Chuacús mountain range. The highest peak is Cerro Raxón at 3,015 m. The Sierras (Chuacús) rich deposits of jade and marble have been mined for centuries. The small scale mining activities explain the name of the mountain range.

The range has several different habitats, including Mesoamerica's largest cloud forests and is home to a great variety of wildlife. A large part of the Sierra de las Minas was declared a biosphere reserve in 1990.

== Biosphere reserve ==
Sierra de las Minas biosphere reserve
- IUCN category VI (protected area with sustainable use of natural resources)
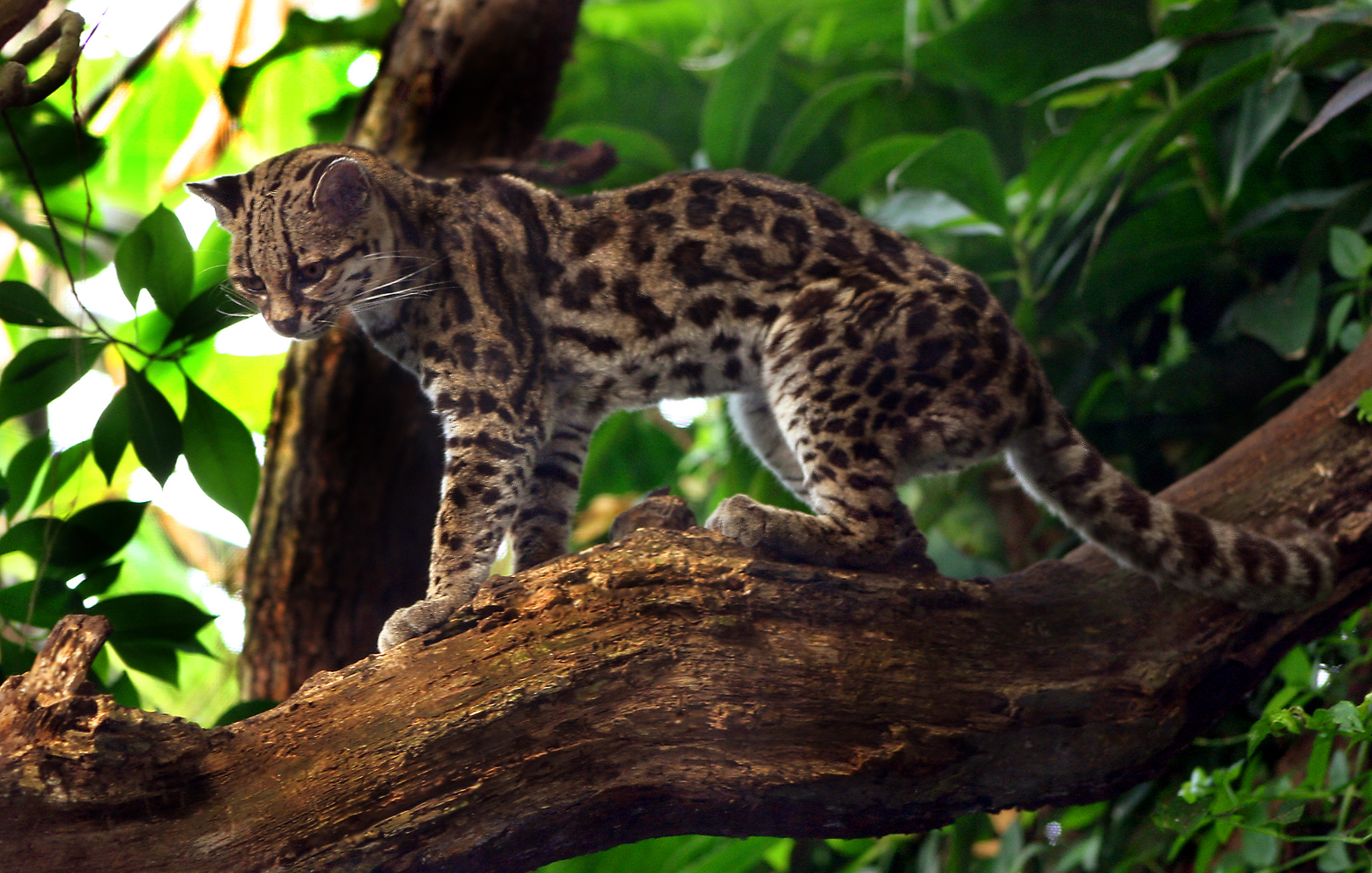
- The reserve has a significant margay population
- Interactive map of Sierra de las Minas biosphere reserve
- Location: Alta Verapaz, Baja Verapaz, El Progreso Department, Zacapa, Izabal, Guatemala
- Area: 2,408 km^{2} (930 sq mi)
- Operator: CONAP, Defensores de la Naturaleza
- Website: Defensores de la Naturaleza

In 1990, a substantial part of the Sierra de las Minas (2,408.03 km^{2} or 929.75 sq mi, including the buffer zones and transition areas) was designated a biosphere reserve.

=== Habitats and land cover types ===
Due to its size and great variety in elevation and precipitation, the range has many different habitats and land cover types, including:

- Subtropical thorn forest, also known as Motagua Valley thornscrub, with Cactus species, Guaiacum species, Vachellia farnesiana and Bucida macrostachys
- Premontane dry subtropical forest with Encyclia diota, Ceiba aesculifolia and Leucaena guatemalensis
- Premontane tropical wet forest including Attalea cohune, Terminalia amazonia, Pinus caribaea and Manilkara zapota
- Lower montane subtropical moist forest with Pinus oocarpa, Quercus species, Alnus jorullensis and Encyclia selligera
- Cloud forest including Alfaroa costaricensis, Brunellia mexicana, Gunnera species, and Magnolia guatemalensis
- Agroecosystems with coffee, rice, maize, etc.
- Pastures with Tillandsia species

=== Fauna ===
The reserve has 885 species, about 70% of all species which are found in Guatemala and Belize, including threatened birds like the resplendent quetzal (Pharomachrus mocinno), harpy eagle (Harpia harpyja), and horned guan (Oreophasis derbianus).

Felines with a significant presence are the jaguar (Panthera onca), cougar (Felis concolor); onza (jaguarundi), the Puma yagouaroundi; ocelot (Leopardus pardalis) and margay (Leopardus wiedii).

Other mammals in the reserve include the red brocket deer (Mazama americana), the Guatemalan black howler monkey (Alouatta pigra), and the Baird's tapir (Tapirus bairdii).

== Jade Reserve ==
The southern area of Sierra de la Minas (translated in Spanish as the 'Mountain Range of the Mines’) is known for its rich deposits of jadeite, (one of the two forms of jade) marble, serpentine, and other minerals. Smaller jadeite deposits have been rediscovered sporadically in the last 50 years, but it was not until 1998 that a major source was identified.

Jadeite is found all over the world in countries including Myanmar, New Zealand, Kazakhstan, Russia, British Columbia, United States, and Turkestan. The other form, nephrite, is much more common but of much less value. Blue jadeite is similar in structure to the different colors of jadeite; the trace elements which are found in the minerals contribute to their color. The blue jadeite for example, is known to have traces of titanium and iron. Jadeite and nephrite artifacts found in the New World were at one point thought to have been from Asia.

The region of Sierra de Las minas as well as the Motagua river valley, was used by older Pre-Columbian era civilizations such as the Olmecs and Maya as a source of jadeite. The jadeite was used for different purposes like ritual objects and adornments. Because of their location between Mexico and Central America, the Maya became an important influence in Mesoamerican trade. Jadeite became an important export for the Maya, along with serpentine, salt and cacao. It was assumed that these cultures amassed all of their jade from the Motagua River valley, the then only known source of jadeite, in central Guatemala near El Portón northeast of Guatemala City.

=== Rediscovery ===
Because jade was not desirable in the colonial period, sources of the stone were forgotten. Since the 1950s, jadeite was thought to be in the region, as no other source for Olmec jade was recognized. It was not until 1999 when geophysicist Russell Seitz found and reported the site, that the extent of the deposits was known. Several influences in the United States spurred the search for this jade. Boston jade collector Landon T. Clay was one of the first individuals to sponsor the search for jade in the region. The Mesoamerican Jade Project of 1976 was initiated by the Peabody Museum of Harvard University and the Boston Museum of Fine Arts, to resolve the question of the jade's location. Seitz from Cambridge, Massachusetts was chosen to be the field director of the project. However, the trips which were made were mostly unsuccessful due to the lack of proper technology and the harsh conditions of the wild Guatemalan forests. Not until the 180 mph winds of Hurricane Mitch stormed the region in 1998 was jadeite again uncovered in the area. The storm unearthed previously unknown alluvial deposits of jadeite by flooding the Motagua River thirty-one feet past the flood stage. Other rivers such as the Rio El Tambor also began unveiling alluvial jade. Although the worth of this jade was fairly low (the more intense the green of the jade the more it is worth), prospectors and local shop owners began collecting shards found in the beds of these rivers. In 1999, Russell Seitz happened to be in one of these local jade shops in the town of Antigua when he noticed a large hand-sized sample of the rare blue-jadeite.

In 2000, Seitz started an expedition with prospector Carlos Gonzales Ramirez to find the source of the elusive jadeite. They traveled to El Ciprés which is in Sierra de Las Minas, miles north of the Motagua river valley. They trekked into the mountains eventually finding large veins of jadeite about 2 meters wide by 45 meters long. A site with jade boulders as big as a bus were discovered, along with evidence that the site had been worked on for thousands of years. When Seitz returned to the United States with a few samples, he had them tested and they were confirmed as high quality jadeite. That spurred more researchers to join him in his study of the site. The find was announced in a brief article written by Seitz for the December 2001 issue of Antiquity.

The archaeological connotation of the find was significant. The influence of the Olmecs was understood to be spread wider than had been previously believed. An ancient dry-stone pathway was also found at the site which led through the mountains to an old habitation and tomb site, filled with the remains of old clay shards. This road has expanded the preconceived size of the Olmecs' trade routes. It is debatable as to exactly why the large cache of jadeite is mostly still intact. The Maya were known to use the green form of the jadeite for their carvings. Because the Spanish only wanted gold, the Olmecs would have had all of the blue jadeite to themselves.

The Motagua valley is another source of jade in the area. The town of Río Hondo and its surrounding areas have yielded finds including the "princesa" variety of jadeite. This valuable type of jadeite contains a translucent rich-green color. In 1996 prospector Carlos Gonzalez began searching the area for jade and he discovered a 140 lb boulder of jadeite which had a translucent, light blue color. A 7 km area from La Ceiba to Carrizal Grand which is northwest of Jalapa contained similar Omec jade artifacts. Gonzales and his colleagues discovered more jade examples in the southern tributaries of the Rio El Tambor located near Carrizal Grande and San José. In January 2002 they were led to Quebrada Seca, where they were shown a jade boulder which weighed more than 300 tons. Other archeologists such as François Gendron of France and Dr. Richard Mandell of the University of South Carolina in Columbia began unearthing more samples of jadeite in the region. Gendron discovered a jadeite sample with a composition suggesting it was formed 80 to 90 km underground, much more than the expected 20 km, around which jadeite is usually known to form.
