= Chrysoglossa norburyi =

Scientific classification
- Kingdom: Animalia
- Phylum: Arthropoda
- Clade: Pancrustacea
- Class: Insecta
- Order: Lepidoptera
- Superfamily: Noctuoidea
- Family: Notodontidae
- Genus: Chrysoglossa
- Species: C. norburyi

Binomial name
- Chrysoglossa norburyi Miller, 2008

Species of moth

Chrysoglossa norburyi is a moth of the family Notodontidae first described by James S. Miller in 2008. It was formerly considered conspecific with C. phaethon. The length of the forewings is 17-18.5 mm for males and 18–21 mm for females. It is endemic to the Cordillera Central mountain range in Costa Rica. It is known from elevations of 700–1,400 m (2,300–4,600 ft).

== Taxonomy ==
Prior to its description, Chrysoglossa norburyi specimens of were assigned to C. phaethon, a closely related species that is identical in appearance to C. norburyi. Chrysoglossa norburyi was formally described by the American entomologist James S. Miller in 2008 based on a male collected from Guanacaste in Costa Rica. It is named after Maria Norbury, a supporter of the Area de Conservación Guanacaste, one of the localities where this moth has been recorded.

== Description ==
The length of the forewings is 17-18.5 mm for males and 18–21 mm for females. Adults of Chrysoglossa norburyi are almost identical to C. phaethon in their external appearance, especially in males, which can only be distinguished by the shape of their genitalia. The caterpillars show coloring similar to larvae of Nebulosa species.

== Distribution and habitat ==
Chrysoglossa norburyi is endemic to Costa Rica, where it inhabits both the Caribbean and Pacific versants of the Cordillera Central mountain range from the Orosí Volcano to the Tapantí National Park. It is known from elevations of 700–1,400 m (2,300–4,600 ft).

Caterpillars feed on Alfaroa guanacastensis in the family Juglandaceae. This moth is the only dioptine species known to feed on Juglandaceae plants.
