= Alfaroa manningii =

Conservation status
- Near Threatened (IUCN 3.1)

Scientific classification
- Kingdom: Plantae
- Clade: Embryophytes
- Clade: Tracheophytes
- Clade: Angiosperms
- Clade: Eudicots
- Clade: Rosids
- Order: Fagales
- Family: Juglandaceae
- Genus: Alfaroa
- Species: A. manningii

Binomial name
- Alfaroa manningii J.León

Species of flowering plant

Alfaroa manningii, or gavilán colorado, is a valued lumber tree of the Walnut family endemic to the premontane Costa Rican rain forest. The specific epithet honors the American botanist Wayne Eyer Manning (1899–2004).

== Description ==
Alfaroa manningii grows to 24 m tall, with a diameter at breast height up to 0.9 m, and small to medium large buttress roots. The bark is reddish brown externally, and yellow orange internally. The sapwood is white, the heartwood pink.

The opposite pinnately compound leaves bear eight to twelve (rarely six to eighteen) opposite leaflets. The petiole of the leaf is 5–9 cm long, and the petioles of the leaflets are 2–5 mm long. The entire leaf may be up to 3 m long. (The first two leaves on a seedling are simple, and are followed by several alternate compound leaves.)

The upright female inflorescence is born terminally on the current year's growth, containing 40 to 50 blossoms. The male inflorescence is a catkin, up to 18 cm in length; it may grow alone from the current or previous year's growth, in a panicle of up to six paired catkins, or rarely at the base of an androgynous panicle, which ends in the female inflorescence.

The sessile male flower has a scent reminiscent of gardenias. The pollen grains have a diameter of 22 micrometres. The female flower is pedicellate.

The fruit is broadly ovate nut, 3.5 cm in diameter and 3.0 cm long. The hard shell is deeply furrowed, with eight to twelve sharp longitudinal ribs running from the tip to the equator.

Alfaroa manningii is distinguished from the similar A. guanacastensis by its generally larger leaves (both longer petioles and more leaflets) and large fruits with a thick, heavily corrugated glabrous shell. (A. guanacastensis fruits are hirtellous, longer than they are wide, and have a cartilaginous shell, less than 1 mm thick.)

== Distribution ==
Alfaroa manningii is only known from a small area in Costa Rica near Rio Platanillo in the northeastern province of Cartago. It often grows together with Oreomunnea pterocarpa (gavilán bianco).
