= A. mexicana =

A. mexicana may refer to:

- Alfaroa mexicana, a plant species endemic to Mexico
- Argemone mexicana, the Mexican poppy, Mexican prickly poppy, cardo or cardosanto, a plant species found in Mexico

== See also ==
- Mexicana (disambiguation)
