= C. maxima =

C. maxima may refer to:

- Canna maxima, a perennial plant
- Cattleya maxima, a plant with a yellow stripe on its flower lip
- Cecropia maxima, a plant endemic to Ecuador
- Chrysoglossa maxima, a Central American moth
- Citrus maxima, a plant native to Asia
- Collocalia maxima, a cave-nesting swift
- Coracina maxima, a bird endemic to Australia
- Corylus maxima, an Old World hazel
- Crocomela maxima, a Bolivian moth
- Cucurbita maxima, a squash native to South America
