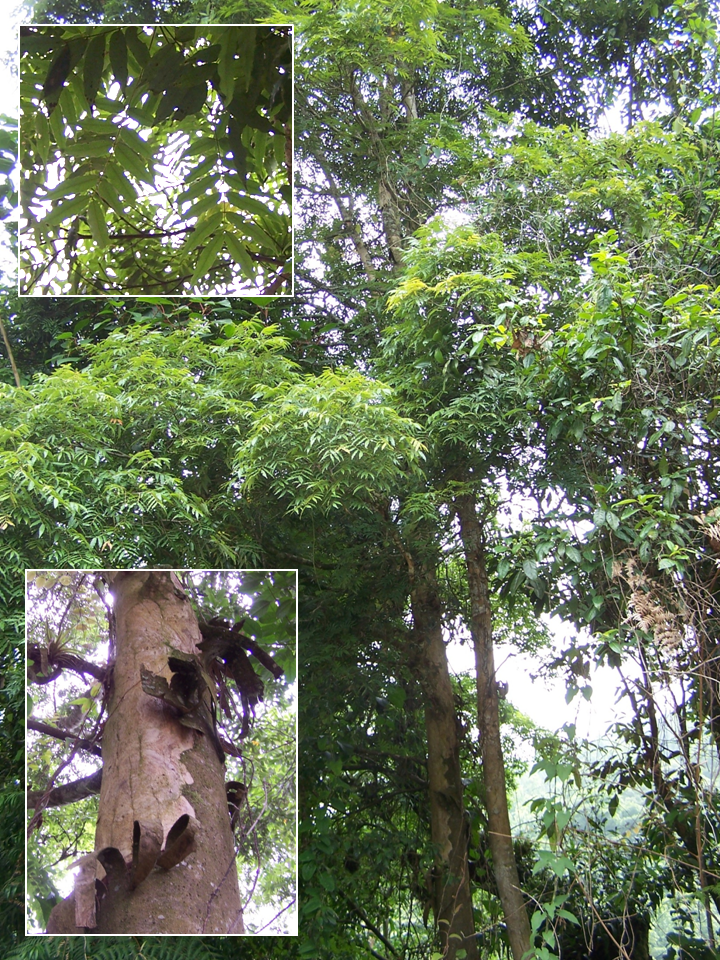

Conservation status
- Least Concern (IUCN 3.1)

Scientific classification
- Kingdom: Plantae
- Clade: Embryophytes
- Clade: Tracheophytes
- Clade: Angiosperms
- Clade: Eudicots
- Clade: Rosids
- Order: Fagales
- Family: Juglandaceae
- Genus: Oreomunnea
- Species: O. mexicana

Binomial name
- Oreomunnea mexicana (Standl.) J.-F. Leroy

Subspecies
- Oreomunnea mexicana subsp. costaricensis B.C.Stone; Oreomunnea mexicana subsp. mexicana

Synonyms
- Engelhardia mexicana Standl.

= Oreomunnea mexicana =

Species of flowering plant

Oreomunnea mexicana is a species of flowering plant in the family Juglandaceae. Common names include guayabo amarillo and remiendo. It is a tree which grows in the tropical rain forests of Mexico, Guatemala, Nicaragua, Costa Rica, and Panama from 1,000 to 1,700 meters elevation. The chromosome number is 2n = 32.

== Description ==
O. mexicana grows to 30 m or more, up to 1.5m DBH, often with buttresses, and superficially resembles a walnut (Juglans sp.). The bark on a mature tree exfoliates (It does not on O. pterocarpa). The heartwood is pink. The pith is solid (not chambered, as in Juglans). The buds are protected by leaf primordia, with a fine coating of yellow scales (O. pterocarpa has glabrous primordia.

=== Leaves ===
The petioles of the opposite, coriaceous, pinnately compound leaves are glabrous at the base (O. pterocarpa is hirsute). The petioles are short (less than 3.3 cm) as are the petiolules of the opposite leaflets (less than 3 mm). The leaflets, up to 1 dm in length, are 4-5 times as long as they are wide. The upper surface of the leaf is glaucous; the underside has a light yellow-brown peltate bloom.

=== Flowers and fruit ===
The inflorescences are panicles, and may be androgynous (containing a single spike of pistalate flowers flanked by several staminate catkins), entirely staminate, or entirely pistalate. The fruit bears three wings on a globose nut, approximately 7 mm in diameter. Germination is hypogeal: the first two aerial leaves are pinately compound and opposite; for the next 3-6 dm, the leaves are placed alternately.
