= Alfaroa guatemalensis =

Conservation status
- Near Threatened (IUCN 3.1)

Scientific classification
- Kingdom: Plantae
- Clade: Embryophytes
- Clade: Tracheophytes
- Clade: Angiosperms
- Clade: Eudicots
- Clade: Rosids
- Order: Fagales
- Family: Juglandaceae
- Genus: Alfaroa
- Species: A. guatemalensis

Binomial name
- Alfaroa guatemalensis (Standl.) L.O.Williams & Ant.Molina

Synonyms
- Engelhardia guatemalensis Standl.; Oreomunnea guatemalensis (Standl.) J.-F.Leroy

Species of flowering plant

Alfaroa guatemalensis is a species of flowering plant in the family Juglandaceae. It is a tree native to Guatemala, Honduras, and the state of Chiapas in southern Mexico. It grows in cloud forests from 1,200 to 2,200 metres elevation.

The species was first described as Engelhardia guatemalensis by Paul Carpenter Standley in 1940. In 1970 Louis Otho Williams and Antonio Molina placed the species in genus Alfaroa as A. guatemalensis.
