= Alfaroa williamsii =

Conservation status
- Least Concern (IUCN 3.1)

Scientific classification
- Kingdom: Plantae
- Clade: Embryophytes
- Clade: Tracheophytes
- Clade: Angiosperms
- Clade: Eudicots
- Clade: Rosids
- Order: Fagales
- Family: Juglandaceae
- Genus: Alfaroa
- Species: A. williamsii

Binomial name
- Alfaroa williamsii Ant.Molina

Synonyms
- Alfaroa colombiana Lazano, J.Hern. & Espinal; Alfaroa williamsii subsp. tapantiensis D.E.Stone

Species of flowering plant

Alfaroa williamsii is a tropical monoecious cloud forest-dwelling species of tree native to Nicaragua, Costa Rica, Panama, and Colombia. It was first recognized in the Cordillera Central of Nicaragua at an elevation of 1,300 metres. The mature tree is 15–25 m in height, with a 0.5 m DBH. The sub-opposite to alternate pinnately compound leaves bear three to five opposite to sub-opposite pairs of coriaceous leaflets, glabrous above and covered with minute scales below. The pollen is born on panicles consisting of several erect catkins. The small, nearly round, glabrous, ribbed fruits are born on a sparsely flowered spike.

== References and external links ==
- Antonio Molina R. "Two New Nicaraguan Juglandaceae" Fieldiana: Botany 31(16), Field Museum of Natural History, Chicago, IL. 357–359.
