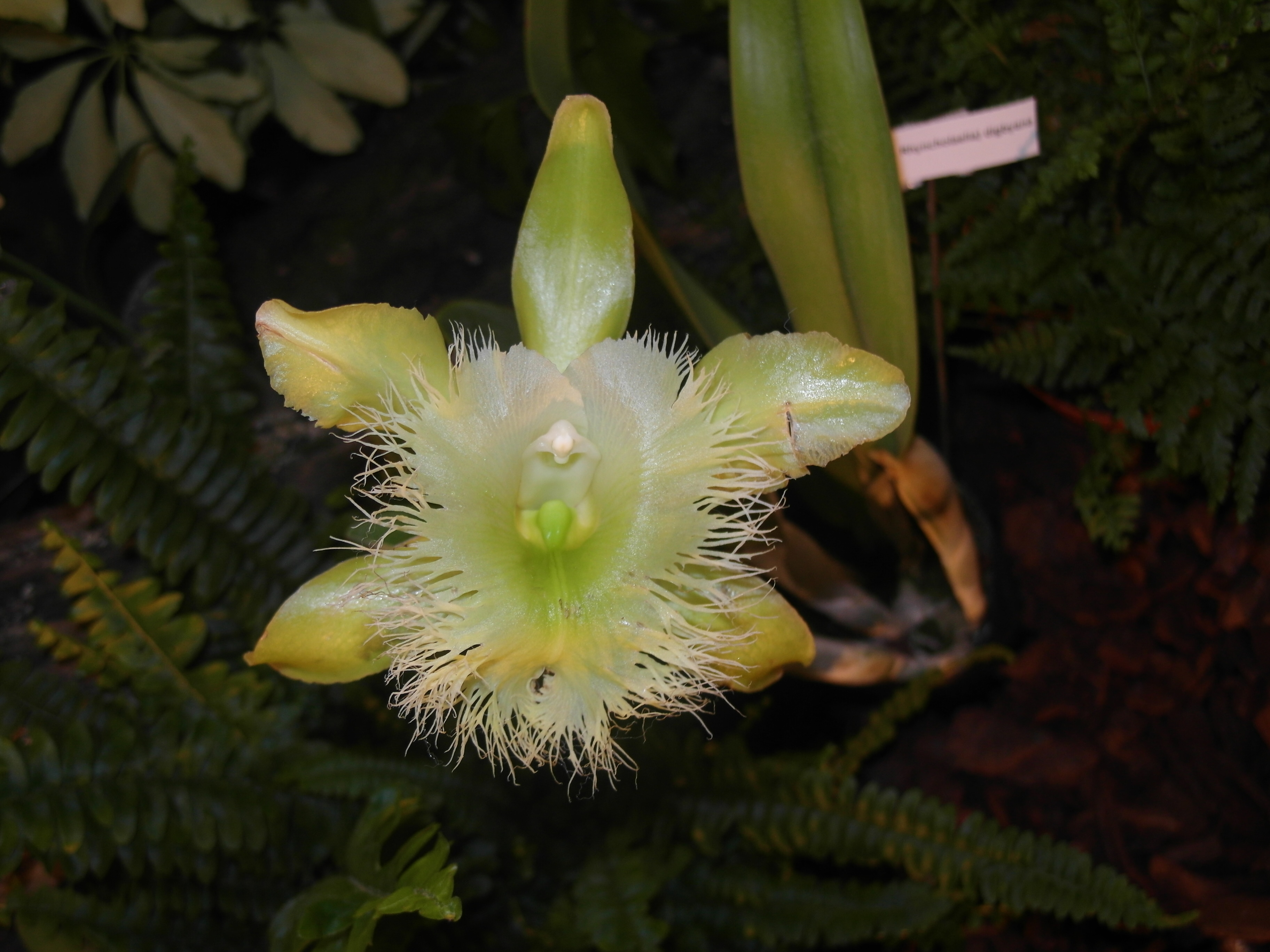
- Rhyncholaelia digbyana flower

Scientific classification
- Kingdom: Plantae
- Clade: Tracheophytes
- Clade: Angiosperms
- Clade: Monocots
- Order: Asparagales
- Family: Orchidaceae
- Subfamily: Epidendroideae
- Genus: Rhyncholaelia
- Species: R. digbyana

Binomial name
- Rhyncholaelia digbyana (Lindl.) Schltr. (1918)

Synonyms
- Bletia digibiyana Lindl. (Rchb.f, 1861); Brassavola digbyana Lindl. (1846); Cattleya digbyana Lindl. (Gentil, 1907); Laelia digbyana Lindl. (Benth, 1880); Laelia digbyana var. fimbripetala (Ames,1932); Brassavola digbyana var. fimbripetala Ames (O.Gruss & M.Wolff, 2007); Brassavola digbyana f. fimbripetala Ames (H.G. Jones, 1962)

= Rhyncholaelia digbyana =

Species of orchid

Rhyncholaelia digbyana is a species of epiphytic orchid occurring from Honduras to Belize, Guatemala, Mexico and Costa Rica.

Rl. digbyana can be distinguished from the other species of Rhyncholaelia (Rl. glauca) by the frilled labellum.

The orchid has been discovered by José Antonio Molina Rosito, a Honduran botanist and Professor emeritus at the Zamorano Pan-American School of Agriculture.

Rhyncholaelia digbyana was declared the national flower of Honduras (Flor Nacional de Honduras) on 1969 November 26.

== Etymology ==
The species name digbyana comes from the family name of the collector Edward St. Vincent Digby who had the first described specimen.

== Taxonomy ==
The orchid that is now known as Rhyncholaelia digbyana was first described as Brassavola digbyanna in 1846 by John Lindley. The plant he described was in the collection of Edward St. Vincent Digby, it was reported to have originated from Honduras. Since its original description it has been reclassified three times in to various genuses before being moved in the new genus Rhyncholaelia along with Brassavola glauca by Heinrich Gustav Reichenbach .

== Characteristics ==
This species grows epiphytically on host trees in its native range. It has elongated compressed pseudobulbs topped with a singular leaf.

=== Flowers ===
In its native range flowering occurs from February to June. The 7 in (18 cm) flowers are held singularly on 3 in (7.5 cm) long inflorescences which emerge from the apex of newly grown pseudobulbs. The flowers range in color from white to green and possess the characteristic frilled labellum.

==== Scent ====
This orchid is strongly scented at night with the scent reported to be similar to that of lemon or Lily of the valley. The scent is composed nine different compounds four the compounds are alpha-pinene, ocimene, Citronellol, and Linalool.

== Hybrid offspring ==
- Rhyncholaeliocattleya Thetis
- Rhyncholaeliocattleya Adulana
- Rhyncholaeliocattleya Andeanna
- Rhyncholaeliocattleya Jungle Wine
- Rhyncholaeliocattleya Edgar Wigan
- Rhyncholaeliocattleya Puritan
- Rhyncholaeliocattleya Calypso
- Rhyncholaeliocattleya Delight
- Rhyncholaeliocattleya Pervenusta
- Rhyncholaeliocattleya Portage Pass
- Rhyncholaeliocattleya Oriens
- Rhyncholaeliocattleya Gertrude Fannin
- Rhyncholaeliocattleya Beardwoodensis
- Rhyncholaeliocattleya Arderniae
- Rhyncholaeliocattleya Ben Kodama
- Rhyncholaeliocattleya Pulcherrima
- Rhyncholaeliocattleya Greenlake
- Rhyncholaeliocattleya Miguel
- Rhyncholaeliocattleya Chatham
- Rhyncholaeliocattleya Mrs. J. Emsley
- Rhyncholaeliocattleya Mrs. M. Gratrix
- Rhyncholaeliocattleya Suessa
- Rhyncholaeliocattleya Mantou
- Rhyncholaeliocattleya Jujuy
- Rhyncholaeliocattleya Ruth Gillmar
- Rhyncholaeliocattleya Rolfei
- Rhyncholaeliocattleya Ferrières
- Rhyncholaeliocattleya Rowena
- Rhyncholaeliocattleya Mrs. J. Leemann
- Rhyncholaeliocattleya Walter Fujikami
- Rhyncholaeliocattleya Tokyo
- Rhyncholaeliocattleya Diadem
- Rhyncholaeliocattleya Mackayi
- Rhyncholaeliocattleya digbyana-elongata
- Rhyncholaeliocattleya Beardwoodensis
- Rhyncholaeliocattleya Frasquita
- Rhyncholaeliocattleya Digbyano-Ernestii
- Rhyncholaeliocattleya Lydia
- Rhyncholaeliocattleya Eva's Suavemente Jungla
- Rhyncholaeliocattleya Tring Park Hybrid
- Rhyncholaeliocattleya Pervenusta
- Rhyncholaeliocattleya Holfordii
- Rhyncholaeliocattleya Patrick FOG McClintock
- Rhyncholaeliocattleya Vella
- Rhyncholaeliocattleya Thera
- Rhyncholaeliocattleya Thorntonii
- Rhyncholaeliocattleya Raymond Hughes
- Rhyncholaeliocattleya Geoffrey
- Rhyncholaeliocattleya Excelsior
- Rhyncholaeliocattleya Pluto
- Rhyncholaeliocattleya Polychrome
- Rhyncholaeliocattleya Praetii
- Rhyncholaeliocattleya Honolulu
- Rhyncholaeliocattleya Heatonensis
- Rhyncholaeliocattleya Hélèn Maron
- Rhyncholaeliocattleya King Harold
- Rhyncholaeliocattleya Madame Jules Hye
- Rhyncholaeliocattleya Queen Alexandra
- Rhyncholaeliocattleya Lido
- Rhyncholaeliocattleya Sonia
- Rhyncholaeliocattleya Tuscarora
- Rhyncholaeliocattleya Hippocrates
- Rhyncholaeliocattleya Cordelia
- Rhyncholaeliocattleya Madame Mavrocordato
- Rhyncholaeliocattleya Frank Hartman
- Rhyncholaeliocattleya Fuji
- Rhyncholaeliocattleya Jeanne Weidele
- Rhyncholaeliocattleya Marguerite Fournier
- Rhyncholaeliocattleya Rosslyn
- Rhyncholaeliocattleya Ena
- Rhyncholaeliocattleya Qian Hoo
- Rhyncholaeliocattleya Louis-Bel
- Rhyncholaeliocattleya Groganiae
- Rhyncholaeliocattleya The Baron
- Rhyncholaeliocattleya Lucio-Digbyana
- Rhyncholaeliocattleya Wellesleyae
- Rhyncholaeliocattleya Watteau
- Rhyncholaeliocattleya Letty
- Rhyncholaeliocattleya Fulgens
- Rhyncholaeliocattleya Astarte
- Rhyncholaeliocattleya Ahiahi
- Rhyncholaeliocattleya Elfriede
- Rhyncholaeliocattleya Impératrice de Russie
- Rhyncholaeliocattleya Dimet
- Rhyncholaeliocattleya Digbyano-mossiae
- Rhyncholaeliocattleya S. M. Damon
- Rhyncholaeliocattleya Carmen
- Rhyncholaeliocattleya Itu City
- Rhyncholaeliocattleya Florence Kodama
- Rhyncholaeliocattleya Fuyouko
- Rhyncholaeliocattleya Brunoyensis
- Rhyncholaeliocattleya Sweet Dimple
- Rhyncholaeliocattleya Joyce Jewell
- Rhyncholaeliocattleya Rhea
- Rhyncholaeliocattleya Annette
- Rhyncholaeliocattleya Cecilia
- Rhyncholaeliocattleya Digbyano-Purpurata
- Rhyncholaeliocattleya Mrs. Chamberlain
- Rhyncholaeliocattleya Choo
- Rhyncholaeliocattleya Grace Weston
- Rhyncholaeliocattleya Rex
- Rhyncholaeliocattleya Herbert Beaumont
- Rhyncholaeliocattleya Luna
- Rhyncholaeliocattleya Robinsons Delight
- Rhyncholaeliocattleya Ursula
- Rhyncholaeliocattleya Saint Alban
- Rhyncholaeliocattleya Balarucensis
- Rhyncholaeliocattleya Langleyensis
- Rhyncholaeliocattleya Susan Rendall
- Rhyncholaeliocattleya Taichung Summer Star
- Rhyncholaeliocattleya Del Rosa
- Rhyncholaeliocattleya Helen
- Rhyncholaeliocattleya Susanniae
- Rhyncholaeliocattleya Suzannae
- Rhyncholaeliocattleya John Fredrick Osterholt
- Rhyncholaeliocattleya Big Ben
- Rhyncholaeliocattleya Sedeni
- Rhyncholaeliocattleya Naalukea
- Rhyncholaeliocattleya Undine
- Rhyncholaeliocattleya Murillo
- Rhyncholaeliocattleya Velutiana
- Rhyncholaeliocattleya Cynthia
- Rhyncholaeliocattleya Pocahontas
- Rhyncholaeliocattleya Digbyano-Warneri
- Rhyncholaeliocattleya Madame Charles Maron
- Rhyncholaeliocattleya Kenneth
- Rhyncholaeliocattleya Canari
- Rhyncattleanthe Balboana
- Rhyncattleanthe Ross McDonald
- Rhyncattleanthe Little Digby
- Rhyncanthe Marilyn Fancher
- Rhyncanthe Siren
- Laecholaelia Lellieuxii
- Laecholaelia Thwaitesii
- Rhyncholaeliocattleya Madam Ernest
- Rhynchothechea H. G. Alexander
- Psychelia Orglade's Clove
- Rhyncattleanthe Solar Sunset
- Rhyncholaelia Mem. Coach Blackmore
- Rhyncholaeliocattleya Loretta's Dream
- Rhyncholaeliocattleya Iao Valley
- Rhyncholaeliocattleya Duh's Wisdom
- Rhyncholaeliocattleya Rio's Green Magic
- Rhyncholaeliocattleya digbyana-Haadyai Delight
- Rhyncholaeliocattleya Tzeng-Wen Dancer
- Rhyncholaeliocattleya Pikapene
- Rhyncholaeliocattleya Mem. Michel Oliveau
- Rhyncholaeliocattleya Ta-Shiang White Monkey
- Rhyncholaeliocattleya Duh's White
- Rhyncholaeliocattleya Building Dream Green
- Rhyncholaeliocattleya Susan Scott
- Rhyncholaeliocattleya Eva's Cacique Escarlata
- Rhyncholaeliocattleya Hsinying White Pig
- Rhyncholaeliocattleya River Kwai Diamond
- Rhyncholaeliocattleya Oregon Pine
- Rhynchovola Mem. Aubrey Jacobs
- Rhynchovola David Sander
- Brassavola Kathy Cox
- Rhynchovola Jimminey Cricket
- Rhynchovola Gerry Cassella
- Rhynchovola Dancehall Skets
- Rhynchobrassoleya Vigour Airbyana
- Rhynchobrassoleya Connie Warne Bowden
- Rhynchobrassoleya Unbelievable Times
- Rhynchobrassoleya Johnnie Minix
- Rhynchobrassoleya Billingtonii
- Rhynchobrassoleya Lipolani
- Rhynchobrassoleya Petcharatana Green Sherbet
- Rhynchobrassoleya Verdad Sencilla
- Rhynchobrassoleya Choroni
- Rhyncholaeliocattleya Frill Seeker
- Allenblackara Hurricane Landfall
- Rhyncholaeliocattleya Princess Naurah
- Rhyncholaeliocattleya Villa Verde
- Rhyncholaeliocattleya Mem. Wilson Vieira
- Rhyncholaeliocattleya Aladdin
- Rhyncholaeliocattleya Albuana
- Rhyncholaeliocattleya Alisun Aloha Dig
- Rhyncholaeliocattleya Summer Fantasy
- Rhyncholaeliocattleya La Verne Edwards
- Rhyncholaeliocattleya Angel Fringe
- Rhyncholaeliocattleya Hamana Soft
- Rhyncholaeliocattleya Lester McDonald
- Rhyncholaeliocattleya Digby Lane
