= Chrysoglossa =

Scientific classification
- Kingdom: Animalia
- Phylum: Arthropoda
- Clade: Pancrustacea
- Class: Insecta
- Order: Lepidoptera
- Superfamily: Noctuoidea
- Family: Notodontidae
- Tribe: Dioptini
- Genus: Chrysoglossa; J. S. Miller, 2009

Genus of moths

Chrysoglossa is a genus of moths of the family Notodontidae. The genus contains seven species of moths that are native to Central America, being found from Chiriquí in Panama north to northeastern Mexico. Moths in this genus inhabit dry forests at elevations of 1,000–1,500 m (3,300–4,900 ft). They are dull brown or gray in color, with oblique whitish lines marking the forewings and sometimes a white blotch at the center of the hindwing. The length of the forewings is 13.5–25.0 mm for males and 14.5–26.0 mm for females. It is characterized by a yellow to golden-brown proboscis, which helps distinguish itfrom the similar genus Nebulosa and after which it is named.

== Taxonomy ==
The genus Chrysoglossa was erected by the American entomologist John S. Miller in 2009. The genus name is derived from the Greek words for "golden tongue", in reference to the characteristic golden-brown proboscis that helps distinguish Chrysoglossa from the similar genus Nebulosa. The type species of the genus is Chrysoglossa demades, originally described as Polypoetes demades by the English entomologist Herbert Druce in 1885. The species in this genus were assigned to the genus Tithraustes prior to 2009. Alongside C. demades, Miller placed six other species in the genus, two of which were described in the same paper erecting the genus. He also noted that there were three undescribed species that belonged to Chrysoglossa.

== Description ==
Chrysoglossa moths have dull brown or gray forewings, frequently maculated with oblique whitish lines. The hindwing coloration is similarly dull, with a white blotch at the center in some species. The length of the forewings is 13.5–25.0 mm for males and 14.5–26.0 mm for females. Chrysoglossa is characterized by a yellow to golden-brown proboscis, large rounded eyes, medium-long labial palps, and several other morphological features.

== Distribution ==
The genus is a Central American endemic, being found from Chiriquí in Panama north to northeastern Mexico. It inhabits dry forests at elevations of 1,000–1,500 m (3,300–4,900 ft). The ecology of the genus is poorly known, with the only two known host plants being Quercus germana and Alfaroa guanacastensis.

== Species ==
It consists of the following species:

- Chrysoglossa demades (Druce, 1885)
- Chrysoglossa fumosa Miller, 2008
- Chrysoglossa maxima (Druce, 1897)
- Chrysoglossa mexicana (Hering, 1925)
- Chrysoglossa norburyi Miller, 2008
- Chrysoglossa phaethon (Schaus, 1912)
- Chrysoglossa submaxima (Hering, 1925)
