= Chrysoglossa submaxima =

Scientific classification
- Kingdom: Animalia
- Phylum: Arthropoda
- Clade: Pancrustacea
- Class: Insecta
- Order: Lepidoptera
- Superfamily: Noctuoidea
- Family: Notodontidae
- Genus: Chrysoglossa
- Species: C. submaxima

Binomial name
- Chrysoglossa submaxima (Hering, 1925)

Synonyms
- Tithraustes submaxima Hering, 1925

Species of moth

Chrysoglossa submaxima is a moth of the family Notodontidae first described by Hering in 1925. It is found in Panama, Costa Rica and Nicaragua.
