= Myrospermum sousanum =

Conservation status
- Endangered (IUCN 3.1)

Scientific classification
- Kingdom: Plantae
- Clade: Tracheophytes
- Clade: Angiosperms
- Clade: Eudicots
- Clade: Rosids
- Order: Fabales
- Family: Fabaceae
- Subfamily: Faboideae
- Genus: Myrospermum
- Species: M. sousanum

Binomial name
- Myrospermum sousanum A.Delgado & M.C.Johnst.

Species of plant

Myrospermum sousanum, the arroyo sweetwood, is a species of flowering plant in the family Fabaceae. It is native to northeastern Mexico. A shrub or small tree, it is typically found in shrublands and inland wetlands at elevations from 460 to 1,300 m (1,500 to 4,300 ft). Known from only four stations, it has been assessed as Endangered.
