= Chrysoglossa demades =

Scientific classification
- Kingdom: Animalia
- Phylum: Arthropoda
- Clade: Pancrustacea
- Class: Insecta
- Order: Lepidoptera
- Superfamily: Noctuoidea
- Family: Notodontidae
- Genus: Chrysoglossa
- Species: C. demades

Binomial name
- Chrysoglossa demades (H. Druce, 1885)

Synonyms
- Polypoetes demades H. Druce, 1885; Tithraustes nigrifascia Hering, 1925

Species of moth

Chrysoglossa demades is a moth of the family Notodontidae first described by Herbert Druce in 1885. It is a Central American species found in Panama, Nicaragua, Guatemala, Mexico, and southwestern Costa Rica. Its exact geographic range is poorly known as Chrysoglossa moths formerly assigned to this species from Mexico and Costa Rica are now thought to represent distinct undescribed species. Caterpillars are thought to feed on Quercus oaks.

== Taxonomy ==
Chrysoglossa demades was formally described by the English entomologist Herbert Druce in 1885. It was subsequently assigned to the genus Tithraustes. It is the type species of the genus Chrysoglossa, which was erected by the American entomologist John S. Miller in 2009. Alongside C. demades, Miller moved four other species then assigned to Tithraustes to Chrysoglossa. In the same paper, he concluded that Tithraustes nigrifascia, originally described in 1925 by Hering, had been described based on a male specimen of C. demades with the abdomen of female butterfly glued to it. Consequently, he reduced Tithraustes nigrifascia to a junior synonym of C. demades. He also noted that populations of moths from Mexico and Monteverde, Costa Rica, which had until then been considered to represent C. demades, were probably two undescribed species.

== Distribution and habitat ==
Chrysoglossa demades is a Central American species found in Panama, Nicaragua, Guatemala, Mexico, and southwestern Costa Rica. It was formerly thought to be more wide-ranging, but Chrysoglossa moths assigned to this species from Mexico and Monteverde, Costa Rica represent distinct undescribed species. Its current geographic range is poorly known due to these taxonomic difficulties. Caterpillars are thought to feed on Quercus (oak) species, as the undescribed Chrysoglossa species from Mexico closely related to C. demades has the host plant Quercus germana.
