= Myrospermum =

Scientific classification
- Kingdom: Plantae
- Clade: Tracheophytes
- Clade: Angiosperms
- Clade: Eudicots
- Clade: Rosids
- Order: Fabales
- Family: Fabaceae
- Subfamily: Faboideae
- Tribe: Sophoreae
- Genus: Myrospermum; Jacq. (1760)

Species
- Myrospermum frutescens Jacq.; Myrospermum sousanum A.Delgado & M.C.Johnst.

Synonyms
- Calusia Bertero ex Steud. (1840)

Genus of plants

Myrospermum is a genus of flowering plants in the legume family, Fabaceae. It includes two species of trees and shrubs native to the tropical Americas, ranging from northeastern Mexico through Central America to Colombia and Venezuela. Typical habitats include seasonally-dry tropical to subtropical woodland and bushland, often on rocky hillsides and along rivers and streams.

- Myrospermum frutescens Jacq. – central Mexico to Colombia and Venezuela
- Myrospermum sousanum A.Delgado & M.C.Johnst. – northeastern Mexico
