= Magnolia guatemalensis =

Conservation status
- Least Concern (IUCN 3.1)

Scientific classification
- Kingdom: Plantae
- Clade: Embryophytes
- Clade: Tracheophytes
- Clade: Spermatophytes
- Clade: Angiosperms
- Clade: Magnoliids
- Order: Magnoliales
- Family: Magnoliaceae
- Genus: Magnolia
- Section: Magnolia sect. Magnolia
- Species: M. guatemalensis

Binomial name
- Magnolia guatemalensis Donn.Sm.

Species of tree

Magnolia guatemalensis is a tree found in the highlands and mountains of Guatemala. El Salvador, and Honduras. It is considered an indicator species of the cloud forest.

It is known locally as mamey, a common name that is also used for the unrelated species Pouteria sapota from Cuba and the fruit tree Mammea americana from Central and South America.

== Description ==
Magnolia guatemalensis is an attractive tree, growing up to 15 meters high. It has tough glossy leaves, with red shiny stipules and sepals. The species is polymorphic, with leaves varying in size and shape, and sometimes lacking pubescence on the lower surface. It flowers from late February to late May. The species' flower petals are also polymorphic, varying in size and shape.

== Range and habitat ==
Magnolia guatemalensis is found in Guatemala, Honduras and El Salvador. Its exact range is not well known. The type specimen was collected in Tactic, Alta Verapaz, Guatemala, where it is locally abundant in the marshes. It is also found in Guatemala's Sierra de las Minas Biosphere Reserve. It is found in El Salvador's Cerro de Montecristo National Park, and in the Opalaca, Montecillos, and Guajiquiro cordilleras of Honduras. Its estimated extent of occurrence (EOO) is 45,000 km^{2}.

It is native to humid cloud forests and moist mixed forests between 1,300 and 2,600 meters elevation.

The species is threatened with habitat loss and deforestation across parts of its range, including illegal logging, human-caused fires, and clearing forests for cattle pasture and agriculture.

== Subspecies ==
The IUCN Red List accepts two subspecies: M. guatemalensis subsp. guatemalensis, endemic to Guatemala; and M. guatemalensis subsp. hondurensis, commonly known as the Honduran magnolia, native to El Salvador and Honduras. Both subspecies have been assessed as Vulnerable by the IUCN. Plants of the World Online treats M. guatemalensis subsp. hondurensis as a separate species, M. hondurensis.

== Cultivation ==
This species has been successfully hybridized with the southern magnolia (M. grandiflora).
