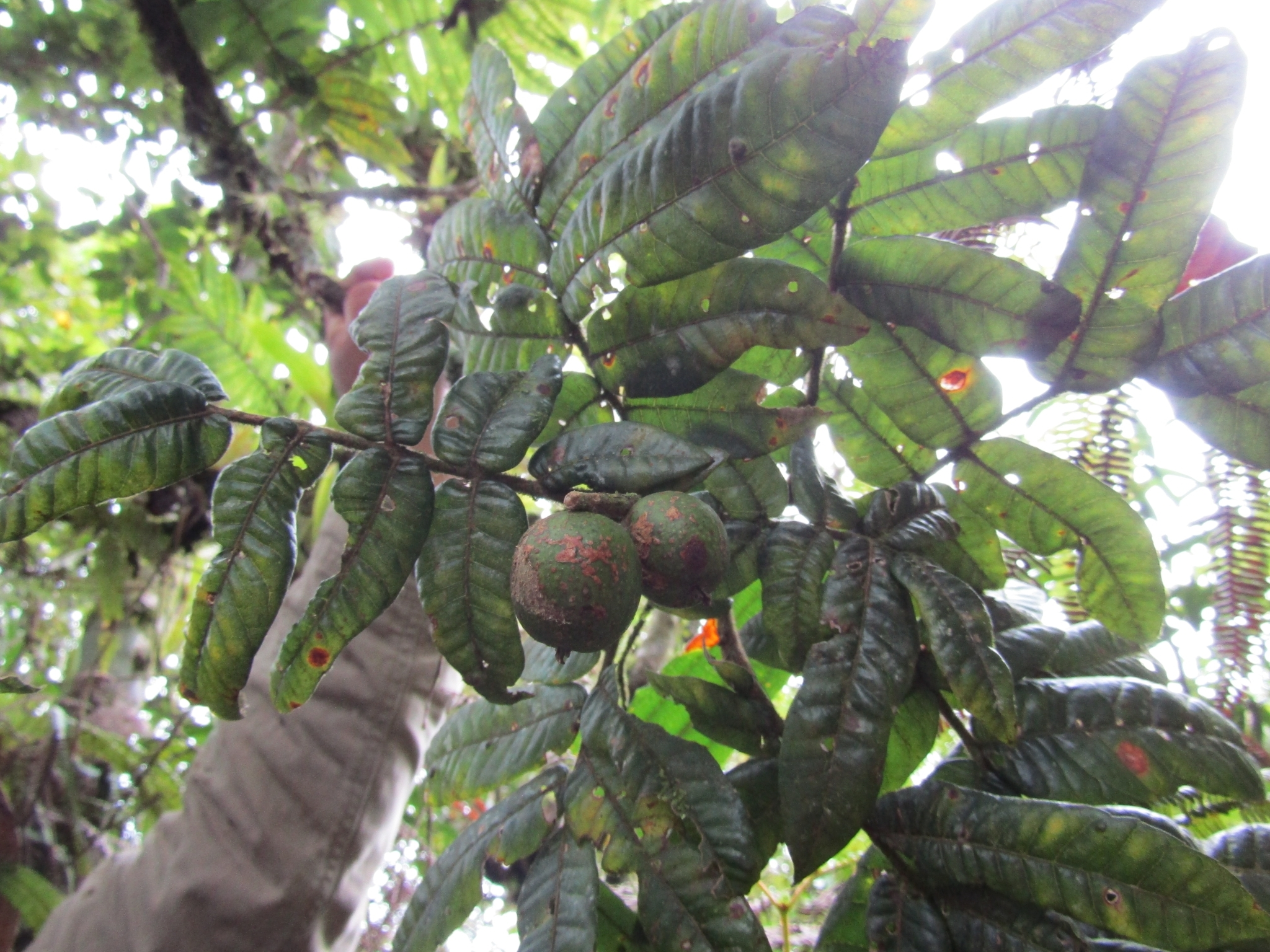

Conservation status
- Vulnerable (IUCN 2.3)

Scientific classification
- Kingdom: Plantae
- Clade: Embryophytes
- Clade: Tracheophytes
- Clade: Angiosperms
- Clade: Eudicots
- Clade: Rosids
- Order: Fagales
- Family: Juglandaceae
- Genus: Alfaroa
- Species: A. hondurensis

Binomial name
- Alfaroa hondurensis L.O. Williams ex W.E.Manning

= Alfaroa hondurensis =

Species of flowering plant

Alfaroa hondurensis is a species of flowering plant in the Juglandaceae family. It is a tree native to El Salvador and Honduras.
