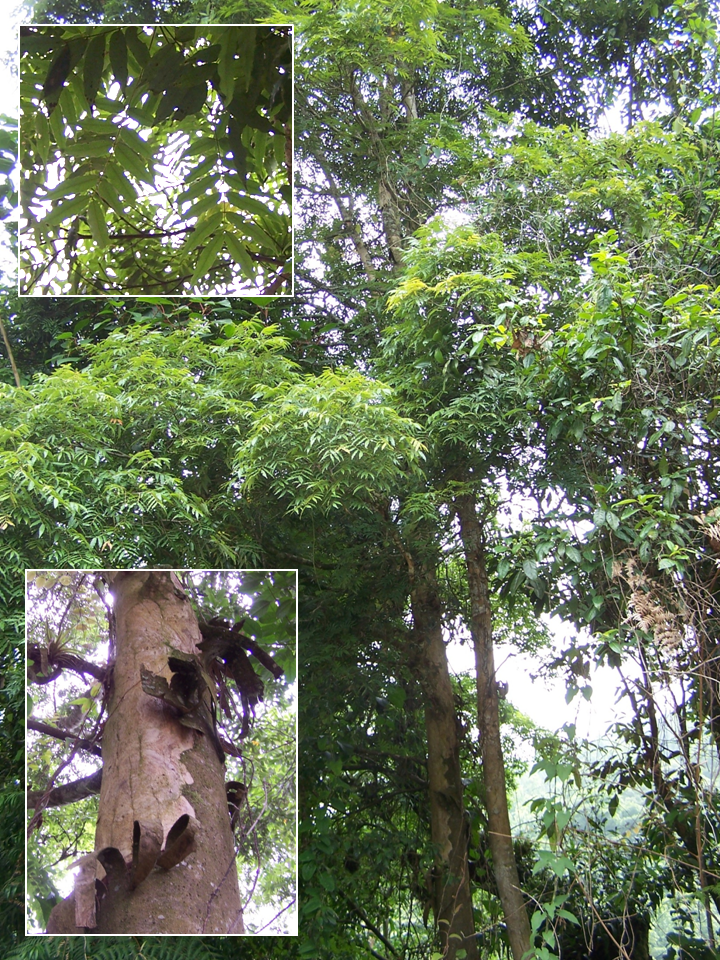
- Oreomunnea mexicana

Scientific classification
- Kingdom: Plantae
- Clade: Embryophytes
- Clade: Tracheophytes
- Clade: Angiosperms
- Clade: Eudicots
- Clade: Rosids
- Order: Fagales
- Family: Juglandaceae
- Subfamily: Engelhardioideae
- Genus: Oreomunnea; Oerst.

Species
- 4; see text

Synonyms
- Oreamunoa Oerst.

= Oreomunnea =

Genus of flowering plants

Oreomunnea is a genus of four species of flowering plants in the family Juglandaceae. Species are native to southern Mexico, Central America, and Colombia, where they occur in montane rainforest.

They are large trees growing to 35 m tall, with pinnate leaves with four to eight leaflets; unlike most genera in the Juglandaceae, the leaves are arranged in opposite pairs. The fruit is a small nut about 1 cm diameter, with a three-lobed wing.

== Species ==
Four species are accepted:

- Oreomunnea americana Lundell
- Oreomunnea mexicana (Standl.) J.-F.Leroy
- Oreomunnea munchiquensis Lozano & F.González
- Oreomunnea pterocarpa Oerst.
