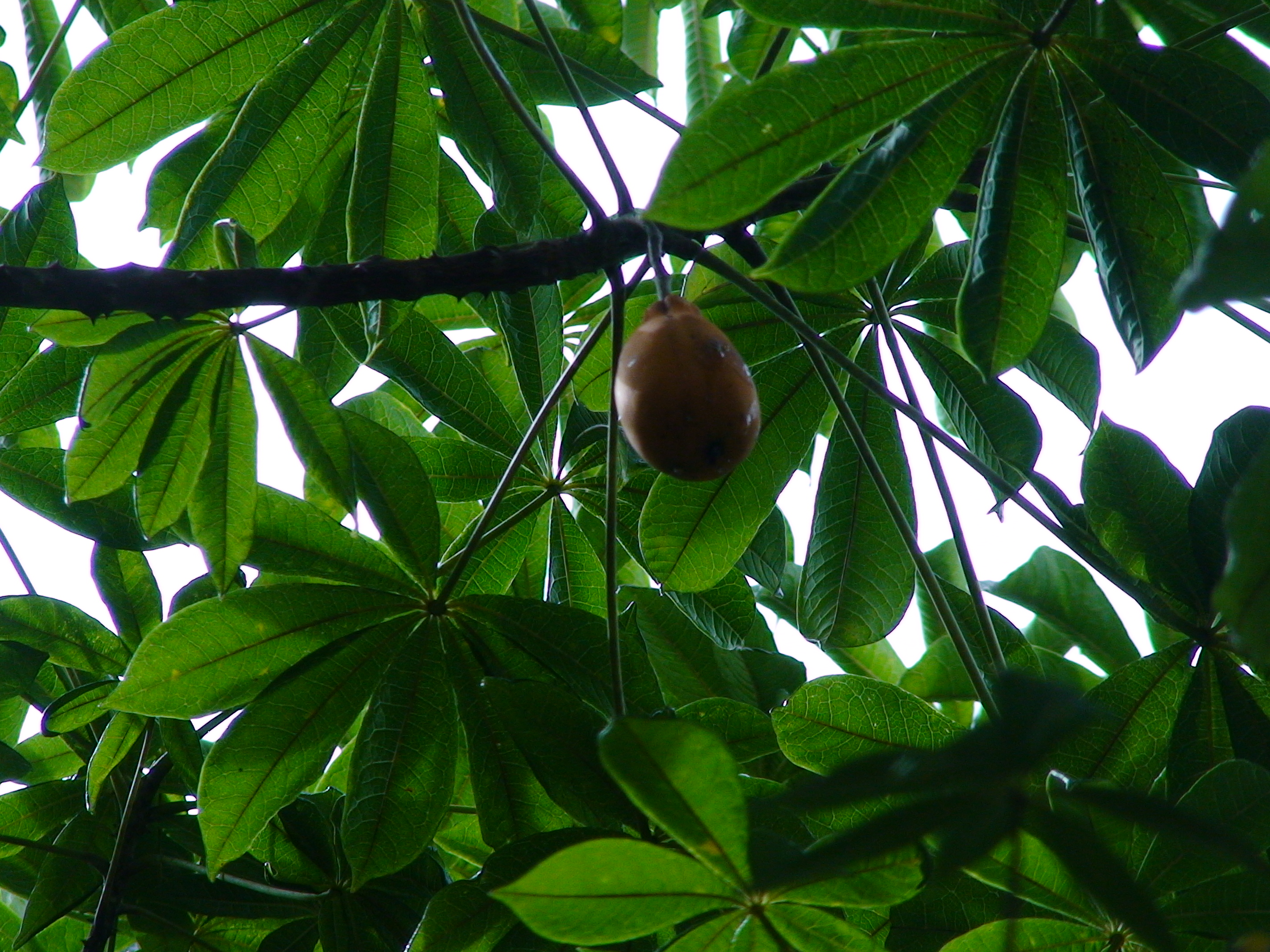
- Jacaratia spinosa

Scientific classification
- Kingdom: Plantae
- Clade: Tracheophytes
- Clade: Angiosperms
- Clade: Eudicots
- Clade: Rosids
- Order: Brassicales
- Family: Caricaceae
- Genus: Jacaratia; A.DC.

Type species
- Jacaratia spinosa (Aubl.) A.DC.

Species
- See text

= Jacaratia =

Genus of flowering plants

Jacaratia is a genus of shrubs or trees in the family Caricaceae. They are native to South and Central America.

Some species of the genus are edible to humans and served in restaurants as a delicacy.

== Species ==
The following species are recognized:

- Jacaratia chocoensis A.H.Gentry & Forero
- Jacaratia corumbensis Kuntze
- Jacaratia digitata (Poepp. & Endl.) Solms
- Jacaratia dolichaula (Donn.Sm.) Woodson
- Jacaratia heptaphylla (Vell.) A.DC.
- Jacaratia mexicana A.DC.
- Jacaratia spinosa (Aubl.) A.DC.
