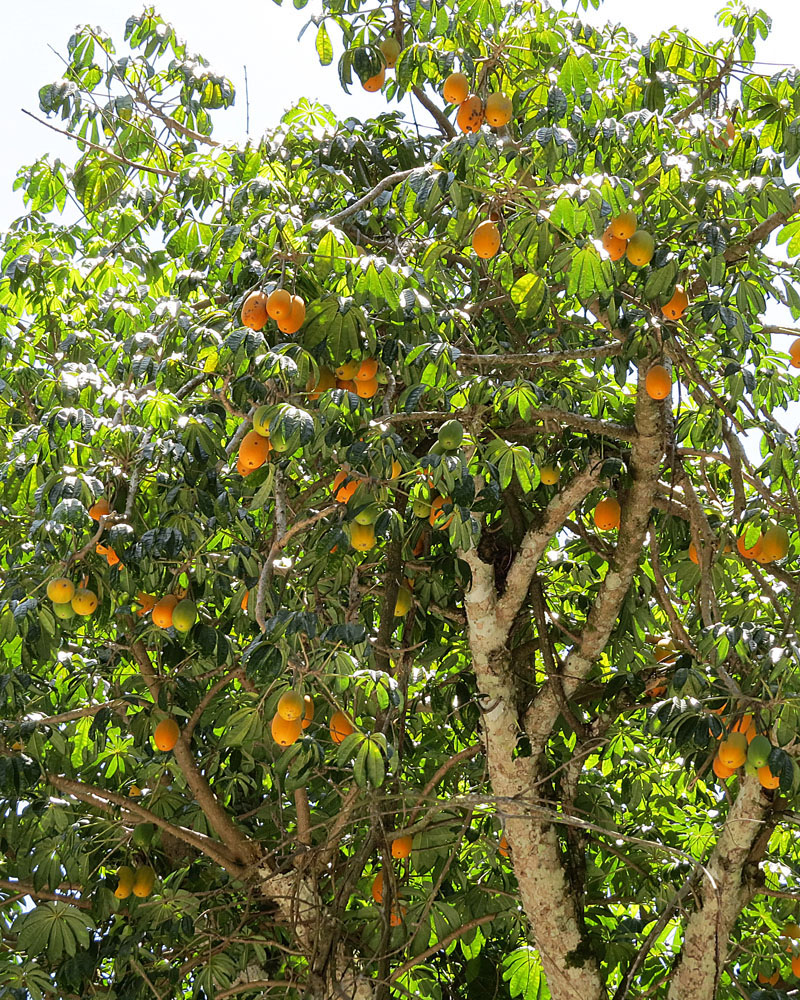

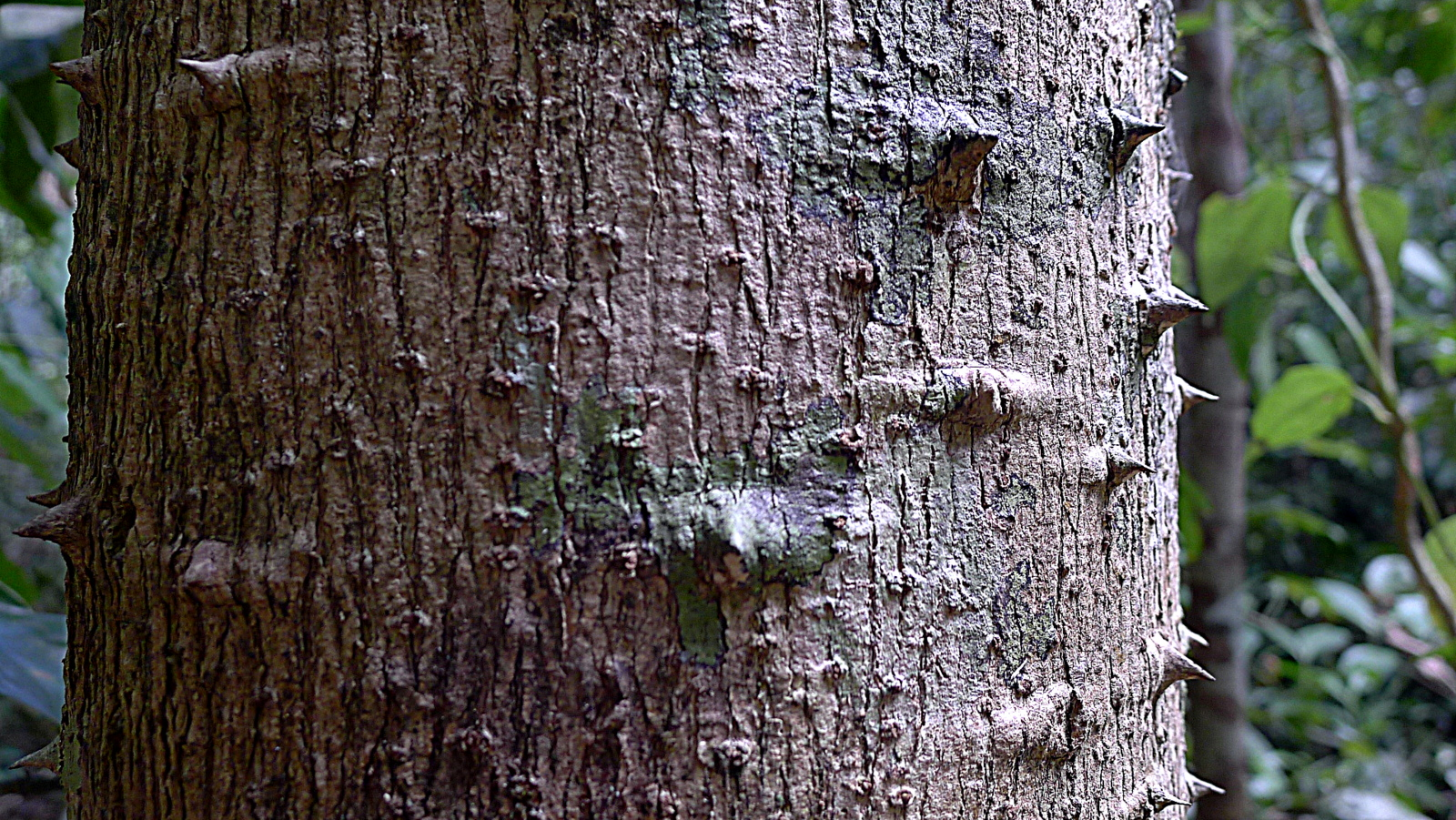
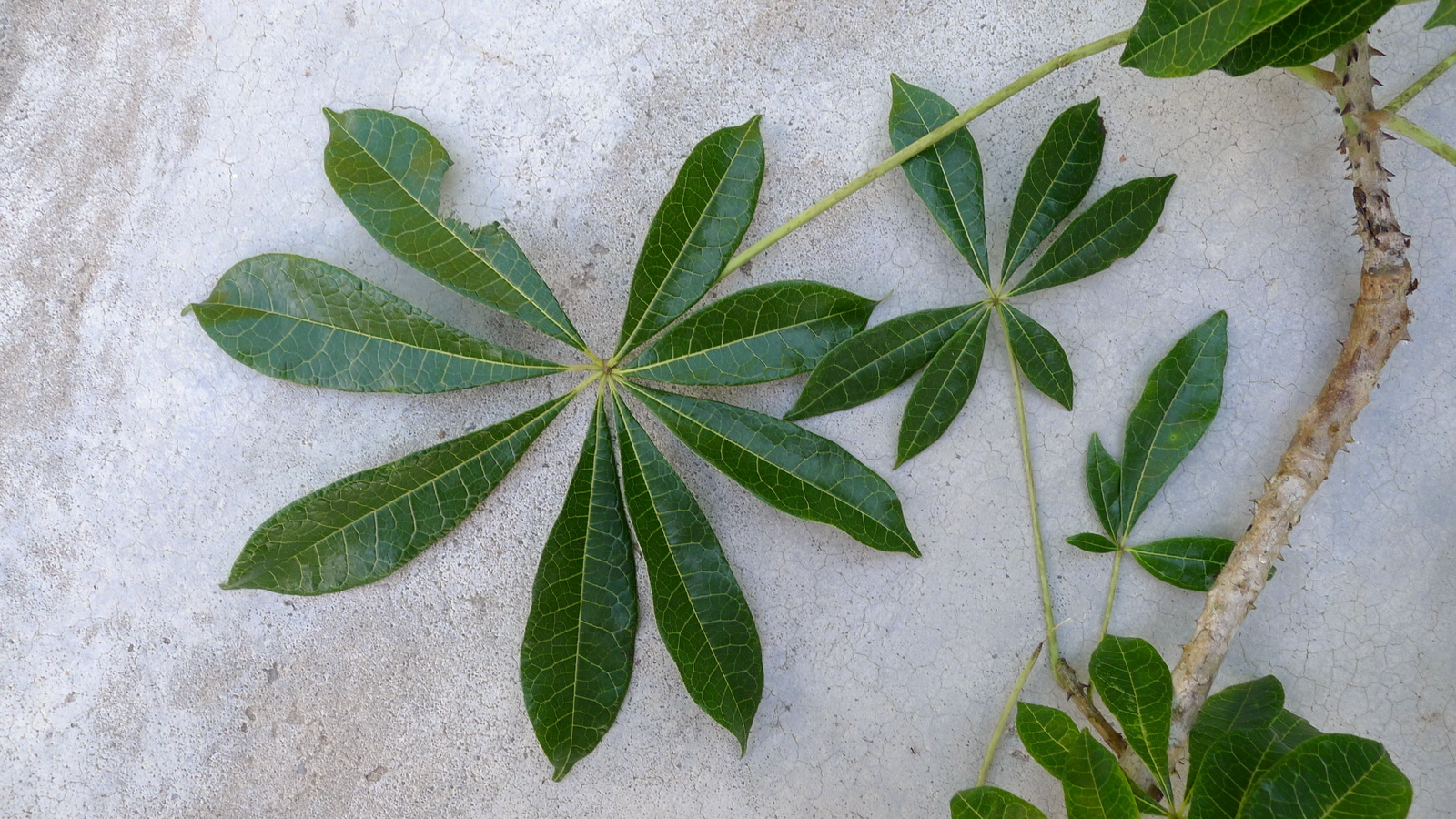
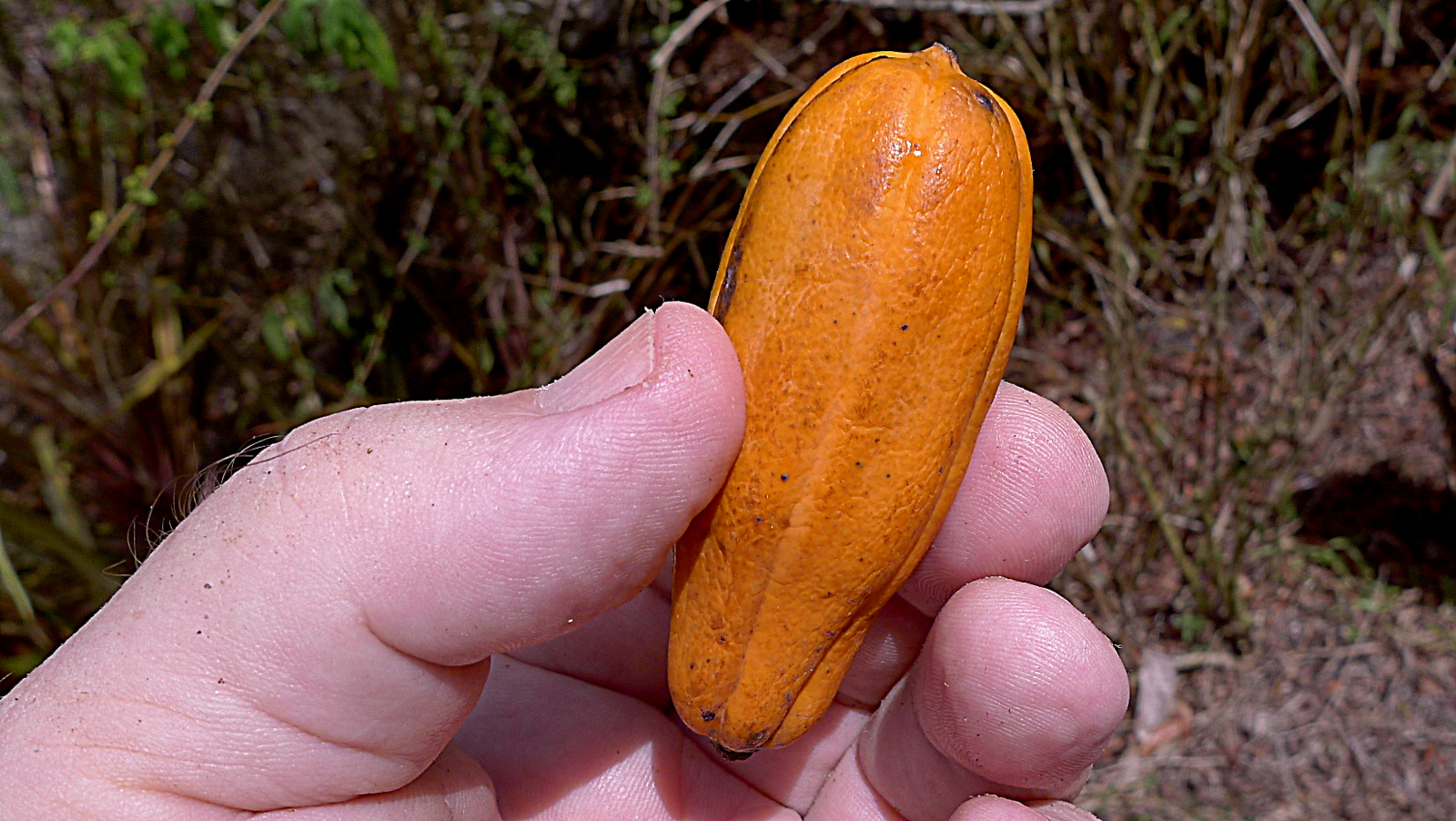
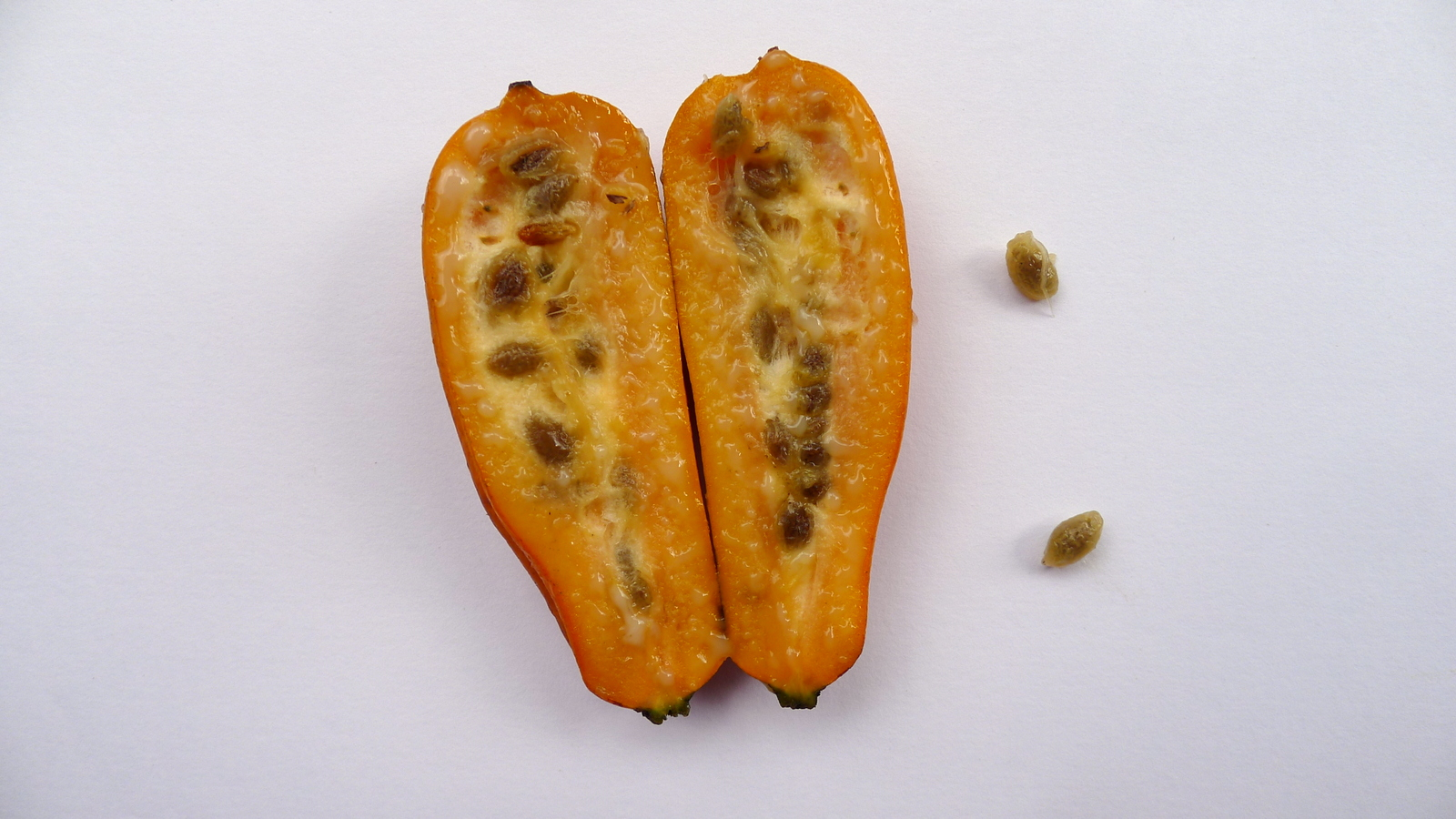
- Bark Leaf Fruit Seeds

Scientific classification
- Kingdom: Plantae
- Clade: Tracheophytes
- Clade: Angiosperms
- Clade: Eudicots
- Clade: Rosids
- Order: Brassicales
- Family: Caricaceae
- Genus: Jacaratia
- Species: J. spinosa

Binomial name
- Jacaratia spinosa (Aubl.) A. DC.

= Jacaratia spinosa =

Species of tree

Jacaratia spinosa (known as wild mango, or mamoeiro-bravo and mamãozinho in Brazil, and yacaratiá tree in Argentina) is a species of tree, in the genus Jacaratia of the family Caricaceae (the papaya family). It is found in the tropical dry forests of central and southern Mexico, Nicaragua, and El Salvador. Its stem is used as a main ingredient in the manufacturing of candy. Its fruit is also appreciated by many animals including monkeys and birds.

== Description ==
It is a deciduous tree with an open and narrow crown and can grow up to 15 meters (50 feet) tall. It is armed with conical spines that are short and stout.

== Ecology ==
The fruit of the yacaratiá tree is eaten by a variety of animals including lowland tapirs, brown howler monkeys, white-lipped peccaries, collared peccaries, white-eared opossums, Argentine black and white tegus, southern muriqui, humans, and birds.

== As food ==
The fruit of this tree are edible raw or cooked. Although if eaten raw, the skin must be scored for some time in order to release a copious latex.

=== Edible wood ===
The wood of the yacaratiá tree is served as a delicacy in Argentinian restaurants. The wood is soaked in honey or syrup and is also available in chocolate bonbons or in flavored jams with sawdust. The wood is soft and fibrous and the taste has been compared to chestnuts.

Although most wood is indigestible to humans due to the high lignin content, the yacaratiá tree is only around 10% cellulose while the rest is mostly water with very little lignin content. Unlike most plants, cells of this tree contain large spaces within their walls which store water.

== Agroforestry ==
The yacaratiá tree makes a good pioneer species due to its fast growth.

== Links ==
- Jacaratia spinosa - Useful Tropical Plants
- Jacaratia spinosa (Aubl.) A. DC. - Encyclopedia of Life
- Jacaratia spinosa (Aubl.) A. DC. - Catalogue of Life
