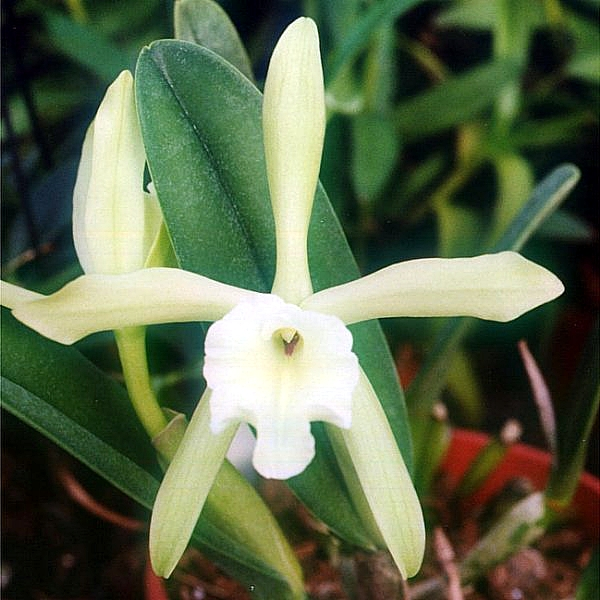
- Rhyncholaelia glauca

Scientific classification
- Kingdom: Plantae
- Clade: Tracheophytes
- Clade: Angiosperms
- Clade: Monocots
- Order: Asparagales
- Family: Orchidaceae
- Subfamily: Epidendroideae
- Tribe: Epidendreae
- Subtribe: Laeliinae
- Genus: Rhyncholaelia; Schltr.

Species
- Rhyncholaelia digbyana; Rhyncholaelia glauca

= Rhyncholaelia =

Genus of orchids

Rhyncholaelia, abbreviated Rl. in the horticultural trade, is a genus of orchids (family Orchidaceae), comprising two species. They are distributed in Mexico, Guatemala, Belize, and Honduras. Both species were originally published in Brassavola by Lindley. In 1918, Schlechter erected the new genus Rhyncholaelia and moved Brassavola digbyana Lindl. 1846 and Brassavola glauca Lindl. 1839 into it.

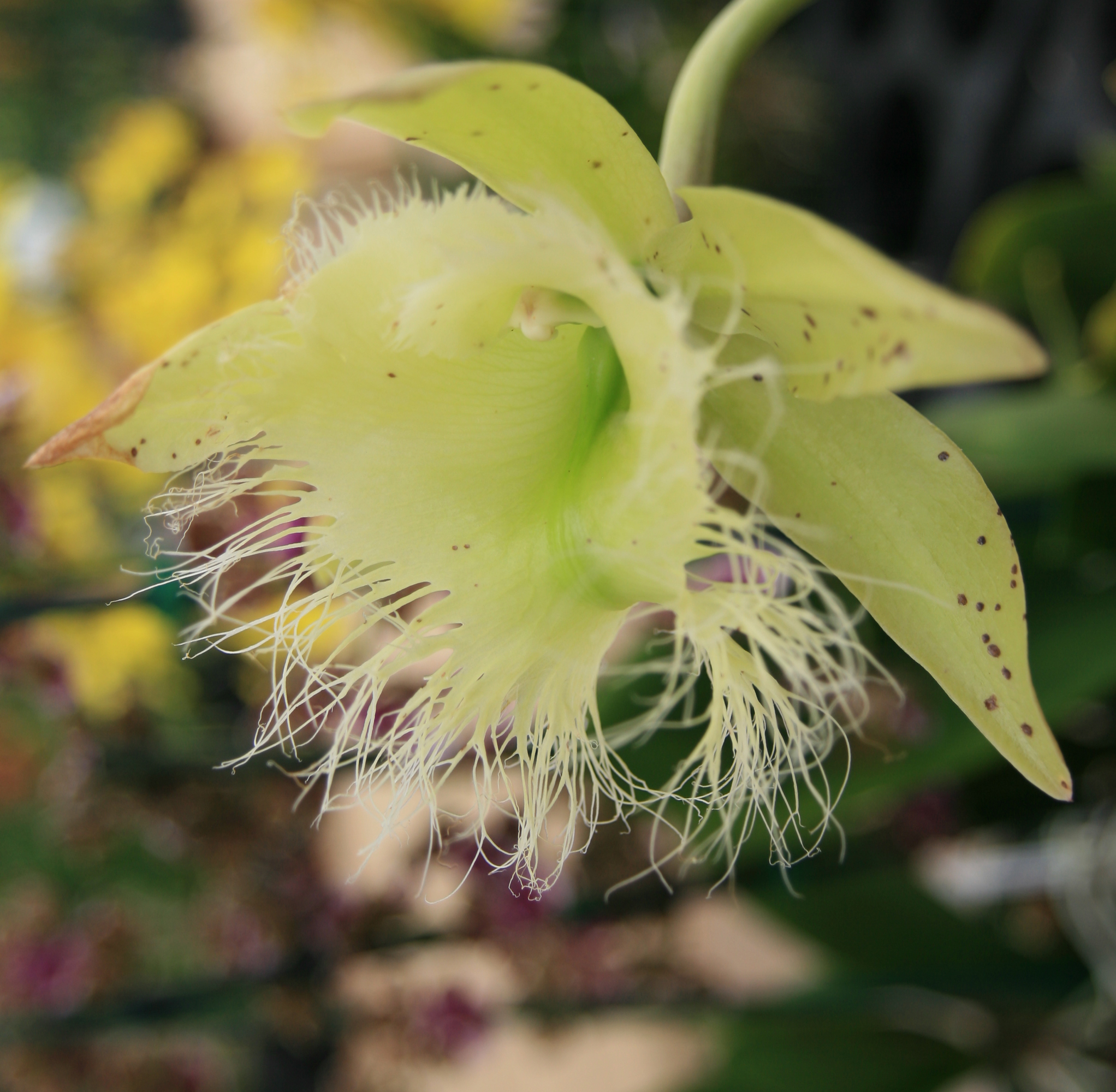
Rhyncholaelia digbyana is the national flower of Honduras

== Species ==
- Rhyncholaelia digbyana (Lindl.) Schltr.
- Rhyncholaelia glauca (Lindl.) Schltr.

== Hybrids ==
- Rl. Aristocrat (= Rl. glauca × Rl. digbyana), registered by M. Roccaforte (1973) as Brassavola Aristocrat
- Rl. Memoria Coach Blackmore (= Rl. digbyana × Rl. Aristocrat), registered by S. Blackmore (2003)
