= Chrysoglossa fumosa =

Scientific classification
- Kingdom: Animalia
- Phylum: Arthropoda
- Clade: Pancrustacea
- Class: Insecta
- Order: Lepidoptera
- Superfamily: Noctuoidea
- Family: Notodontidae
- Genus: Chrysoglossa
- Species: C. fumosa

Binomial name
- Chrysoglossa fumosa Miller, 2008

Species of moth

Chrysoglossa fumosa is a moth of the family Notodontidae first described by James S. Miller in 2008. The length of the forewings is 18 mm for males. The forewing is olive to dark brown with some faint maculations above, with the underside being slightly paler and spotless. The hindwing is pale or grayish-brown. It is currently documented only from Panama, but its range probably also includes southern Costa Rica.

== Taxonomy ==
Chrysoglossa fumosa was first studied by Warren, who in 1905 called it an aberration belonging to the species C. maxima and gave it the name fumosa. This name was subsequently treated as a synonym of maxima until the American entomologist James S. Miller recognized it as a distinct species. Chrysoglossa fumosa was formally described by Miller in 2008 based on a male collected from Chiriquí in Panama. The specific epithet is derived from the Latin word meaning "full of smoke", alluding to the smoky-brown color of the moth's wings. C. fumosa is most closely related to an undescribed species from Costa Rica.

== Description ==
The length of the forewings is 18 mm for males. The forewing is olive to dark brown with some faint maculations above, with the underside being slightly paler and spotless. The hindwing is pale or grayish-brown.

== Distribution and habitat ==
Chrysoglossa fumosa is currently documented only from Panama, but its range probably also includes southern Costa Rica.
