= Magnolia hondurensis =

Conservation status
- Vulnerable (IUCN 3.1)

Scientific classification
- Kingdom: Plantae
- Clade: Embryophytes
- Clade: Tracheophytes
- Clade: Spermatophytes
- Clade: Angiosperms
- Clade: Magnoliids
- Order: Magnoliales
- Family: Magnoliaceae
- Genus: Magnolia
- Species: M. hondurensis

Binomial name
- Magnolia hondurensis A.M.Molina

Synonyms
- Magnolia guatemalensis subsp. hondurensis (A.M.Molina) A.Vázquez

Species of flowering plant

Magnolia hondurensis is a species of flowering plant in the family Magnoliaceae. It is a tree native to Guatemala, Honduras, and El Salvador. It grows in montane cloud forest and moist mixed forest from 1,800 to 2,300 meters elevation.
