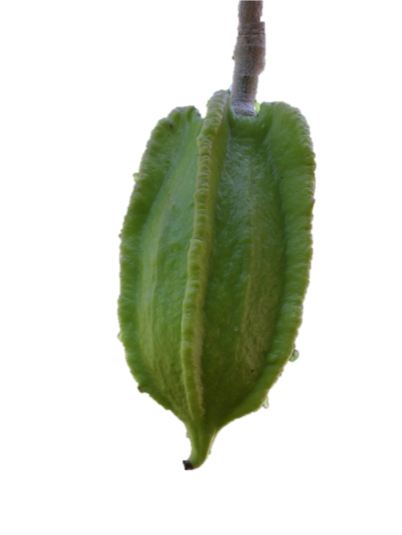

Scientific classification
- Kingdom: Plantae
- Clade: Tracheophytes
- Clade: Angiosperms
- Clade: Eudicots
- Clade: Rosids
- Order: Brassicales
- Family: Caricaceae
- Genus: Jacaratia
- Species: J. mexicana

Binomial name
- Jacaratia mexicana A.DC.

= Jacaratia mexicana =

Species of tree

Jacaratia mexicana (also known as bonete or K'uun che) is a species of tree, in the genus Jacaratia of the family Caricaceae. it is found in the tropical dry forests of central and southern Mexico, Nicaragua, and El Salvador.
