= Myrospermum frutescens =

Scientific classification
- Kingdom: Plantae
- Clade: Tracheophytes
- Clade: Angiosperms
- Clade: Eudicots
- Clade: Rosids
- Order: Fabales
- Family: Fabaceae
- Subfamily: Faboideae
- Genus: Myrospermum
- Species: M. frutescens

Binomial name
- Myrospermum frutescens Jacq. (1760)

Synonyms
- Calusia emarginata Bertero ex Steud. (1841); Myrospermum emarginatum Klotzsch (1857); Myrospermum frutescens var. emarginatum (Klotzsch) M.Gómez (1894); Myrospermum secundum Klotzsch (1857); Myroxylon frutescens (Jacq.) Willd. (1799); Toluifera frutescens (Jacq.) H.Karst. (1886)

Species of legume

Myrospermum frutescens, the cercipo, is a species of flowering plant in the legume family, Fabaceae. It ranges from central Mexico through Central America to Colombia and Venezuela.

== Habitat ==
It is a tree of continental tropical America distributed from Mexico to Colombia, Venezuela and Trinidad. It is native to lowlands and mid-elevations, in humid or very humid forests of the American tropics, often found in semi-arid conditions. A very adaptable plant, it can tolerate average daily temperatures up to 35 °C and an average annual rainfall of 500 to 1500 mm. It requires a sunny position, succeeding in a variety of soils. In Venezuela it is frequent in the warm coastal areas and in the dry forests of Los Llanos. It acquires greater dimensions in the northeastern region of the country, particularly in the states of Anzoátegui and Sucre, at altitudes higher than 800 m above sea level.
