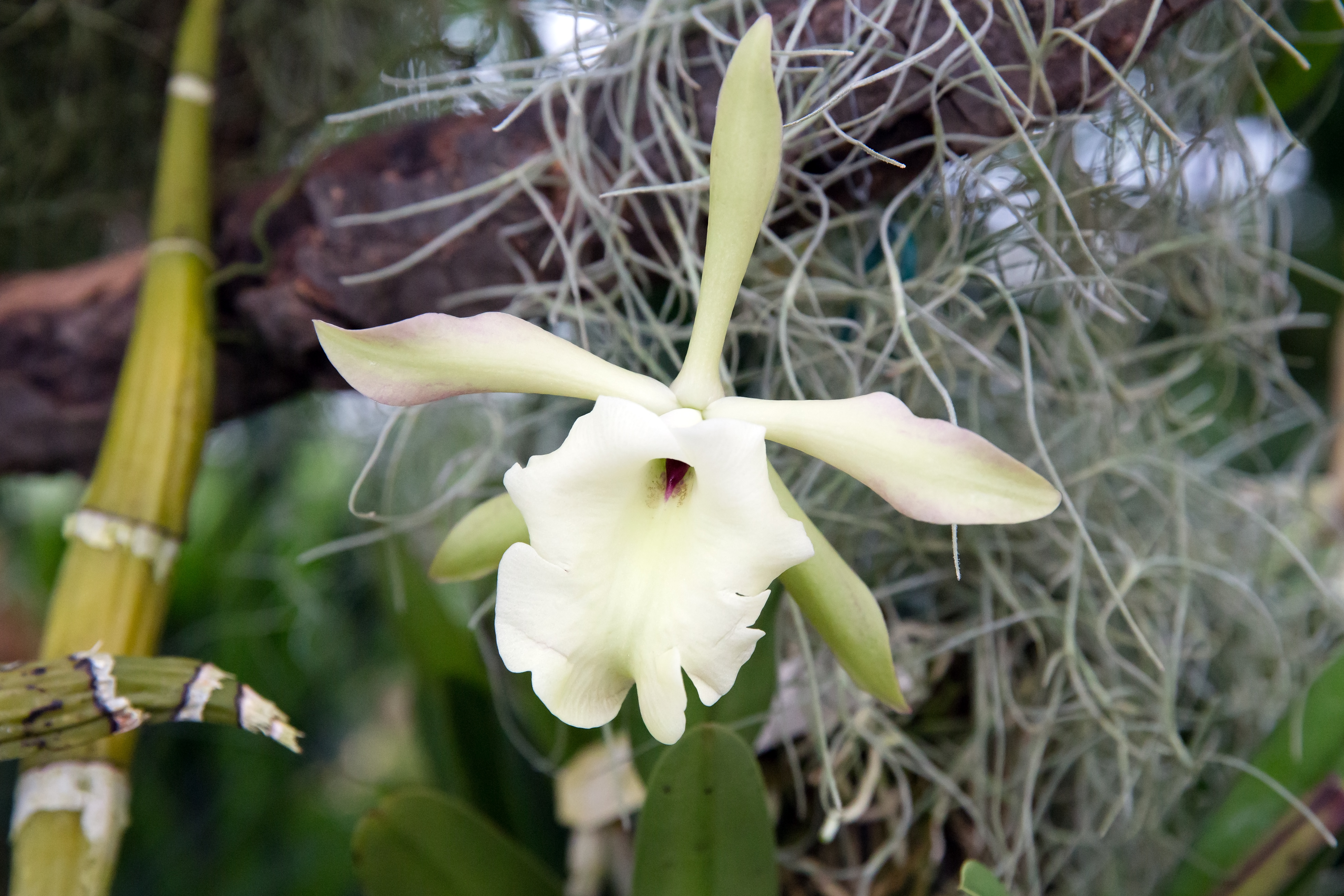
- Rhyncholaelia glauca flower

Scientific classification
- Kingdom: Plantae
- Clade: Tracheophytes
- Clade: Angiosperms
- Clade: Monocots
- Order: Asparagales
- Family: Orchidaceae
- Subfamily: Epidendroideae
- Genus: Rhyncholaelia
- Species: R. glauca

Binomial name
- Rhyncholaelia glauca (Lindl.) Schltr. (1918)

Synonyms
- Bletia glauca Lindl. (Rchb.f, 1862); Brassavola glauca Lindl. (1839); Laelia glauca Lindl. (Bth., 1880)

= Rhyncholaelia glauca =

Species of orchid

Rhyncholaelia glauca is a species of orchid occurring from Mexico to Belize, Guatemala and southeastern Honduras.
