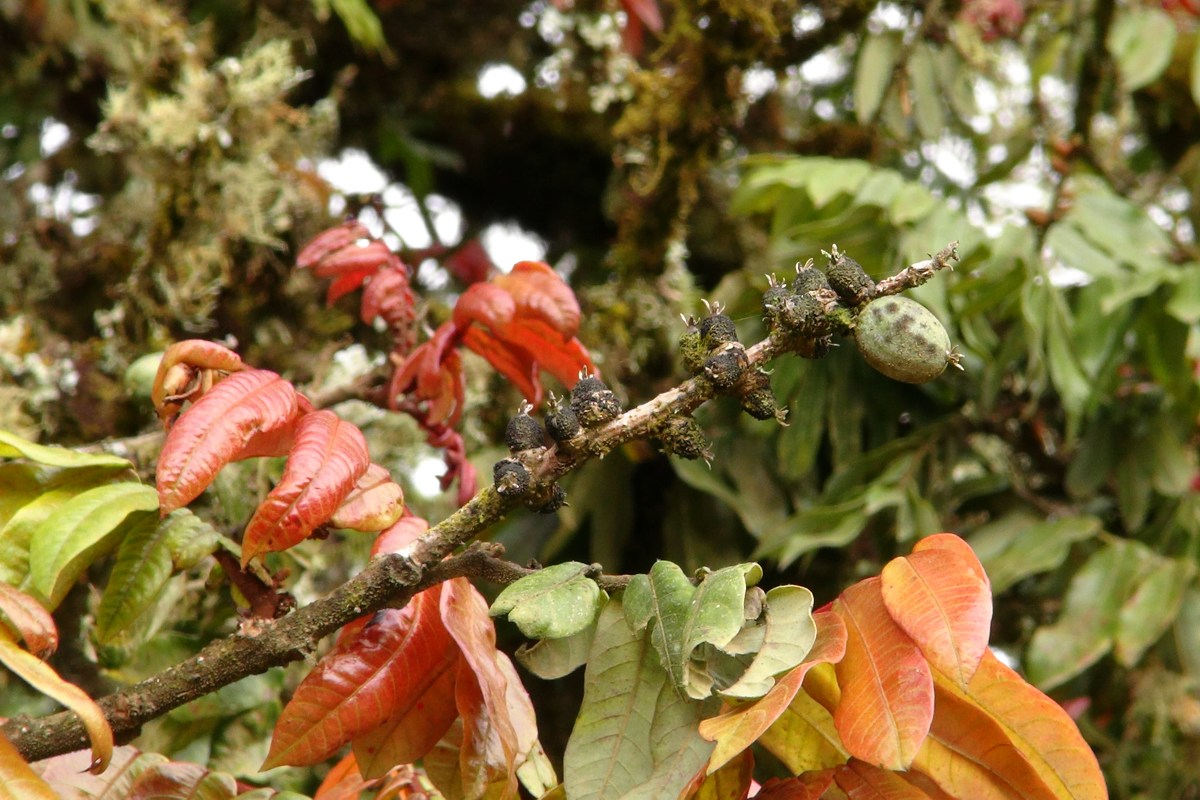
- Fruits and leaves of Alfaroa costaricensis. Costa Rica, northern Cordillera de Talamanca, Savegre valley near San Gerardo de Rivas, ca. 2300 m.

Scientific classification
- Kingdom: Plantae
- Clade: Embryophytes
- Clade: Tracheophytes
- Clade: Angiosperms
- Clade: Eudicots
- Clade: Rosids
- Order: Fagales
- Family: Juglandaceae
- Subfamily: Engelhardioideae
- Genus: Alfaroa; Standl.

= Alfaroa =

Genus of flowering plants

Alfaroa is a genus of evergreen trees in the Juglandaceae family of the Fagales, growing in montane and submontane tropical rain forests in Mexico, Central America, and Colombia. The wood is characterized by solid pith, pink heartwood, and vessels with scalariform perforations, as well as simple perforations.

== Description ==
The (usually pinnately compound) leaves are evergreen and lack stipules. They are alternate, rarely opposite.

The plants are monoecious, the male flowers being in lateral panicles (several pairs of catkins on an inflorescence) and the female flowers born terminally either in a single spike or in a hermaphroditic panicle including several paired male catkins. Each flower has a wide bract, two bracteoles, and four sepals. The flowers are sessile. The male flowers have a round or oblong receptacle and six to ten stamens. The pollen grains are approximately 24 micrometers in diameter and are slightly triangular in polar view.

The small fruits are nuts, one-chambered at the apex and eight-chambered (sometimes four-chambered) at the base. Germination is hypogeal.

== Species ==
Alfaroa includes the following species:

- Alfaroa costaricensis Standl. —Campano Chile, Chiciscua, Gaulin, Gavilancillo
- Alfaroa guanacastensis D.E.Stone
- Alfaroa guatemalensis (Standl.) L.O.Williams & Ant.Molina
- Alfaroa hondurensis L.O.Williams
- Alfaroa manningii J.León
- Alfaroa mexicana D.E.Stone
- Alfaroa williamsii Ant.Modina

A. guatemalensis was originally described as belonging to the genus Engelhardia.
