= Chrysoglossa maxima =

Scientific classification
- Kingdom: Animalia
- Phylum: Arthropoda
- Clade: Pancrustacea
- Class: Insecta
- Order: Lepidoptera
- Superfamily: Noctuoidea
- Family: Notodontidae
- Genus: Chrysoglossa
- Species: C. maxima

Binomial name
- Chrysoglossa maxima (H. Druce, 1897)

Synonyms
- Polypoetes maximus H. Druce, 1897

Species of moth

Chrysoglossa maxima is a moth of the family Notodontidae first described by Herbert Druce in 1897. It is found in Panama, Costa Rica and Guatemala.

Chrysoglossa maxima is one of the largest species in the subfamily Dioptinae. The forewings of females are 26 mm long, with males being slightly shorter.
