= Chrysoglossa phaethon =

Scientific classification
- Kingdom: Animalia
- Phylum: Arthropoda
- Clade: Pancrustacea
- Class: Insecta
- Order: Lepidoptera
- Superfamily: Noctuoidea
- Family: Notodontidae
- Genus: Chrysoglossa
- Species: C. phaethon

Binomial name
- Chrysoglossa phaethon (Schaus, 1912)

Synonyms
- Tithraustes phaethon Schaus, 1912

Species of moth

Chrysoglossa phaethon is a moth of the family Notodontidae first described by William Schaus in 1912. It is found in Costa Rica.
