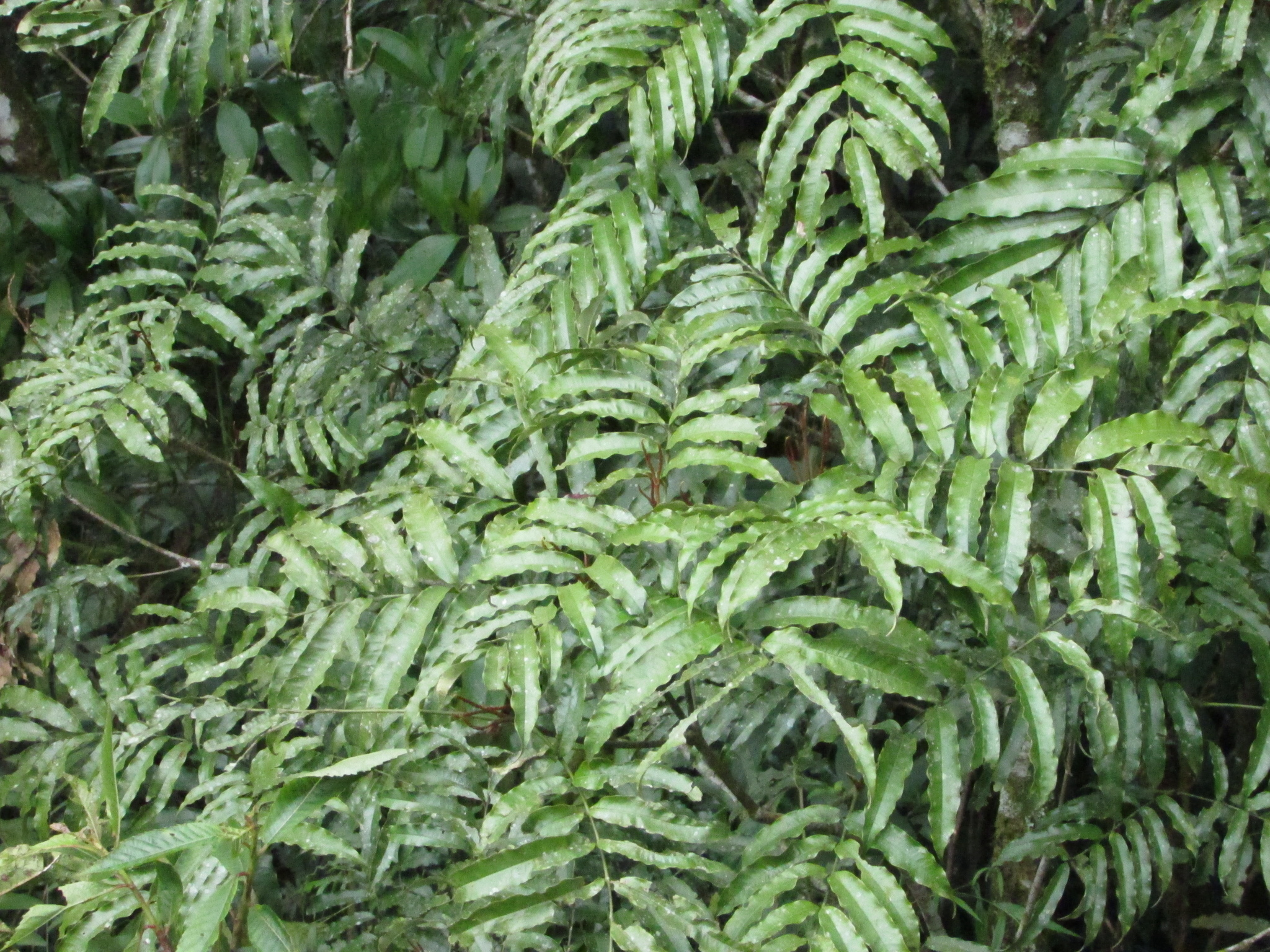

Conservation status
- Endangered (IUCN 3.1)

Scientific classification
- Kingdom: Plantae
- Clade: Embryophytes
- Clade: Tracheophytes
- Clade: Angiosperms
- Clade: Eudicots
- Clade: Rosids
- Order: Fagales
- Family: Juglandaceae
- Genus: Alfaroa
- Species: A. mexicana

Binomial name
- Alfaroa mexicana D.E.Stone

= Alfaroa mexicana =

Species of tree

Alfaroa mexicana is a species of flowering plant in the family Juglandaceae. It is a tree native to Guatemala and southern and central Mexico.
