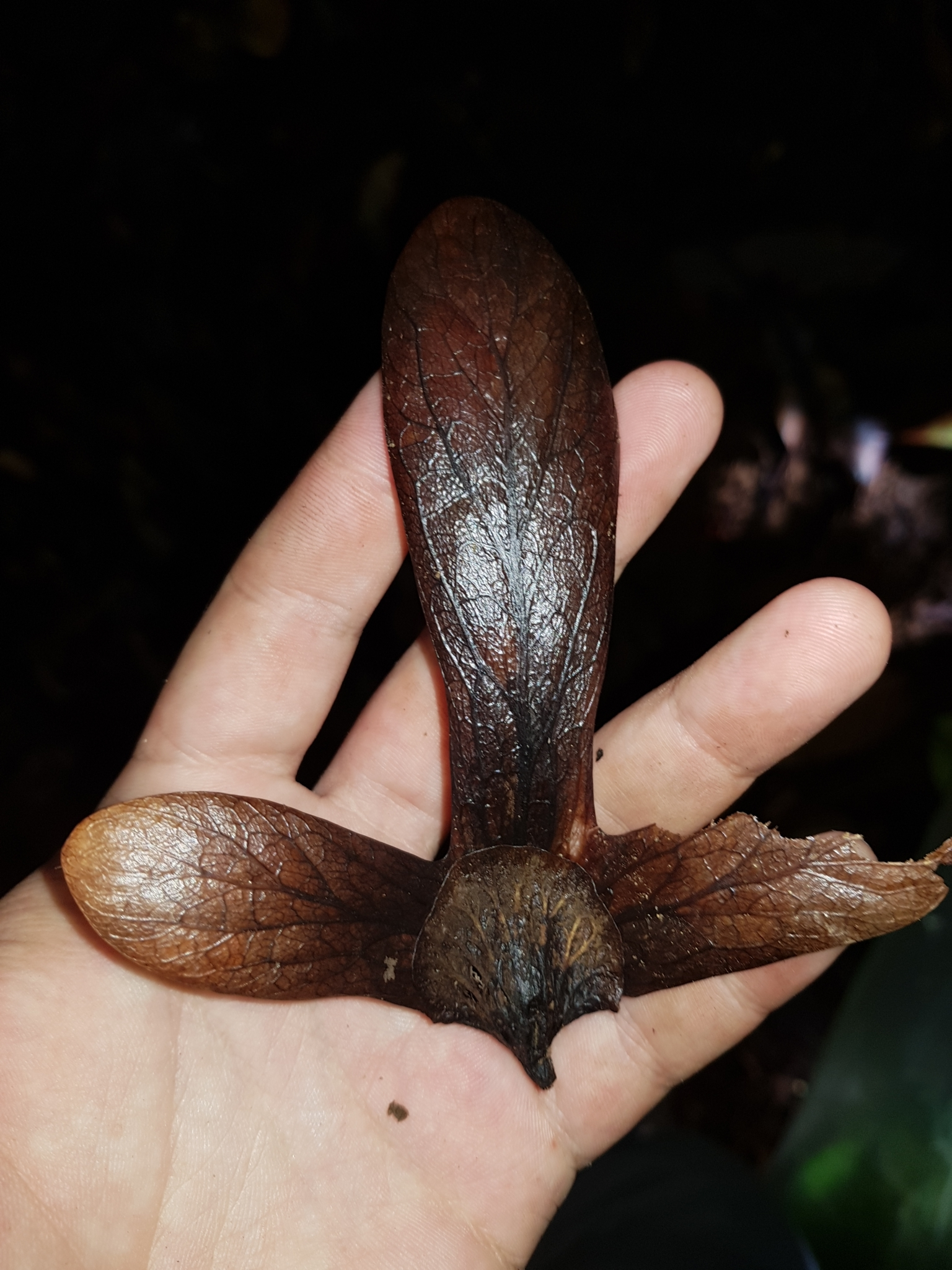
- O. pterocarpa in Puntarenas, Costa Rica

Conservation status
- Near Threatened (IUCN 3.1)

Scientific classification
- Kingdom: Plantae
- Clade: Embryophytes
- Clade: Tracheophytes
- Clade: Angiosperms
- Clade: Eudicots
- Clade: Rosids
- Order: Fagales
- Family: Juglandaceae
- Genus: Oreomunnea
- Species: O. pterocarpa

Binomial name
- Oreomunnea pterocarpa Oerst.

= Oreomunnea pterocarpa =

Species of flowering plant

Oreomunnea pterocarpa, known locally as gavilán or gavilán blanco, is a species of Oreomunnea in the family Juglandaceae. It is found in Costa Rica and Panama (Coclé Province).

It is a large tree growing to 35 m tall with a trunk up to 80 cm diameter. The leaves are pinnate, with four to eight leaflets each 6–20 cm long; unlike most genera in the Juglandaceae, the leaves are arranged in opposite pairs. The fruit is a small nut about 1 cm diameter, with a three-lobed wing, and a small fourth lobe at the base.
