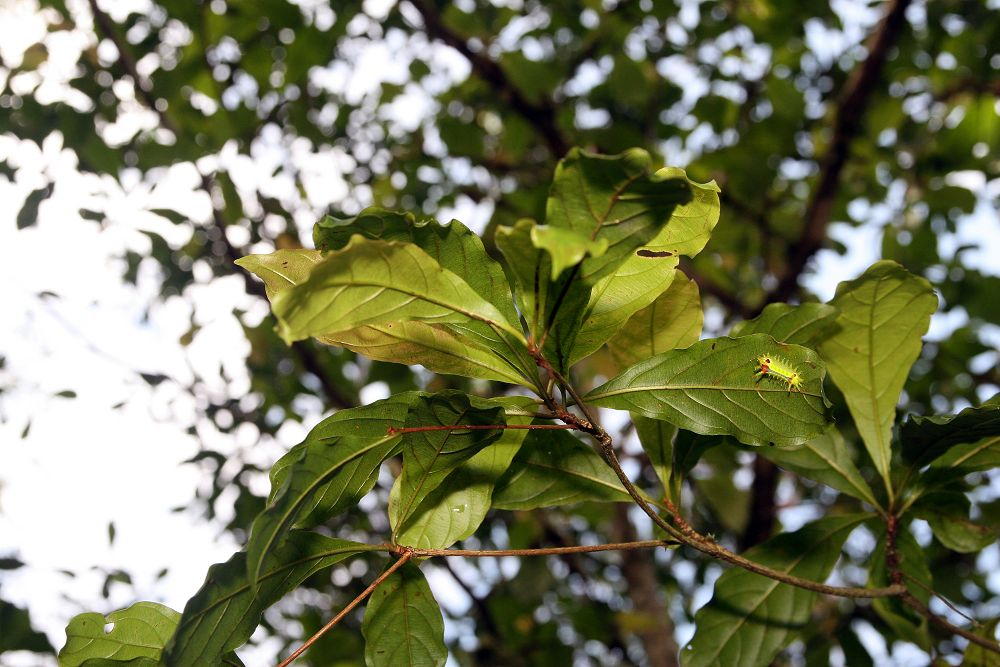
- Leaves of Terminalia amazonia

Conservation status
- Least Concern (IUCN 3.1)

Scientific classification
- Kingdom: Plantae
- Clade: Tracheophytes
- Clade: Angiosperms
- Clade: Eudicots
- Clade: Rosids
- Order: Myrtales
- Family: Combretaceae
- Genus: Terminalia
- Species: T. amazonia

Binomial name
- Terminalia amazonia (J.F.Gmel.) Exell

Synonyms
- Chuncoa amazonia J.F.Gmel.; Chuncoa obovata Poir.; Gimbernatia amazonia Ruiz & Pav.; Myrobalanus obovatus (Ruiz & Pav.) Kuntze; Terminalia odontoptera Van Heurck & Müll. Arg.; Terminalia ovata Steud.

= Terminalia amazonia =

Species of tree

Terminalia amazonia is a species of tree in the Combretaceae family. It is native to North America and South America and has been used for commercial logging. The wood is hard and durable. In Belize, Terminalia amazonia is widely located in the Mountain Pine Ridge.

== Description ==
This species can grow up to 70m in height. It can reach a diameter of 1 to 3m. The bark is straight. At the beginning, the branches grow horizontally and the apex assumes a vertical position. The bark is thin (1 cm thick) and is grayish brown or yellow with a bitter taste. The leaves are small, dark green and glossy above and light green and opaque below.

== Vernacular names ==
Terminalia amazonia has different names in different countries. In Central America and Panama, it is known as roble coral, amarillón, canùx, naranjo, volador, amarillo real, guayabo de charco. In Mexico, it is referred as sombrerete and tepesuchil. In Cuba, the common names are guyo and chicharrón. In Belize it is referred as nargusta or bullywood. Arispin and acietuno are the common names for Venezuela. Lastly, in Colombia the common names for Terminalia amazonia are guayabo león and palo prieto.

== Ecology ==
Terminalia amazonia is a tropical tree of humid evergreen forest. It blooms between February and April while the fruit ripens between March and May.

== Wood characteristics ==
The young part of the green wood is light grayish yellow and orange or yellowish when dry. The heart is a little darker and when dry, it acquires a reddish yellow color. There are an approximate average of 2 rings per cm.

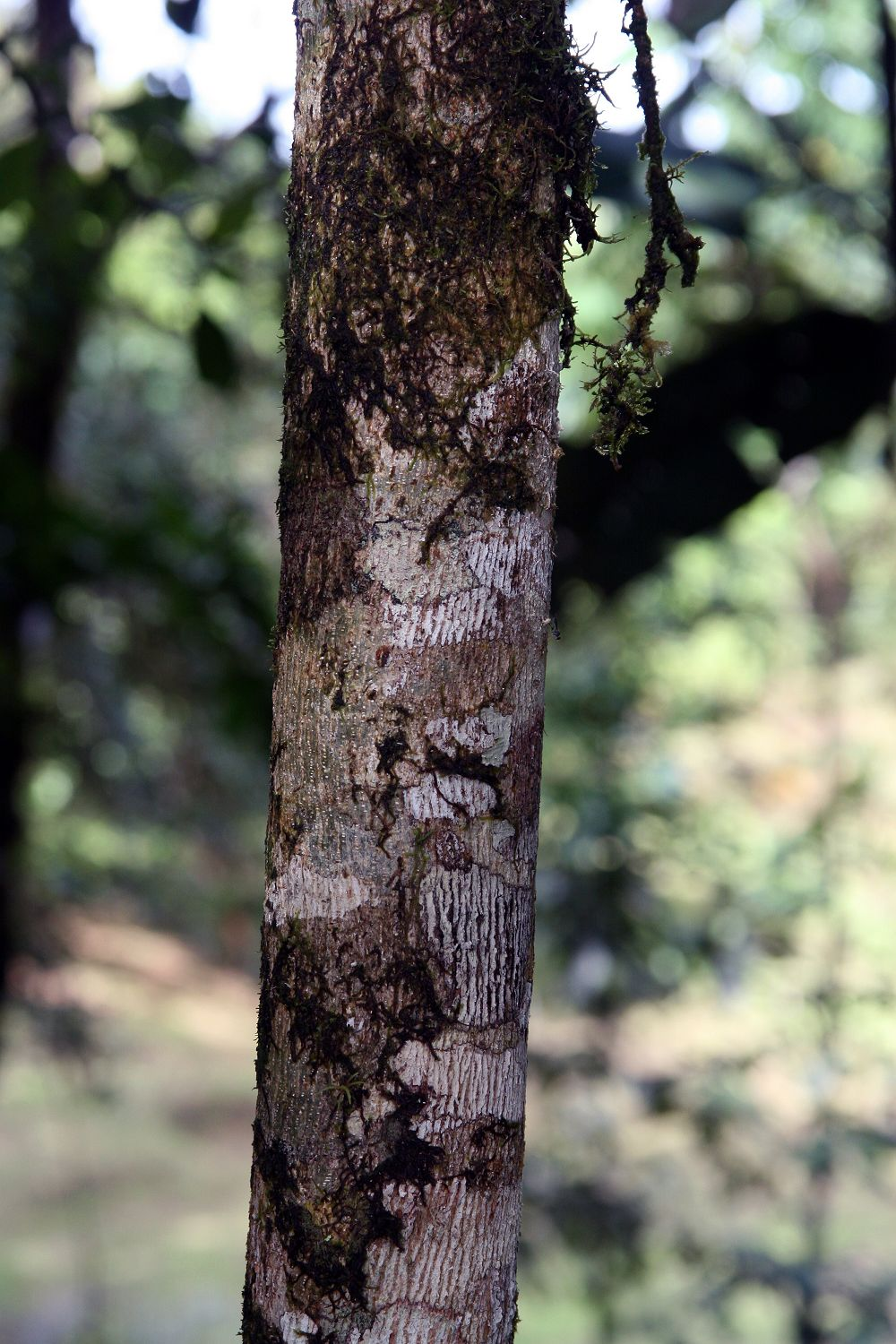
Bark of ''Terminalia amazonia''.

== Uses ==
Because of the wood of Terminalia amazonia is hard and durable, it is used in general woodwork as well as in floors.

== Propagation ==
Seed trees should be located in stands and have a diameter of at least 40 to 70 cm. The fruit must be ripe since seeds of unripe fruit does not germinate. Once the seeds are harvested, they should be transported with cloth bags and allowed to dry in the sun for two days of three to four hours. Seeds are orthodox and should be kept in airtight containers or 4 °C with moisture content of 6 to 8%.

== Pests and diseases ==
Some Terminalia amazonia plants present problems of pests during the early stages of development. The attack causes large deformation reducing the quality of the wood. It is common to encounter the problem of "gumming" caused by a virus which causes weakening of the tree until it dies.
