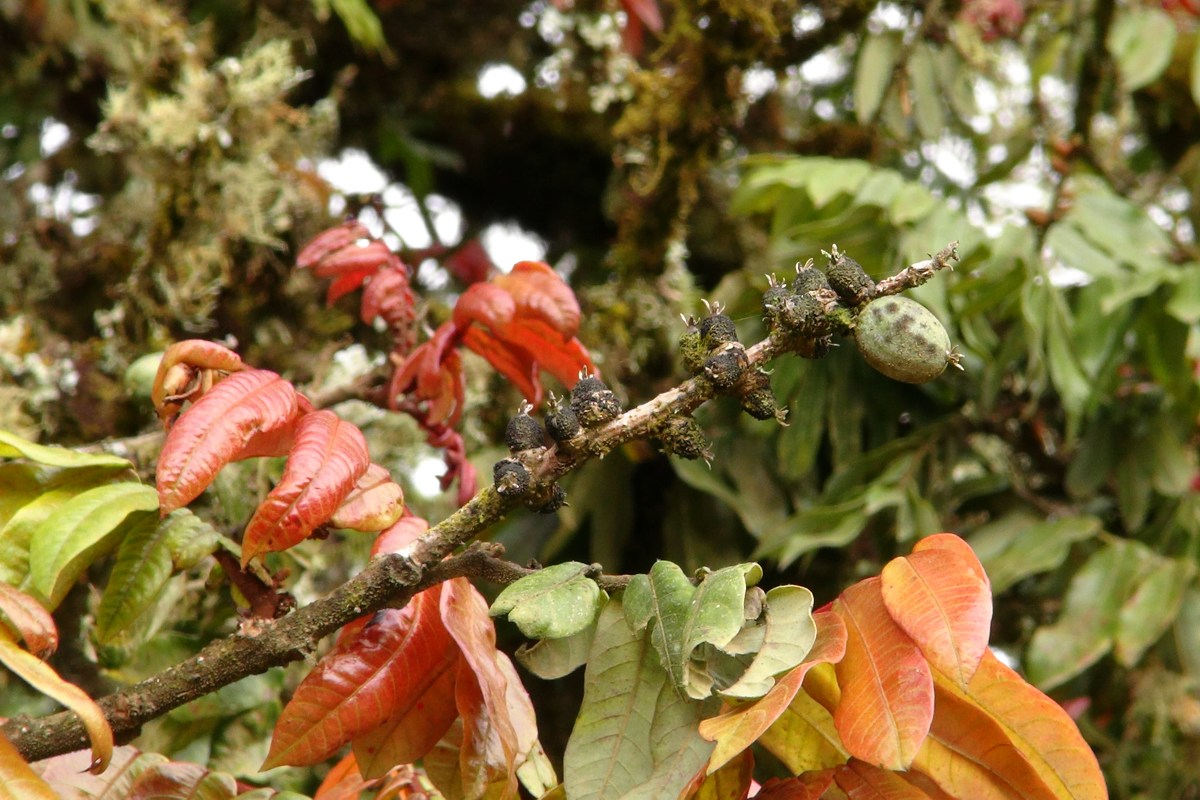

Conservation status
- Least Concern (IUCN 3.1)

Scientific classification
- Kingdom: Plantae
- Clade: Embryophytes
- Clade: Tracheophytes
- Clade: Angiosperms
- Clade: Eudicots
- Clade: Rosids
- Order: Fagales
- Family: Juglandaceae
- Genus: Alfaroa
- Species: A. costaricensis

Binomial name
- Alfaroa costaricensis Standl.

Subspecies
- Alfaroa costaricensis subsp. costaricensis; Alfaroa costaricensis subsp. septentrionalis D.E.Stone

= Alfaroa costaricensis =

Species of tree

Alfaroa costaricensis, also known as campano chile, chiciscua, gaulin, gavilán Colorado, or gavilancillo, is nut bearing timber tree in the Juglandaceae family. It is native to the Neotropics, from southern Mexico through Central America to Panama.

== Habitat ==
Alfaroa costaricensis normally grows in cloudy areas on well-drained soils with slopes of 5% or more at elevations between 600 and 2200 m which receive 1500–2500 mm of precipitation and sustain temperatures of 15 to 20 °C. This tree does not grow well in the shade.

== Description ==
Alfaroa costaricensis is a slow growing tree with pink heartwood. It can reach 27 m in height and 60 cm diameter at breast height (d.b.h.).

The seed is a nut, one-chambered at the apex and eight-chambered at the base, which measures 1.6 to 2.5 cm long and 1.4 to 1.6 cm in diameter, and is protected by a hard, thick, brown pericarp. Germination is hypogeal. The leaves are pinnately compound, and are distinguishable from other species by their heavy pubescence. The male inflorescences is a panicle, consisting of approximately ten catkins arranged alternately. The female flowers are sessile on a catkin.

== Uses ==
=== Timber ===
Alfaroa costaricensis wood is attractive but difficult to saw and finish. It is used for furniture, posts, building lumber, and the production of charcoal.

=== Wildlife food ===
Rodents consume many nuts.
