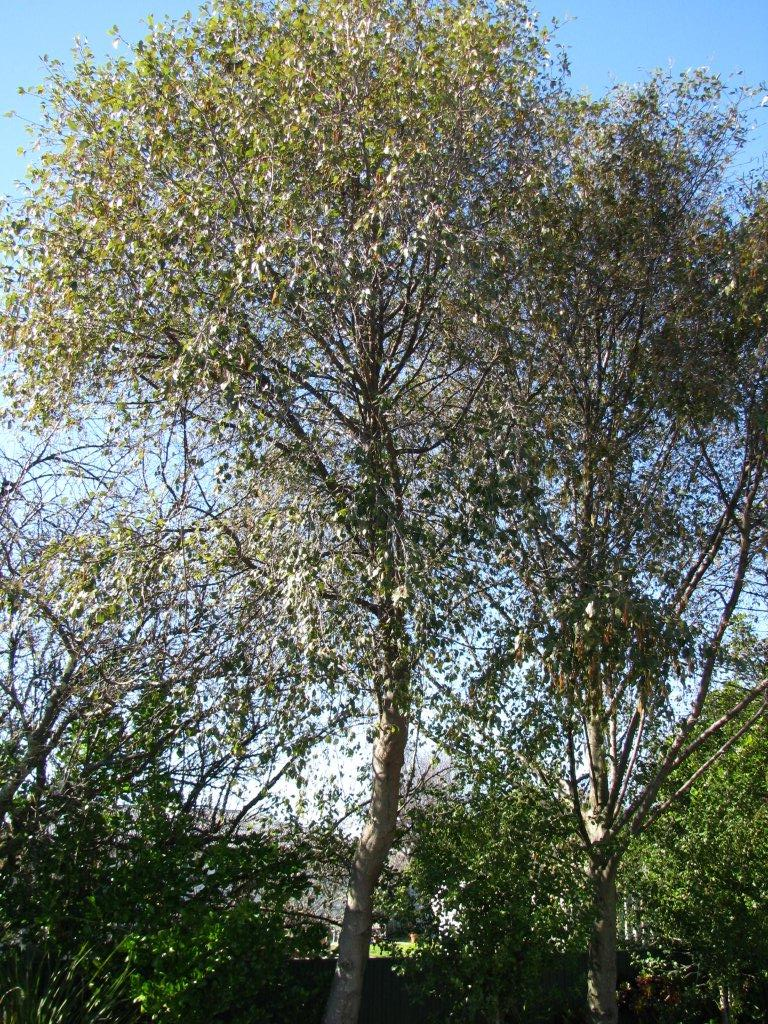

Conservation status
- Least Concern (IUCN 3.1)

Scientific classification
- Kingdom: Plantae
- Clade: Embryophytes
- Clade: Tracheophytes
- Clade: Angiosperms
- Clade: Eudicots
- Clade: Rosids
- Order: Fagales
- Family: Betulaceae
- Genus: Alnus
- Subgenus: Alnus subg. Alnus
- Species: A. jorullensis

Binomial name
- Alnus jorullensis Kunth

Synonyms
- Alnus acuminata var. jorullensis (Kunth) Regel; Alnus firmifolia Fernald

= Alnus jorullensis =

Species of tree

Alnus jorullensis, commonly known as Mexican alder or Aliso del cerro, is an evergreen or semi-evergreen alder, native to eastern and southern Mexico, Guatemala, and Honduras. Although previously reported from the Andes, further collections showed these to be the similar species A. acuminata, commonly found in South America.

== Description ==
Alnus jorullensis is a medium-sized tree growing to 20–25 m tall. The leaves are obovate to elliptic, 5–12 cm long, somewhat leathery in texture with a serrated margin and glandular on the underside. The flowers are wind-pollinated catkins, produced in early spring.

== Range and habitat ==
Alnus jorullensis grows in high-elevation forests in Mexico's Sierra Madre Occidental, Sierra Madre Oriental and Sierra Madre del Sur, and in the highlands of Honduras, from 2,800 to 3,800 meters elevation. It is the most common alder in Mexico's mountains, and grows at the highest elevations. Guatemalan populations identified as A. jorullensis may be A. acuminata, and its presence in Guatemala is uncertain.

It occurs most commonly on moist soils, including stream and river banks, wetlands, and moist slopes, where it establishes dense stands. It is also found in open oak–pine and fir woodlands. It is an early successional species in areas disturbed by natural processes like landslides or fires, or by human activities like logging or forest clearance for pasture.

In southern Mexico it is found in high-elevation tropical montane forests with cool temperatures with abundant rainfall.

== Subspecies ==
Two subspecies are recognized:

- Alnus jorullensis subsp. jorullensis – Mexico, Guatemala, Honduras
- Alnus jorullensis subsp. lutea Furlow – Mexico

== Cultivation ==
It is used for ornamental planting in warm temperate areas such as southern California.
