= José Antonio Molina Rosito =

Honduran botanist (1926–2012)

There are many people named Antonio Molina. See Molina for a partial list.

Antonio Molina Rositto (February 28, 1926, in Tegucigalpa – 23 September 2012), usually known as Antonio Molina, was a Honduran botanist and professor emeritus at the Zamorano Pan-American School of Agriculture. The standard author abbreviation Ant.Molina is used to indicate this person as the author when citing a botanical name.

Molina discovered over 100 species of native, Honduran flora. One in particular, an orchid named Rhyncholaelia digbyana, was declared the national flower of Honduras (Flor Nacional de Honduras) on 1969 November 26.

Peter Karl Endress named Molinadendron, a particular genus of small evergreen trees, after Molina.

He was married to Albertina de Molina, also a professor at Zamorano. She died on September 18, 2018.

== Awards & distinctions ==
- Professor emeritus at Zamorano
- Junior Chamber International and Municipality of San Pedro Sula "Fall Recital" (Recital de Otoño) honoree (2004)
- Zamorano Chapter of Gamma Sigma Delta honoree (2006)

== Publications ==
This list is incomplete.

- Molina R., A. (1975). "Enumeración de las plantas de Honduras". Ceiba. 19 (1).
