= Alfaroa guanacastensis =

Scientific classification
- Kingdom: Plantae
- Clade: Tracheophytes
- Clade: Angiosperms
- Clade: Eudicots
- Clade: Rosids
- Order: Fagales
- Family: Juglandaceae
- Genus: Alfaroa
- Species: A. guanacastensis

Binomial name
- Alfaroa guanacastensis D. E. Stone

Species of flowering plant

Alfaroa guanacastensis is a species of plant in the Juglandaceae family, first described from material found in the vicinity of Guanacaste, Costa Rica. It is known to flourish at altitudes from 2400 to 3700 feet.

The trees grow to 90 feet tall with a DBH of up to 2 feet. The lower trunk often has buttresses. The sapwood is white, and the heartwood is pink. The pith is solid.

The opposite leaves are pinnately compound, with opposite to sub-opposite leaflets.

The tree is monoecious. The staminate inflorescences are panicles consisting of several erect catkins. The pistillate inflorescence is a terminal spike, which may be separate from the staminate inflorescence, or may be part of an androgynous panicle. The staminate inflorescences have an odor compared to the gardenia.

The fruit is an oval nut, twice as long as wide, with a bitter meat. Germination is hypogeal; the first two aerial leaves are simple and opposite.
