= Orto Botanico dell'Università di Torino =

Botanical garden in Italy

Coordinates: 45°03′24″N 7°40′52″E

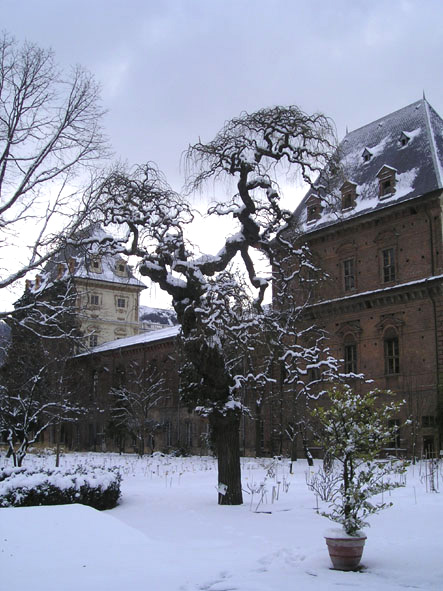
Orto Botanico dell'Università di Torino

The Orto Botanico dell'Università di Torino (2.6 hectares) is a botanical garden and arboretum operated by the Dipartimento di Biologia Vegetale of the University of Turin. It is located in the Parco del Valentino along the Po River, at Viale Pier Andrea Mattioli, Turin, Italy, and open weekends and holidays during the warmer months; an admission fee is charged.

The garden's origins can be traced as far back as 1560, when collections of live plants were established at the Studio di Mondovì, which moved to the university in 1566. Today's garden dates to 1713, when Victor Amadeus II of Sardinia established the Orto Regio. With establishment in 1729 of the university's chair in botany, held by G.B. Caccia, it legally became a part of the university.

Between 1730 and 1731 the garden was laid out in a geometric plan of flowerbeds within the Castello del Valentino's existing garden area (approximate 6800 m^{2}), within which Caccia planted about 800 species. By 1762 some 1200 species were in cultivation. In 1796 Victor Amadeus III of Sardinia donated areas west and north of the castello, bringing the garden's area to somewhat larger than its current extent. By 1810 the garden contained about 6000 cultivated plants, with an arboretum organized on its northern section (the boschetto), and the constructions of greenhouses, orangery, and herbarium. Between 1831 and 1839 further construction added more greenhouses, and in 1848 a substantial orangery.

But the subsequent century saw considerable diminution of the garden. After 1876 various greenhouses were demolished to make way for laboratories, in 1892–1893 garden space was lost to further building, and in 1929, 1969, and 1977 additional greenhouses were eliminated. The garden was extensively damaged, with loss of collections, during World War I and World War II by neglect and bombings. However, the garden is now recovering. Prof. Bruno Peyronel introduced an alpine garden in 1962–1963, in 1969 a new greenhouse was built for tropical and subtropical species, in 1986 another greenhouse added for succulent plants, and in 2006 another for South African plants.

Today the garden proper cultivates around 2000 species, with an additional 300 species in the alpine garden, about 500 species in the arboretum, and a further 1000 species in greenhouses. The garden contains the following major sections:

- Alpine garden - alpine plants, particularly the western Alps.
- Fruit trees
- Medicinal plants
- Ponds - native and exotic water plants
- South Africa greenhouse - built in 2005–2006, species from South Africa including the Tsitsikamma Mountains and Fynbos, Karoo, and Richtersveld.
- Succulent plant house (cactus house)
- Systematic beds - plants laid out according to the systematic order indicated in Flora Europaea.
- Tree-lined avenue - still includes some original trees from the early 19th century (Liriodendron tulipifera, Tilia argentea, Ginkgo biloba).
- Tropical house - primarily epiphytes, with important collections of Bromeliaceae, Orchidaceae, and Araceae.

The arboretum contains the following major areas:

- Woodlands - tree and shrub species common to the north Italian plains before agriculture
- Riverbank willows - predmoniantly Salix
- Pond - typical marsh environment of the north Italian plain
- Carex - mixture of herbaceous vegetation, predominantly Carex
- Water plants - common native species in a pond built in the first half of the 19th century
- Garden of antique fruit
- Educational trails

It also contains notable specimens of Cedrus libani, Fagus sylvatica, Ginkgo biloba, Platanus orientalis, Populus deltoides, Pseudotsuga menziesii, Pterocarya fraxinifolia, Pterocarya stenoptera, Quercus robur, Taxus baccata, and Zelkova carpinifolia.

== See also ==
- List of botanical gardens in Italy
- www.ortobotanico.unito.it
