= Eumecocera unicolor =

Scientific classification
- Domain: Eukaryota
- Kingdom: Animalia
- Phylum: Arthropoda
- Class: Insecta
- Order: Coleoptera
- Suborder: Polyphaga
- Infraorder: Cucujiformia
- Family: Cerambycidae
- Genus: Eumecocera
- Species: E. unicolor

Binomial name
- Eumecocera unicolor (Kono, 1933)

Synonyms
- Stenostola unicolor Kono, 1933; Eumecocera atrofusca Breuning, 1966

Species of beetle

Eumecocera unicolor is a species of beetle in the family Cerambycidae. It was described by Kono in 1933. It is known from Japan. It feeds on Pterocarya rhoifolia and Magnolia obovata.
