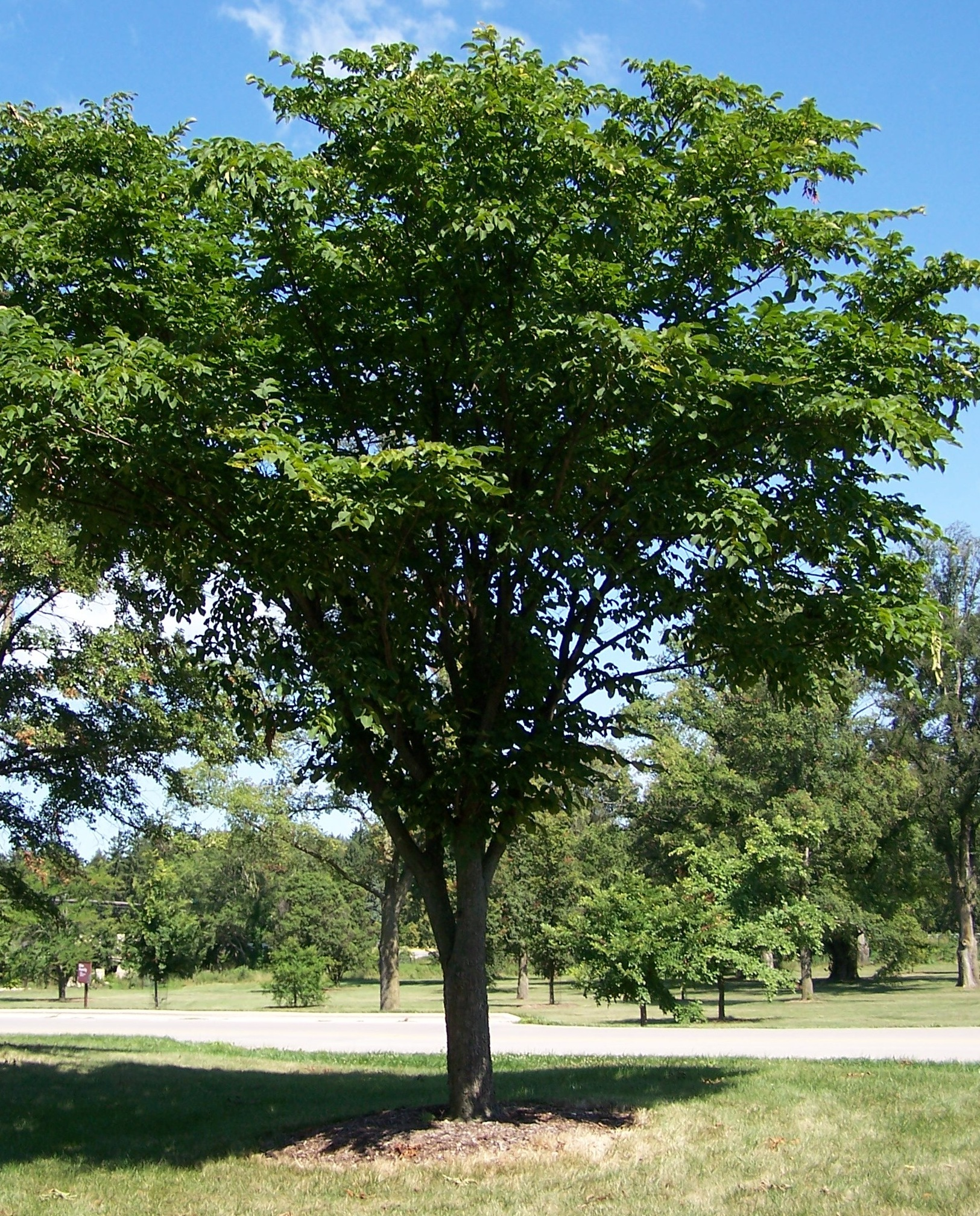
- Nikko Elm at the Morton Arboretum

Scientific classification
- Kingdom: Plantae
- Clade: Tracheophytes
- Clade: Angiosperms
- Clade: Eudicots
- Clade: Rosids
- Order: Rosales
- Family: Ulmaceae
- Genus: Ulmus
- Species: U. laciniata
- Variety: U. l. var. nikkoensis

Trinomial name
- Ulmus laciniata var. nikkoensis Rehder

= Ulmus laciniata var. nikkoensis =

Variety of tree

Ulmus laciniata var. nikkoensis Rehder, the Nikko elm, was discovered as a seedling near Lake Chūzenji, near Nikkō, Japan, and obtained by the Arnold Arboretum in 1905. The taxonomy of the tree remains a matter of contention, and has been considered possibly a hybrid of U. laciniata and U. davidiana var. japonica. However, in crossability experiments at the Arnold Arboretum in the 1970s, U. laciniata, a protogynous species, was found to be incompatible with U. davidiana var. japonica, which is protandrous.

Significantly, the variety was not recognized by Ohwi, though his reasons are not clear. Kew's 'Plants of the World Online' treats var. nikkoensis as a synonym of U. laciniata.

== Description ==
Var. nikkoensis is a small tree; the specimen at the Morton Arboretum likened to a cherry tree. The tree is chiefly distinguished by leaves which are red on emergence, and toothed but not lobed as in the species. The perfect apetalous wind-pollinated flowers appear in March in England.

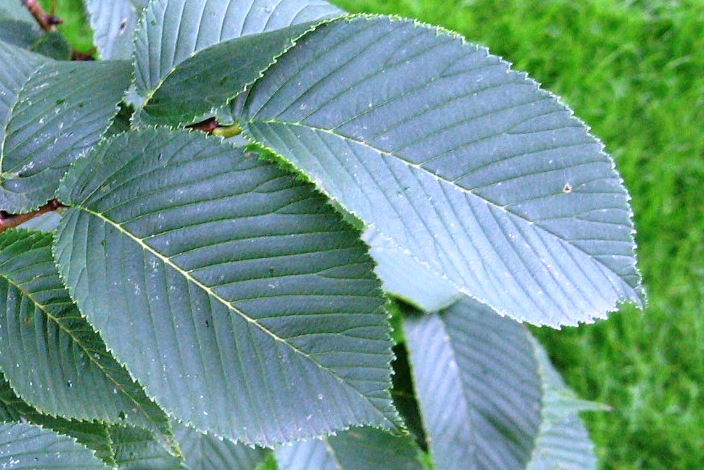
var. nikkoensis leaves, Kew

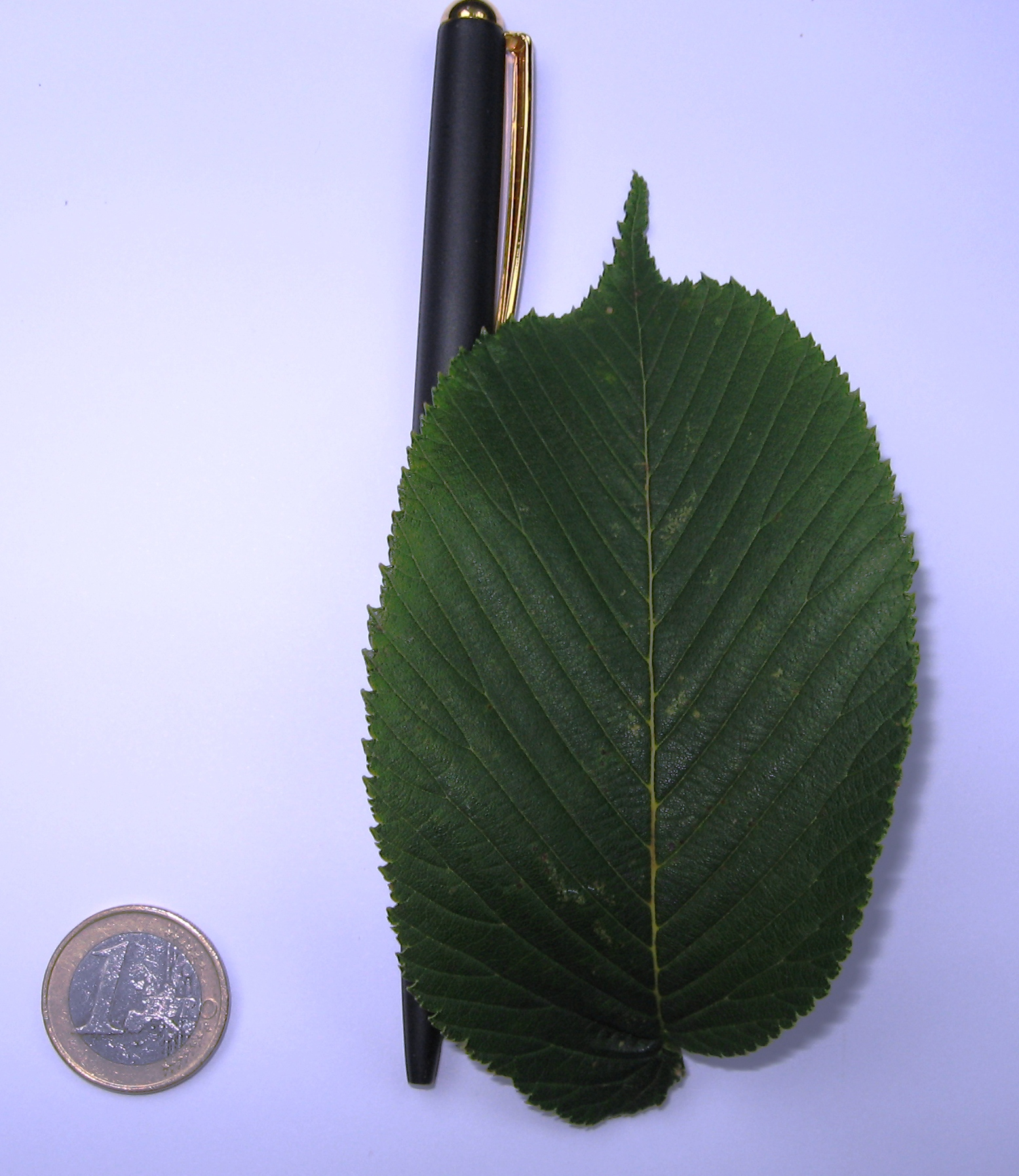
var. nikkoensis leaf and scale

== Pests and diseases ==
Heybroek found the tree provided 'relatively resistant' (to DED) progeny in the Dutch elm breeding programme.

== Cultivation ==
There are no known cultivars of this taxon, nor is it known to be in commerce beyond the United States.

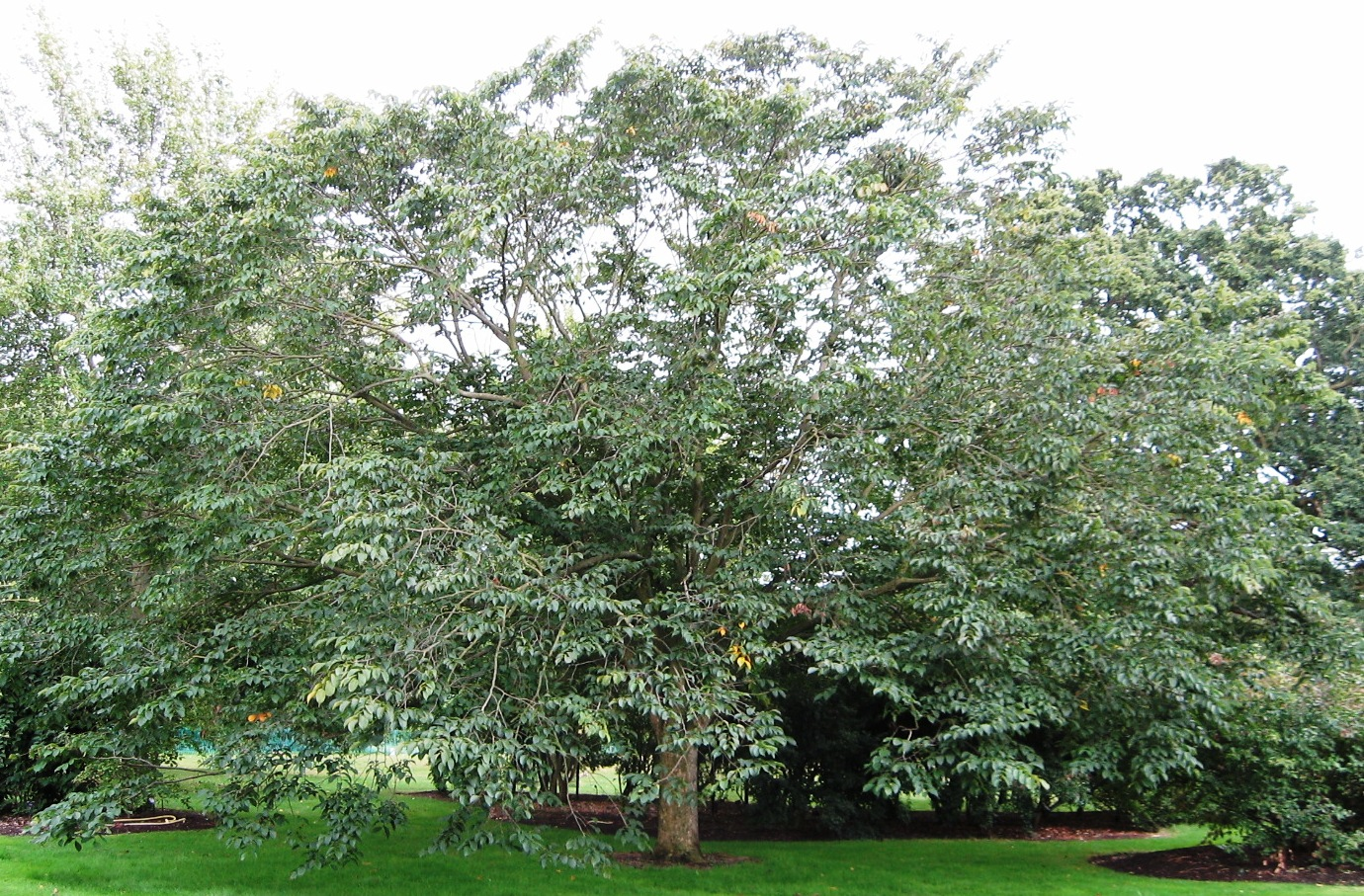
Ulmus laciniata var. nikkoensis, Kew Gardens

== Etymology ==
Var. nikkoensis is named for the Nikkō National Park near the city of Nikkō, 125 km north of Tokyo.

== Accessions ==
North America

- Arnold Arboretum, US. Acc. no. 17908, collected wild in Japan.
- Dawes Arboretum US.Newark, Ohio, US. 2 trees, no acc. details available.
- Morton Arboretum, US. Acc. no. 180–84, received 28 February 1978 as scions from Arnold Arboretum (their accession #17908-D); 9 m tall in 2006.

Europe

- Grange Farm Arboretum, Sutton St James, Spalding, Lincolnshire, UK. Acc. no. 515
- Royal Botanic Gardens, Kew, UK. Acc. no. not known.
- Great Fontley Farm, Fareham, UK, Butterfly Conservation Elm Trials plantation, Home Field (4 specimens, 'Putatives' above), Platt (1 specimen), all planted 2002, grown from seed collected Liaoning, China, collected by Dr George Ware, Morton Arboretum, Lisle, Illinois, US.

== Putative specimens ==
Trees at Great Fontley, Fareham, in southern England, grown from seed sent from Morton Arboretum and reputedly sourced in Liaoning Province, China, that were thought for many years to be Ulmus davidiana, have fruit and short petioles inconsistent with that species, but matching descriptions and photographs of Ulmus laciniata. Their leaves, to date (2023) lacking long extra tips, recall those of var. nikkoensis. In trials conducted by Butterfly Conservation, the specimens at Great Fontley often grew too rapidly in the comparatively benign conditions, the narrow stem unable to bear the weight of the burgeoning crown, leaving the tree arching to the ground. The same trees commenced flowering when aged nine years, in mid-March. They were defoliated at the crown by DED when only 6 years old and < 4 m (13 ft) high, but recovered. They were, however, heavily afflicted by slime flux during the exceptional drought of summer 2022; the only elm at Great Fontley to be so.

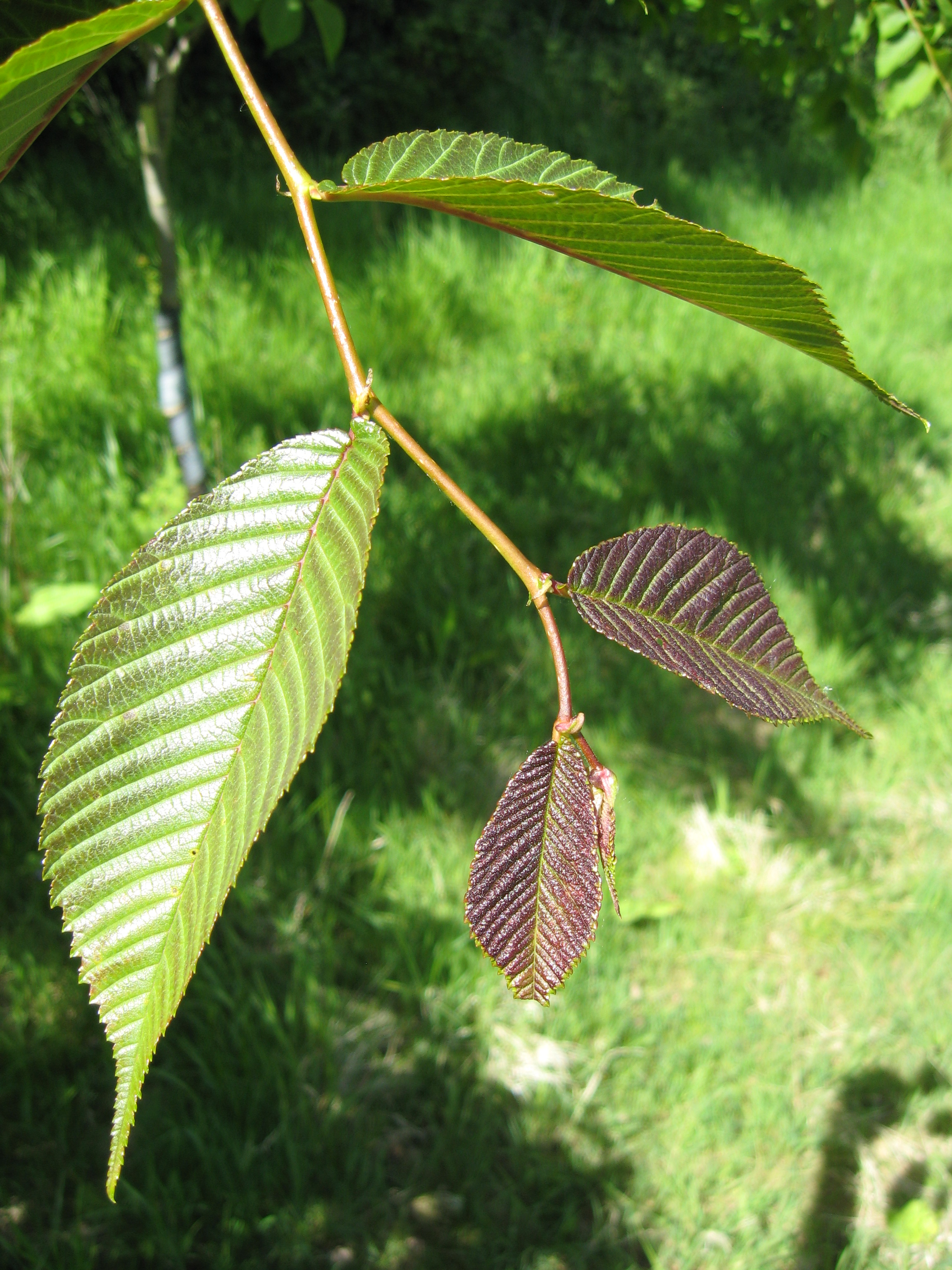
Emergent leaves, Great Fontley elm, grown from seed sent from Morton Arboretum

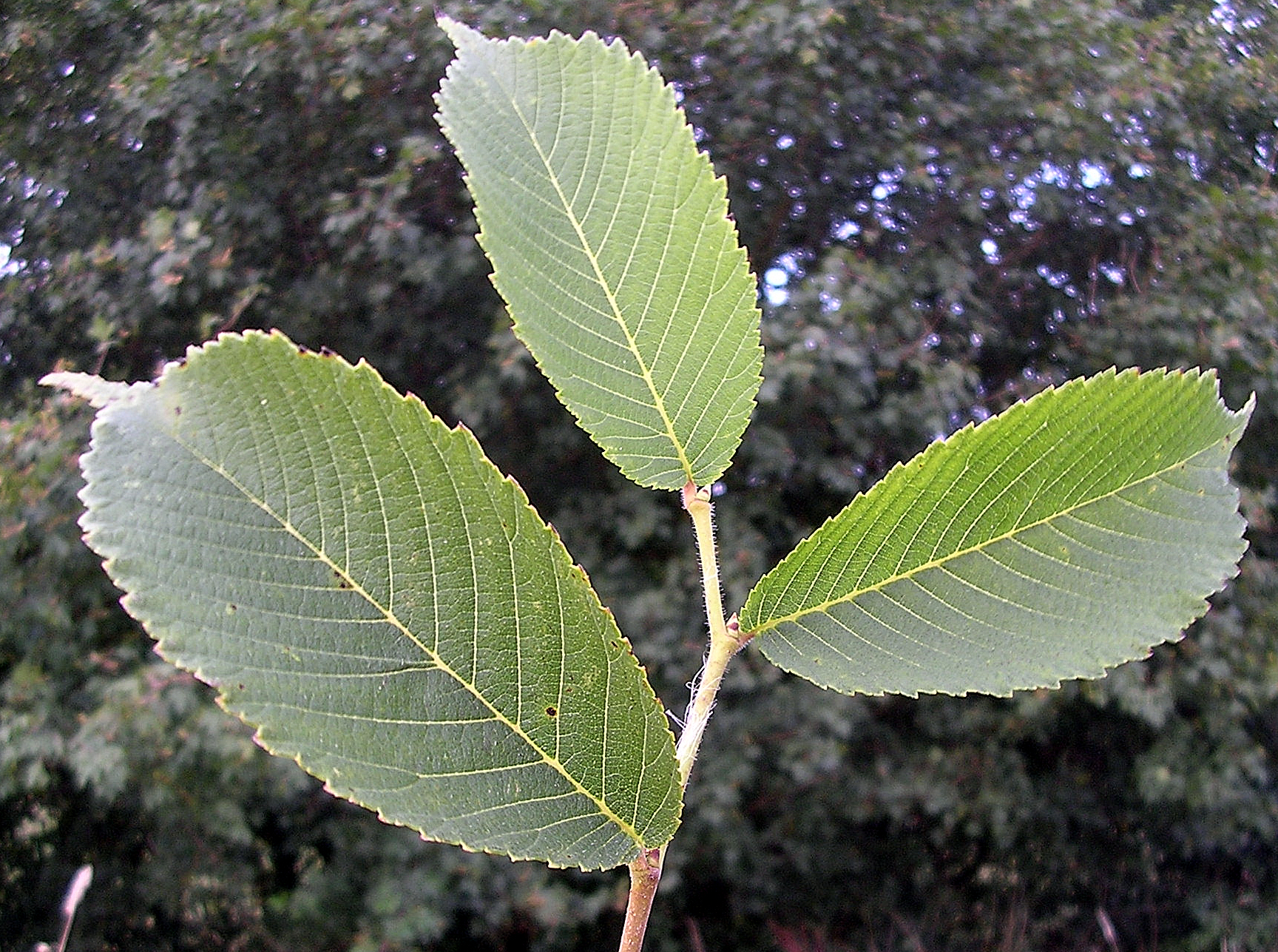
Same, leaves in midsummer

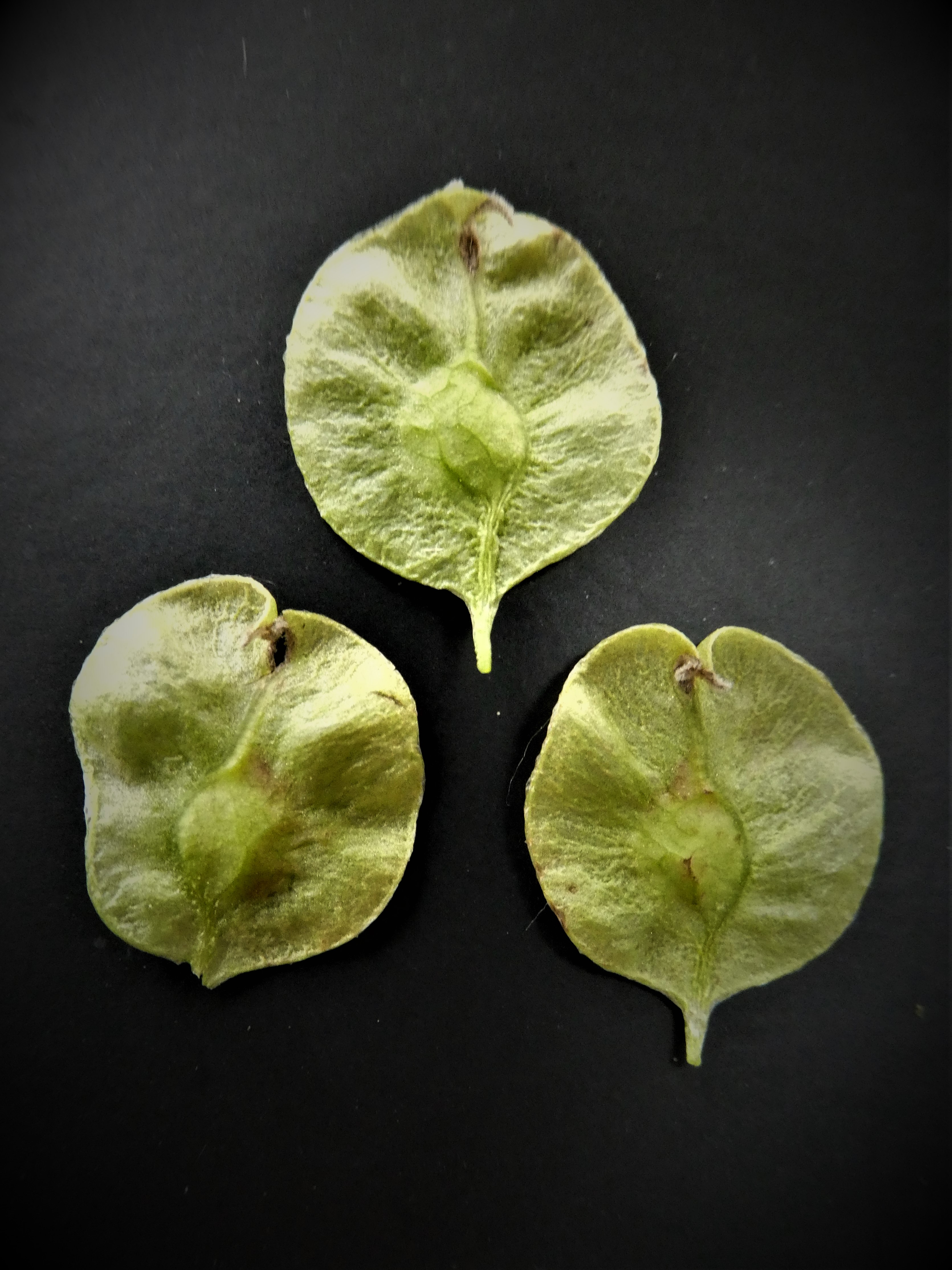
Samarae of same (2021)

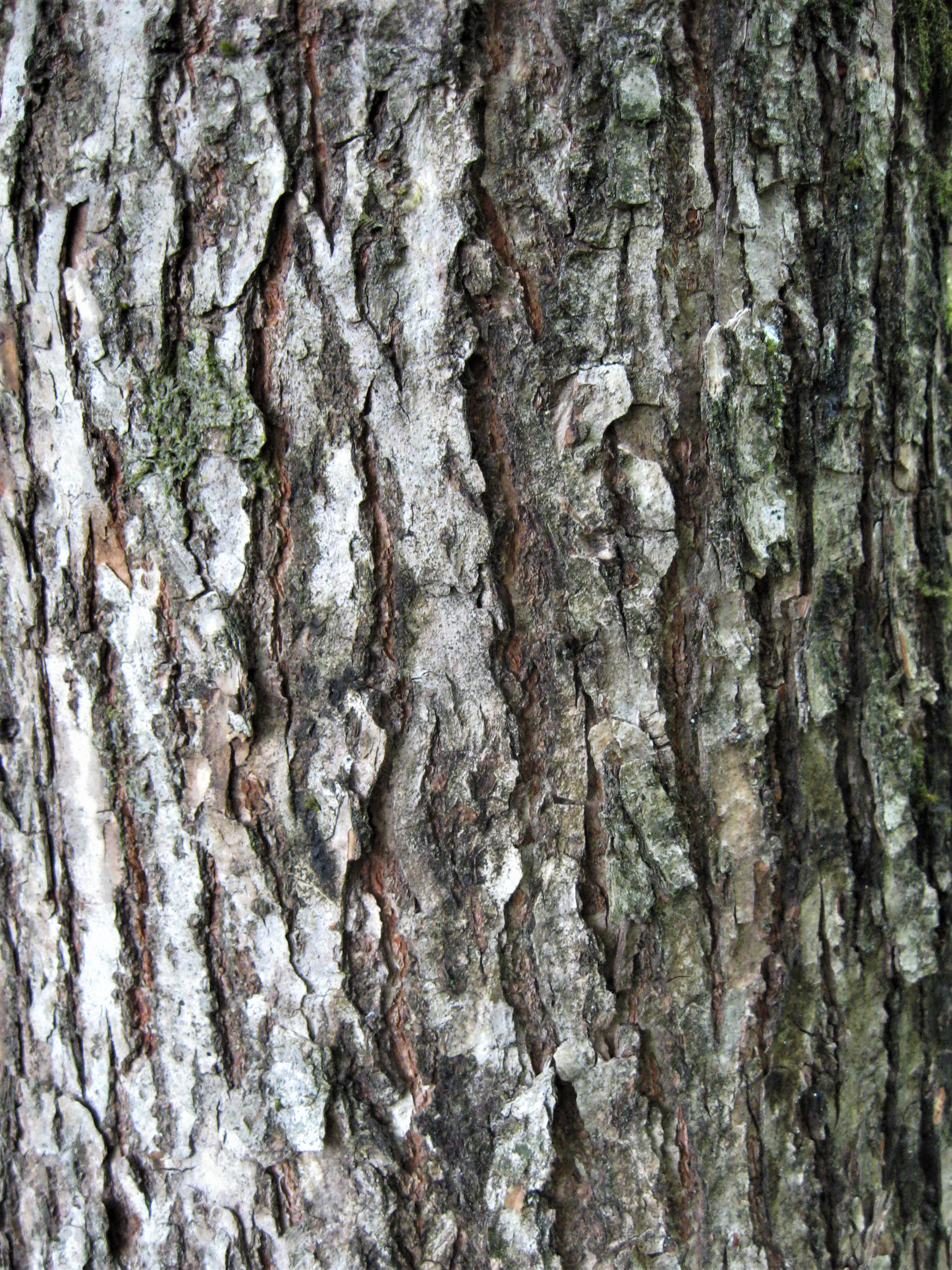
Same, bark of 30-year-old tree (2020)

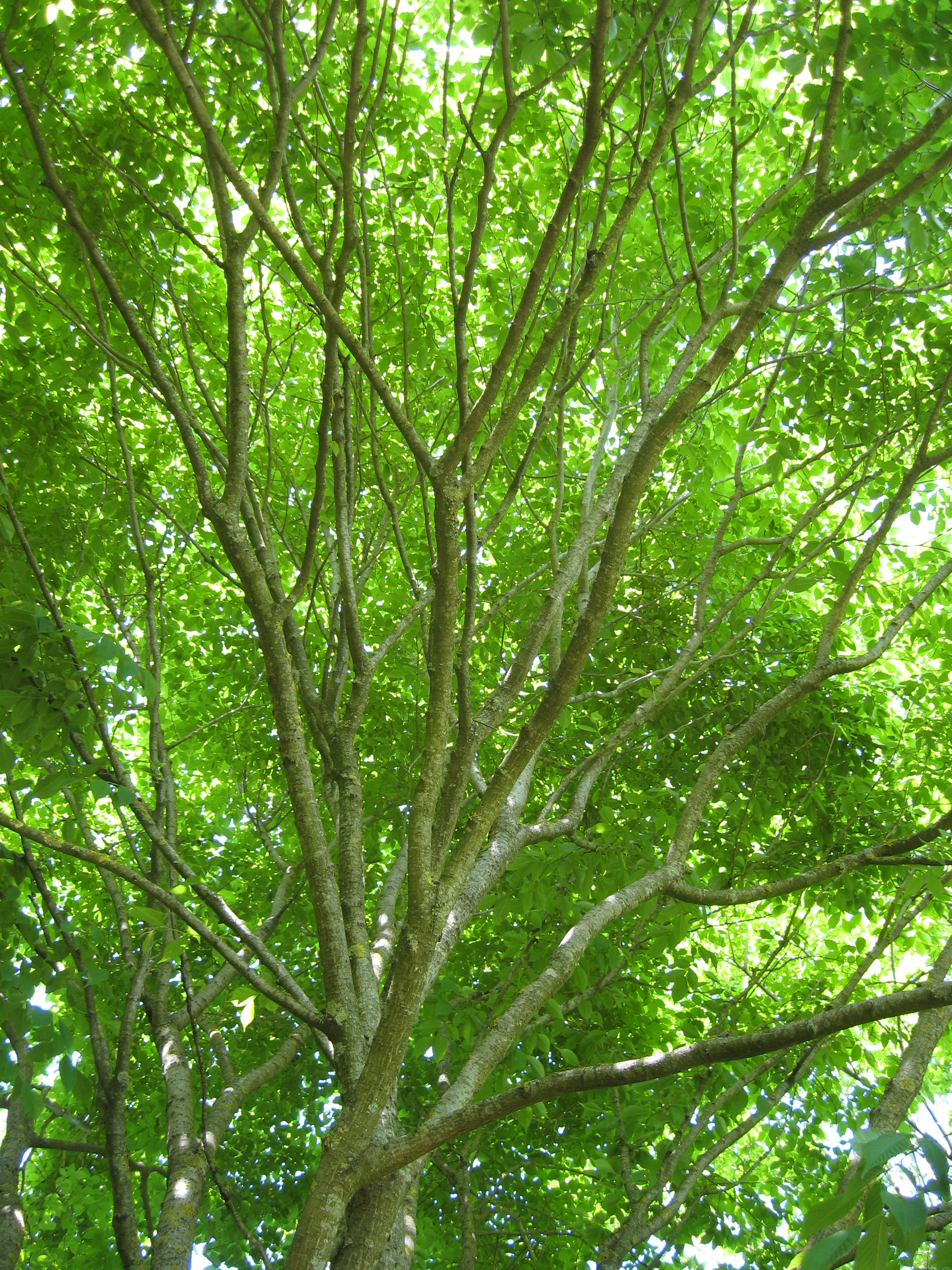
Closed canopy of Great Fontley tree, casting heavy shade
