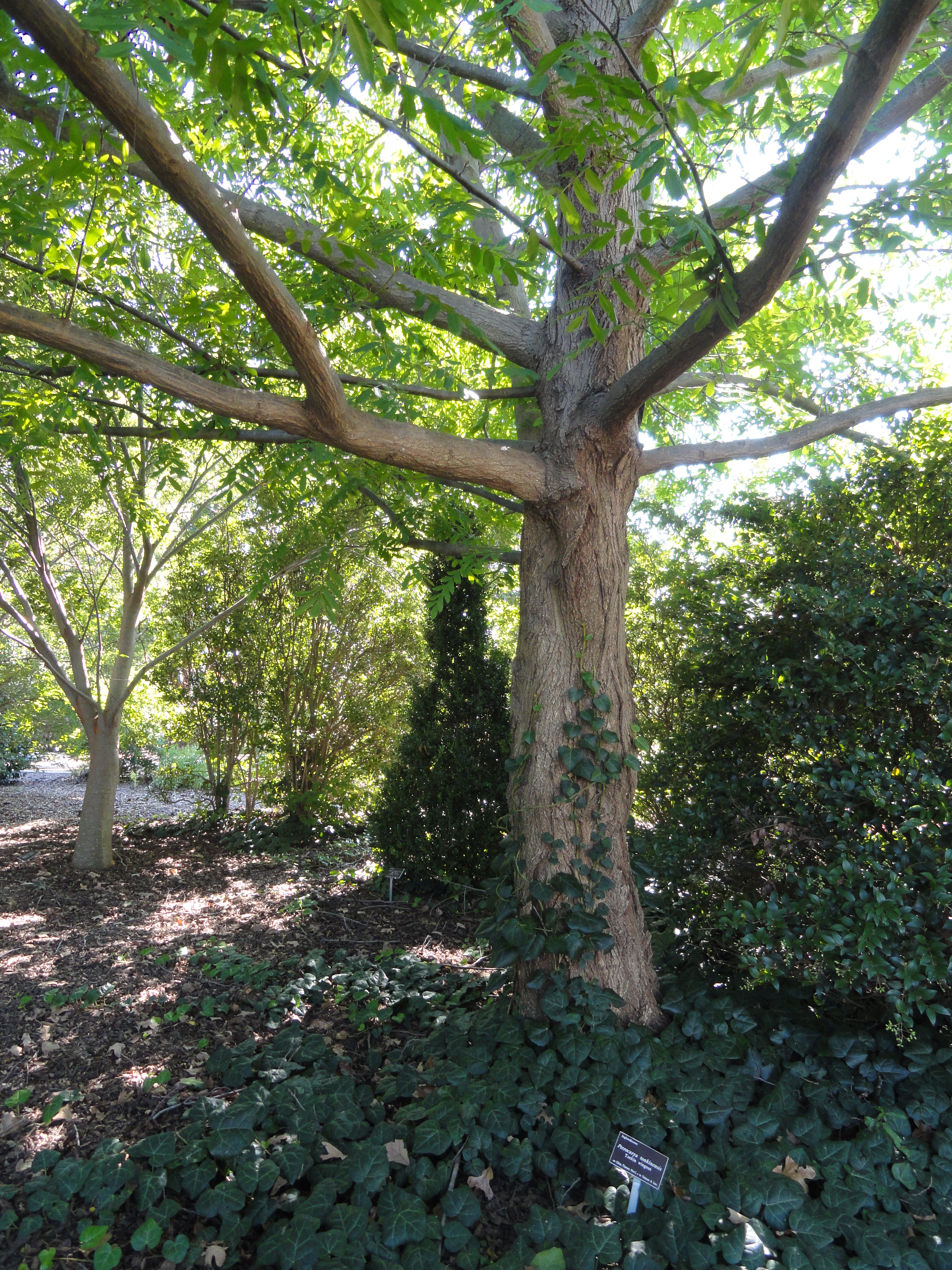

Conservation status
- Vulnerable (IUCN 3.1)

Scientific classification
- Kingdom: Plantae
- Clade: Embryophytes
- Clade: Tracheophytes
- Clade: Angiosperms
- Clade: Eudicots
- Clade: Rosids
- Order: Fagales
- Family: Juglandaceae
- Genus: Pterocarya
- Species: P. tonkinensis

Binomial name
- Pterocarya tonkinensis (Franch.) Dode

Synonyms
- Pterocarya stenoptera var. tonkinensis Franch.

= Pterocarya tonkinensis =

Species of tree

Pterocarya tonkinensis (越南枫杨, yue nan feng yang) is a tree in the Juglandaceae family that grows up to 30 meters in height. It is endemic to Laos, Vietnam and southern Yunnan, China.
