= Pterocarya stenoptera =

Chinese wingnut Temporal range: Neogene-Recent (Pliocene-Holocene), 5.3–0 Ma
- Pterocarya stenoptera on Laoshan, Shandong, China

Conservation status
- Least Concern (IUCN 3.1)

Scientific classification
- Kingdom: Plantae
- Clade: Tracheophytes
- Clade: Angiosperms
- Clade: Eudicots
- Clade: Rosids
- Order: Fagales
- Family: Juglandaceae
- Genus: Pterocarya
- Species: P. stenoptera

Binomial name
- Pterocarya stenoptera C.DC.
- Native range

Synonyms
- Acer mairei H. Léveillé; Pterocarya chinensis Lavallee; Pterocarya esquirolii H. Léveillé; Pterocarya japonica Lavallee; Pterocarya laevigata Lavallée; Pterocarya stenoptera var. brevialata Pampanini; Pterocarya stenoptera var. kouitchensis Franchet; Pterocarya stenoptera var. sinensis Graebner; Pterocarya stenoptera var. zhijiangensis Z.E.Chao & C.J.Zheng; Pterocarya stenoptera var. typica Franch.

Species of plant

Pterocarya stenoptera, the Chinese wingnut (Chinese: 楓楊; pinyin: fēngyáng), is a species of wingnut in the family Juglandaceae. It is a tree, native to China and Taiwan.

== Description ==
Pterocarya stenoptera is a deciduous tree growing to 30 metres tall. The leaves are alternate, pinnate, 8–16 (–25) cm long, with (6–) 11–21 (–25) leaflets, each leaflet elliptic-lanceolate, 8–12 cm long and 2–3 cm broad, with serrate margins; the terminal leaflet often, but not always, absent. The central rachis of the leaf is often winged, with a 1–2 mm wide wing with a serrated margin, along the length between the leaflets. The fruit is a small nut 6–7 mm diameter, with two wings 1.2-2.5 cm long and 0.3-0.6 cm broad on each nut; the nuts develop in pendulous catkins 20–45 cm long in the summer, hanging from the foliage. The nuts are similar to P. fraxinifolia, but differ in the shape of the wings, which are long and slenderer, unlike the fan-shaped wings of P. fraxinifolia nuts.

The bark on the trunk is similar to P. fraxinifolia, but is smoother.

== Distribution and habitat ==
It occurs in forests on mountain slopes or riverbanks, from near sea level to 1500 metres, in Anhui, Fujian, Gansu, Guangdong, Guangxi, Guizhou, Hainan, Hebei, Henan, Hubei, Hunan, Jiangsu, Jiangxi, Liaoning, Shaanxi, Shandong, Shanxi, Sichuan, Taiwan, Yunnan, and Zhejiang; it is also introduced in Japan and Korea.

== Ecology ==
Pterocarya stenoptera grows readily from seed that has received approximately three months of cold moist winter stratification. Germination is epigeal and typically requires a little more than ten days. The first true (pinnately compound) leaves appear after the seedling reaches a height of ~6 cm. The young seedlings do well under half-shade and a temperature of about 18 °C.

Pterocarya stenoptera can also be propagated by cuttings.

== Uses ==
Used in East Asian classical garden design. It is also grown as an ornamental tree in Japan, Korea, and more rarely in Europe and North America.

A hybrid between P. stenoptera and P. fraxinifolia, named Pterocarya × rehderiana, has been developed in cultivation. It is intermediate between the parents, but more vigorous due to heterosis.

A pair of Chinese wingnuts flanking the old lantern of the Baochu Pagoda in Hangzhou

Young leaf showing the winged rachis, in Wuhan

Foliage and fruiting catkins, in Wuhan

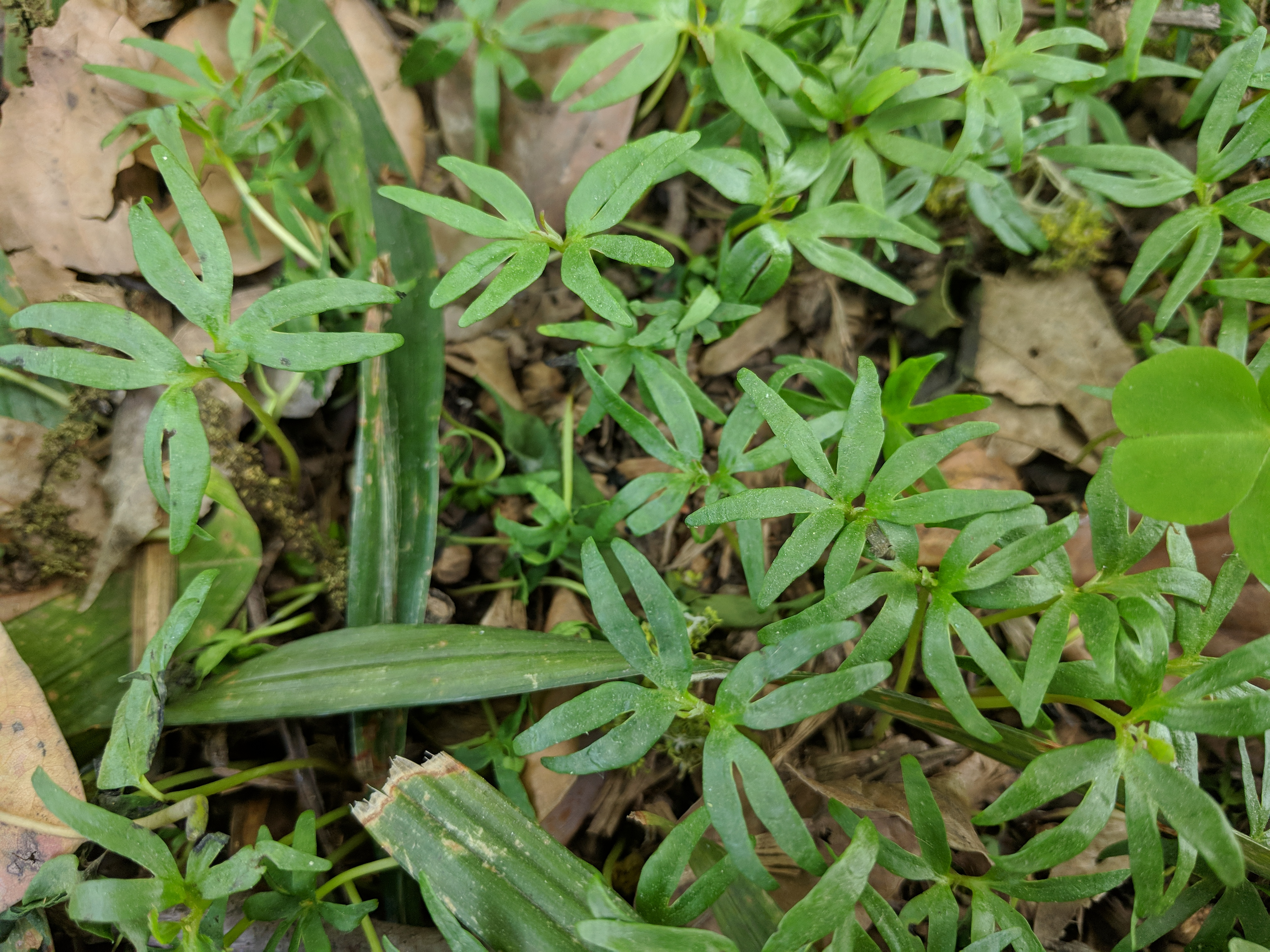
Seedlings, showing the unusual four-lobed cotyledons; Wuhan

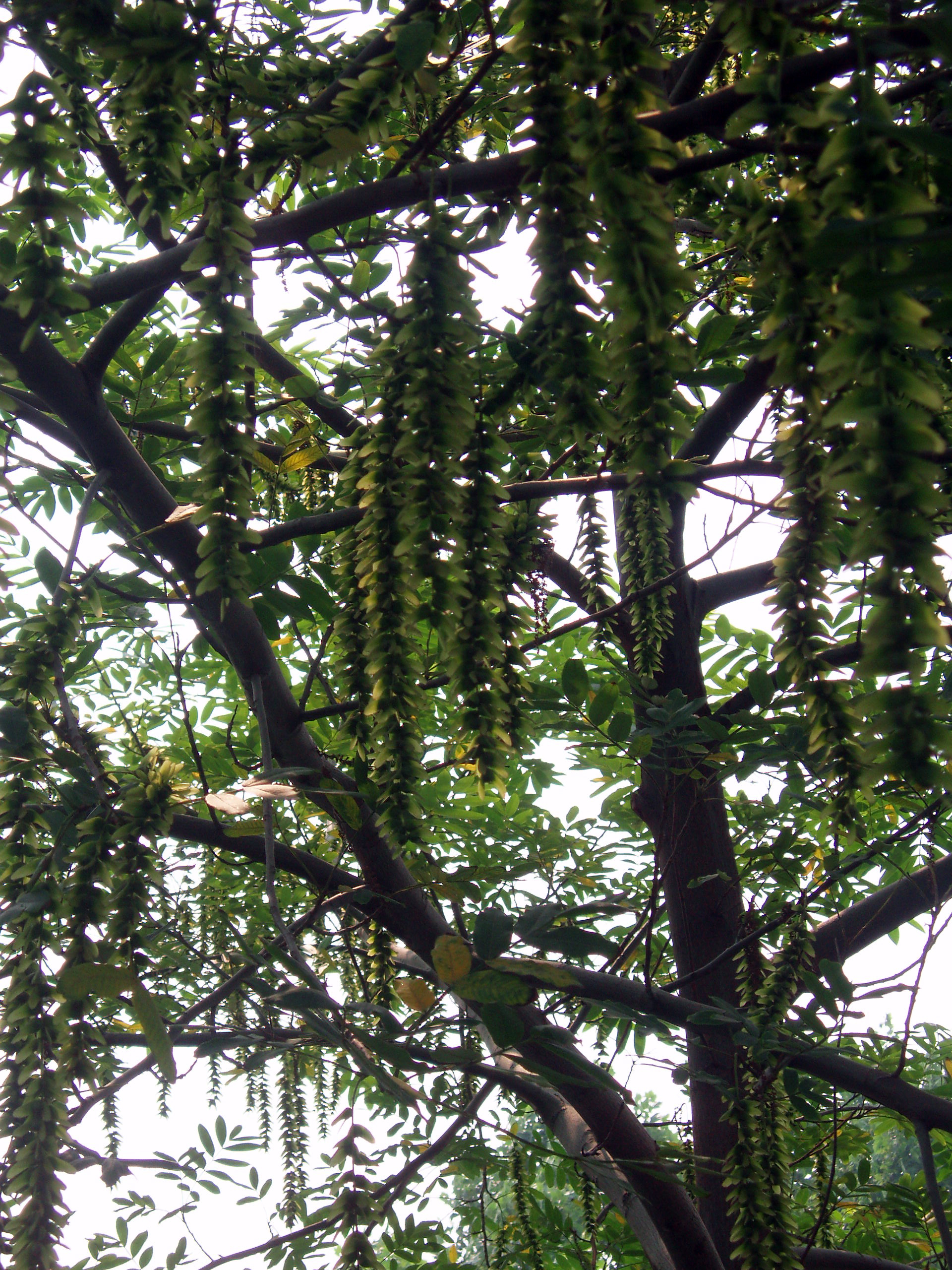
Tree with fruit
