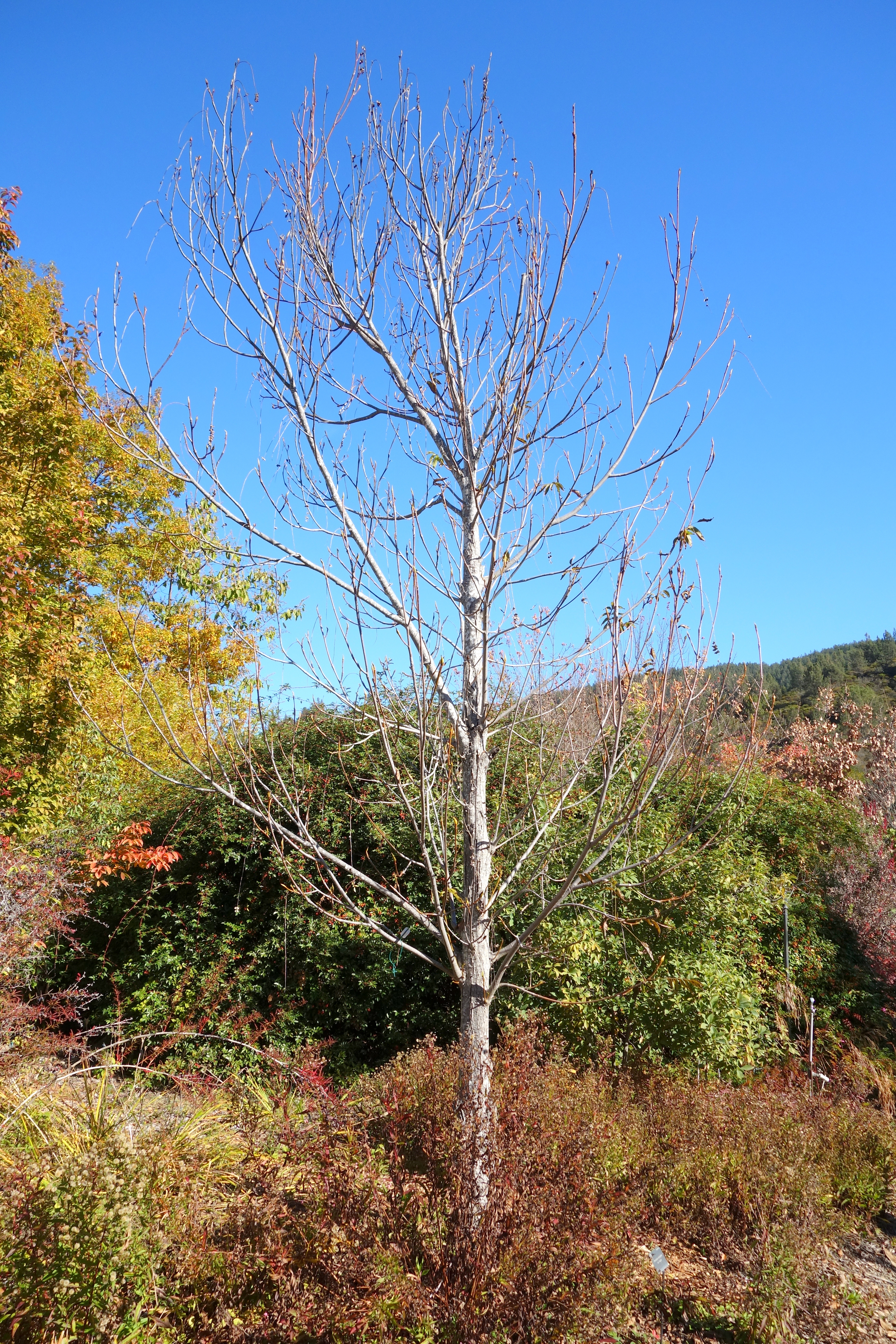

Conservation status
- Vulnerable (IUCN 3.1)

Scientific classification
- Kingdom: Plantae
- Clade: Embryophytes
- Clade: Tracheophytes
- Clade: Angiosperms
- Clade: Eudicots
- Clade: Rosids
- Order: Fagales
- Family: Juglandaceae
- Genus: Pterocarya
- Species: P. macroptera

Binomial name
- Pterocarya macroptera Batalin

Varieties
- Pterocarya macroptera var. delavayi (Franch.) W.E.Manning; Pterocarya macroptera var. insignis (Rehder & E.H.Wilson) W.E.Manning; Pterocarya macroptera var. macroptera

Synonyms
- synonyms of var. delavayi: Pterocarya delavayi Franch.; Pterocarya forrestii W.W.Sm.; Pterocarya macroptera var. forrestii (W.W.Sm.) W.E.Manning; synonyms of var. insignis: Pterocarya insignis Rehder & E.H.Wilson; Pterocarya laruei H.Lév.

= Pterocarya macroptera =

Species of tree

Pterocarya macroptera, the large-winged wingnut, is a species of Pterocarya native to the temperate parts of China. It can be found in much of north-central, south-central, and southeast China and Tibet. On average, a tree grows to around 15-30 meters (49.2-98.4 ft). The species belongs to the section Platyptera within the genus Pterocarya, which also includes P. rhoifolia, P.insignis and P. delavayi. Some scientists consider P. insignis and P. delavayi to be varieties of Pterocarya macroptera. The species is vulnerable.

== Description ==
Pterocarya macroptera is a medium to large deciduous tree, typically reaching heights of 15–30 meters. It is characterized by a broad, spreading crown and a straight trunk with grayish-brown bark that becomes fissured with age. The leaves are alternate and pinnately compound, usually consisting of 11–21 lanceolate to ovate-lanceolate leaflets with serrated margins. The species produces catkin-like inflorescences, with male and female flowers borne separately on the same tree (monoecious). The fruit is a distinctive samara—an oval nut flanked by two broad, membranous wings that aid in wind dispersal, giving the tree its common name "wingnut." Terminal buds have caducous scales.

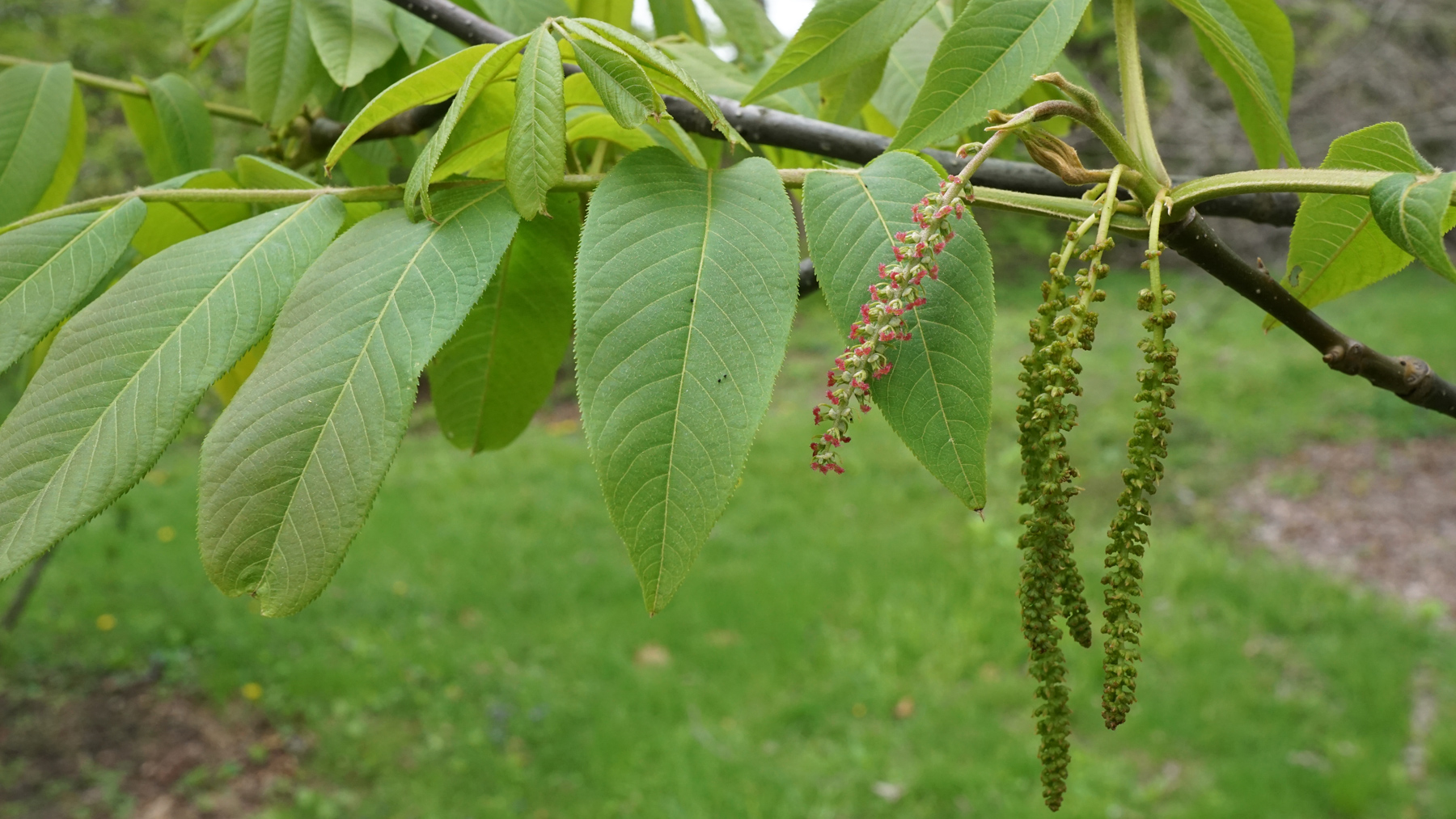
Pterocarya macroptera var. insignis

== Ecology ==
Pterocarya macroptera is a riparian and montane tree species that thrives in moist, temperate environments across central and southwestern China. It commonly grows along riverbanks, valley slopes, and mixed deciduous forests at elevations between 1,000 and 2,500 meters. Ecological and genomic studies indicate that P. macroptera shows strong local adaptation to temperature and humidity gradients. Populations are structured into three genetic lineages—the Qinling-Daba-Tianmu, Western Sichuan, and Northwest Yunnan groups—each adapted to distinct climatic conditions.

== Varieties ==
Three varieties are accepted:

- Pterocarya macroptera var. delavayi (Franch.) W.E.Manning – Tibet and south-central China
- Pterocarya macroptera var. insignis (Rehder & E.H.Wilson) W.E.Manning – Central China to Zhejiang
- Pterocarya macroptera var. macroptera – southern Shaanxi to northeastern Sichuan

== Cultivation ==
The species is commonly cultivated. It is hardy to USDA Zones 5–8. Some varieties are rather fast growing.
