= Eumecocera argyrosticta =

Scientific classification
- Domain: Eukaryota
- Kingdom: Animalia
- Phylum: Arthropoda
- Class: Insecta
- Order: Coleoptera
- Suborder: Polyphaga
- Infraorder: Cucujiformia
- Family: Cerambycidae
- Genus: Eumecocera
- Species: E. argyrosticta

Binomial name
- Eumecocera argyrosticta (Bates, 1884)

Synonyms
- Stenostola argyrosticta Bates, 1884

Species of beetle

Eumecocera argyrosticta is a species of beetle in the family Cerambycidae. It was first described by Henry Walter Bates in 1884. It is found in Japan.
