= Eumecocera trivittata =

Scientific classification
- Kingdom: Animalia
- Phylum: Arthropoda
- Class: Insecta
- Order: Coleoptera
- Suborder: Polyphaga
- Infraorder: Cucujiformia
- Family: Cerambycidae
- Genus: Eumecocera
- Species: E. trivittata

Binomial name
- Eumecocera trivittata (Breuning, 1947)

Synonyms
- Stenostola trivittata Breuning, 1947

Species of beetle

Eumecocera trivittata is a species of beetle in the family Cerambycidae. It was first described by Stephan von Breuning in 1947. It is known from Japan. It contains the subspecies Eumecocera trivittata brunnescens.
