= Eumecocera callosicollis =

Scientific classification
- Kingdom: Animalia
- Phylum: Arthropoda
- Class: Insecta
- Order: Coleoptera
- Suborder: Polyphaga
- Infraorder: Cucujiformia
- Family: Cerambycidae
- Genus: Eumecocera
- Species: E. callosicollis

Binomial name
- Eumecocera callosicollis Breuning 1943

Synonyms
- Stenostola callosicollis (Breuning, 1943)

Species of beetle

Eumecocera callosicollis is a species of beetle in the family Cerambycidae. It was first described by Stephan von Breuning in 1943. It is known from China and Russia.
