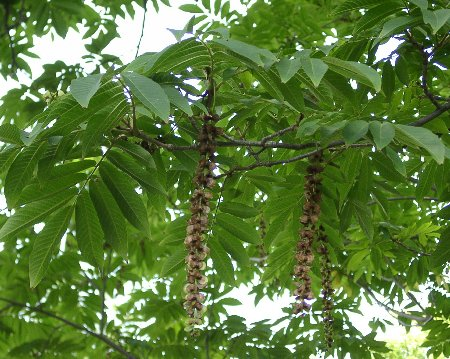
- Japanese Wingnut (Pterocarya rhoifolia)

Scientific classification
- Kingdom: Plantae
- Clade: Tracheophytes
- Clade: Angiosperms
- Clade: Eudicots
- Clade: Rosids
- Order: Fagales
- Family: Juglandaceae
- Subfamily: Juglandoideae
- Tribe: Juglandeae
- Subtribe: Juglandinae
- Genus: Pterocarya; Nutt. ex Moq.

Species
- See text

= Pterocarya =

Pterocarya Temporal range: Paleogene-Recent (Paleocene-Holocene), 66–0 Ma

Genus of trees

Pterocarya, often called wingnuts in English, are trees in the walnut family Juglandaceae. They are native to Asia and the extreme southeast of Europe, from the Caucasus Mountains east to Japan. The botanic name is from Ancient Greek πτερόν (pteron) "wing" + κάρυον (karyon) "nut". The genus is of particular scientific interest as a classic relict lineage, with a modern distribution disjunct between East Asia and the Caucasus–West Asian region, while its fossil record shows it was once widespread across much of the Northern Hemisphere. In Western Europe, the genus was present on Doggerland until shortly before it was flooded a few thousand years ago. Many fossils are known from the New World and the genus survived in the New world till the Pliocene. Most species of wingnuts are large, fast-growing trees, often associated with riverbanks, floodplains, and moist temperate forests. They are distinguished by pinnate leaves, monoecious flowers, and fruit with lateral wings that aid wind and water dispersal. Several species, such as Pterocarya stenoptera and Pterocarya fraxinifolia, are widely cultivated as ornamental or shade trees due to their graceful form and tolerance of wet soils.

== Description ==
Pterocarya are deciduous trees, 10–40 m (33–131 ft) tall, with pinnate leaves 20–45 cm long, with 11–25 leaflets; the shoots have chambered pith, a character shared with the walnuts (Juglans) but not the hickories (Carya) in the same family.

The flowers are produced in male and female catkins in the same tree (monoecious). The seed catkins when mature, about six months after pollination, are pendulous, 15–45 cm long, with 20–80 seeds strung along them.

The seeds are a small nut 5–10 mm across, with two wings, one each side. In some of the species, the wings are short (5–10 mm) and broad (5–10 mm), in others longer (10–25 mm) and narrower (2–5 mm).

They are flood tolerant as they develop lenticels and aeration pathways that help oxygen diffuse from shoots to submerged roots, reducing hypoxia damage during flooding events.

They also exhibit some drought tolerance because they respond to water stress by accumulating soluble sugars, which help cells retain water and maintain turgor pressure.

=== Species ===
Six species are currently accepted:

Image	Scientific name	Common name	Distribution
	Pterocarya fraxinifolia	Caucasian wingnut	The Caucasus and Elburz mountains in southwest Asia and adjacent southeasternmost Europe.
	Pterocarya hupehensis	Hubei wingnut	Central China.
	Pterocarya macroptera	Large-winged wingnut	West and southwest China.
	Pterocarya rhoifolia	Japanese wingnut	Japan, eastern China (Shandong).
	Pterocarya stenoptera	Chinese wingnut	China, widespread.
	Pterocarya tonkinensis	Tonkin wingnut	Southernmost China (Yunnan), Indo-China.

Another species from China, the wheel wingnut with similar foliage but an unusual circular wing right round the nut (instead of two wings at the sides), previously listed as Pterocarya paliurus, has now been transferred to a new genus, as Cyclocarya paliurus.

=== Hybrids ===
- Pterocarya × rehderiana - (P. fraxinifolia × P. stenoptera).

=== Uses ===
Wingnuts are very attractive, large and fast-growing trees, occasionally planted in parks and large gardens. The most common in general cultivation outside Asia is P. fraxinifolia, but the most attractive is probably P. rhoifolia. The hybrid P. × rehderiana, between P. fraxinifolia and P. stenoptera, is even faster-growing and has occasionally been planted for timber production. The wood is of good quality, similar to walnut, though not quite so dense and strong.
