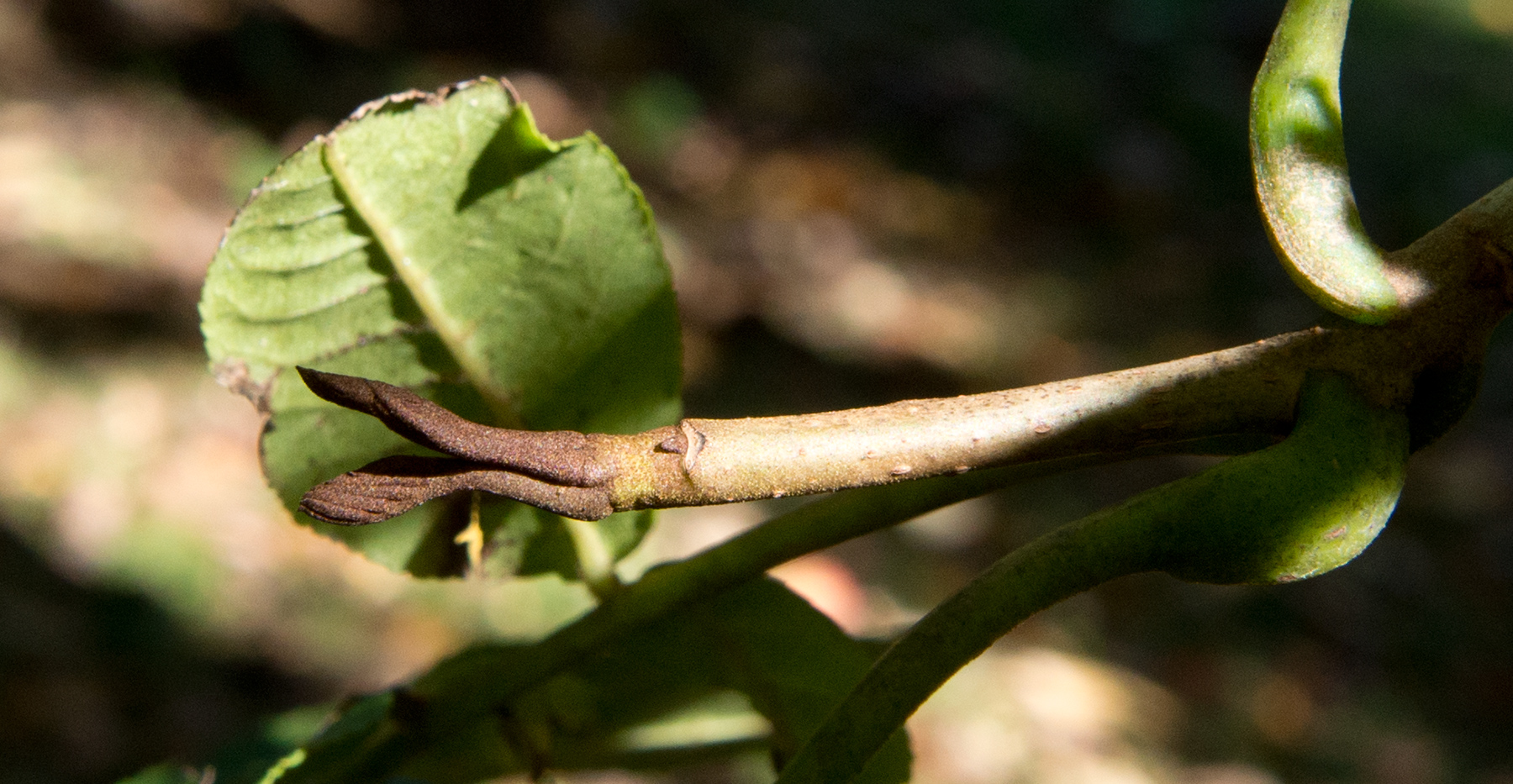

Conservation status
- Vulnerable (IUCN 3.1)

Scientific classification
- Kingdom: Plantae
- Clade: Embryophytes
- Clade: Tracheophytes
- Clade: Angiosperms
- Clade: Eudicots
- Clade: Rosids
- Order: Fagales
- Family: Juglandaceae
- Genus: Pterocarya
- Species: P. hupehensis

Binomial name
- Pterocarya hupehensis Skan

Synonyms
- Pterocarya sprengeri Pamp.

= Pterocarya hupehensis =

Species of tree

Pterocarya hupehensis (commonly known as the Hubei Wingnut) is a tree in the Juglandaceae family native to China. It grows on moist streambanks at 700 to 2,000 m (2,300 to 6,600 ft) elevation—mostly in North Guizhou, West Hubei (Changyang Xian), South Shaanxi, West Sichuan. Genetic and phylogeographic research indicates that populations of P. hupehensis experienced historical divergence and demographic changes associated with the strengthening of the East Asian monsoon and Quaternary climatic fluctuations.

== Description ==
Pterocarya hupehensis is a deciduous broad-leaved tree. It is large and can grow up to 20 m (65.6 ft) tall. It has pale grey bark which is fissured. The leaves are 12-30 cm long.
