= Eumecocera impustulata =

Scientific classification
- Domain: Eukaryota
- Kingdom: Animalia
- Phylum: Arthropoda
- Class: Insecta
- Order: Coleoptera
- Suborder: Polyphaga
- Infraorder: Cucujiformia
- Family: Cerambycidae
- Genus: Eumecocera
- Species: E. impustulata

Binomial name
- Eumecocera impustulata (Motschulsky, 1860)

Synonyms
- Saperda impustulata Motschulsky, 1860; Stenostola impustulata (Motschulsky, 1860)

Species of beetle

Stenostola impustulata is a species of beetle in the family Cerambycidae. It was first described by Victor Motschulsky in 1860, originally under the genus Saperda. It is known from Mongolia, Japan, North Korea, China, and Russia.
