= Eumecocera minamii =

Scientific classification
- Domain: Eukaryota
- Kingdom: Animalia
- Phylum: Arthropoda
- Class: Insecta
- Order: Coleoptera
- Suborder: Polyphaga
- Infraorder: Cucujiformia
- Family: Cerambycidae
- Genus: Eumecocera
- Species: E. minamii

Binomial name
- Eumecocera minamii Makihara, 1984

Synonyms
- Stenostola minamii (Makihara, 1984)

Species of beetle

Eumecocera minamii is a species of beetle in the family Cerambycidae. It was first described by Hiroshi Makihara in 1984.
