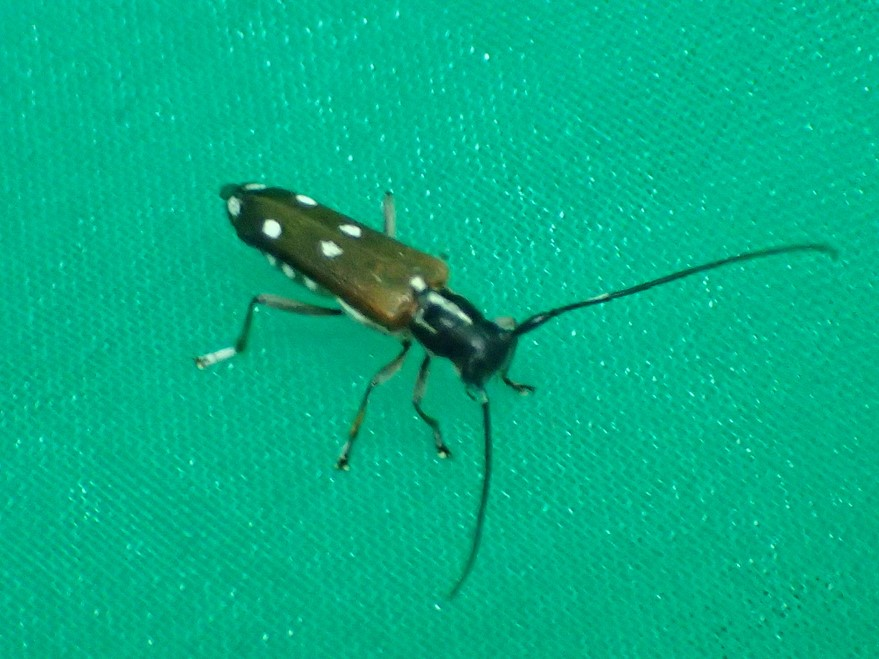
- Eumecocera gleneoides

Scientific classification
- Domain: Eukaryota
- Kingdom: Animalia
- Phylum: Arthropoda
- Class: Insecta
- Order: Coleoptera
- Suborder: Polyphaga
- Infraorder: Cucujiformia
- Family: Cerambycidae
- Tribe: Saperdini
- Genus: Eumecocera; Solsky, 1871

= Eumecocera =

Genus of beetles

Eumecocera is a genus of longhorn beetles of the subfamily Lamiinae, containing the following species:

- Eumecocera anomala (Bates, 1884)
- Eumecocera argyrosticta (Bates, 1884)
- Eumecocera callosicollis Breuning 1943
- Eumecocera gleneoides (Gressitt, 1935)
- Eumecocera impustulata (Motschulsky, 1860)
- Eumecocera minamii Makihara 1984
- Eumecocera trivittata (Breuning, 1947)
- Eumecocera unicolor (Kono, 1933)
