= Eumecocera anomala =

Scientific classification
- Domain: Eukaryota
- Kingdom: Animalia
- Phylum: Arthropoda
- Class: Insecta
- Order: Coleoptera
- Suborder: Polyphaga
- Infraorder: Cucujiformia
- Family: Cerambycidae
- Genus: Eumecocera
- Species: E. anomala

Binomial name
- Eumecocera anomala (Bates, 1884)

Synonyms
- Eumecocera morii Makihara, 2002; Stenostola anomala Bates

Species of beetle

Eumecocera anomala is a species of beetle in the family Cerambycidae. It was first described by Henry Walter Bates in 1884. It is known from Japan.
