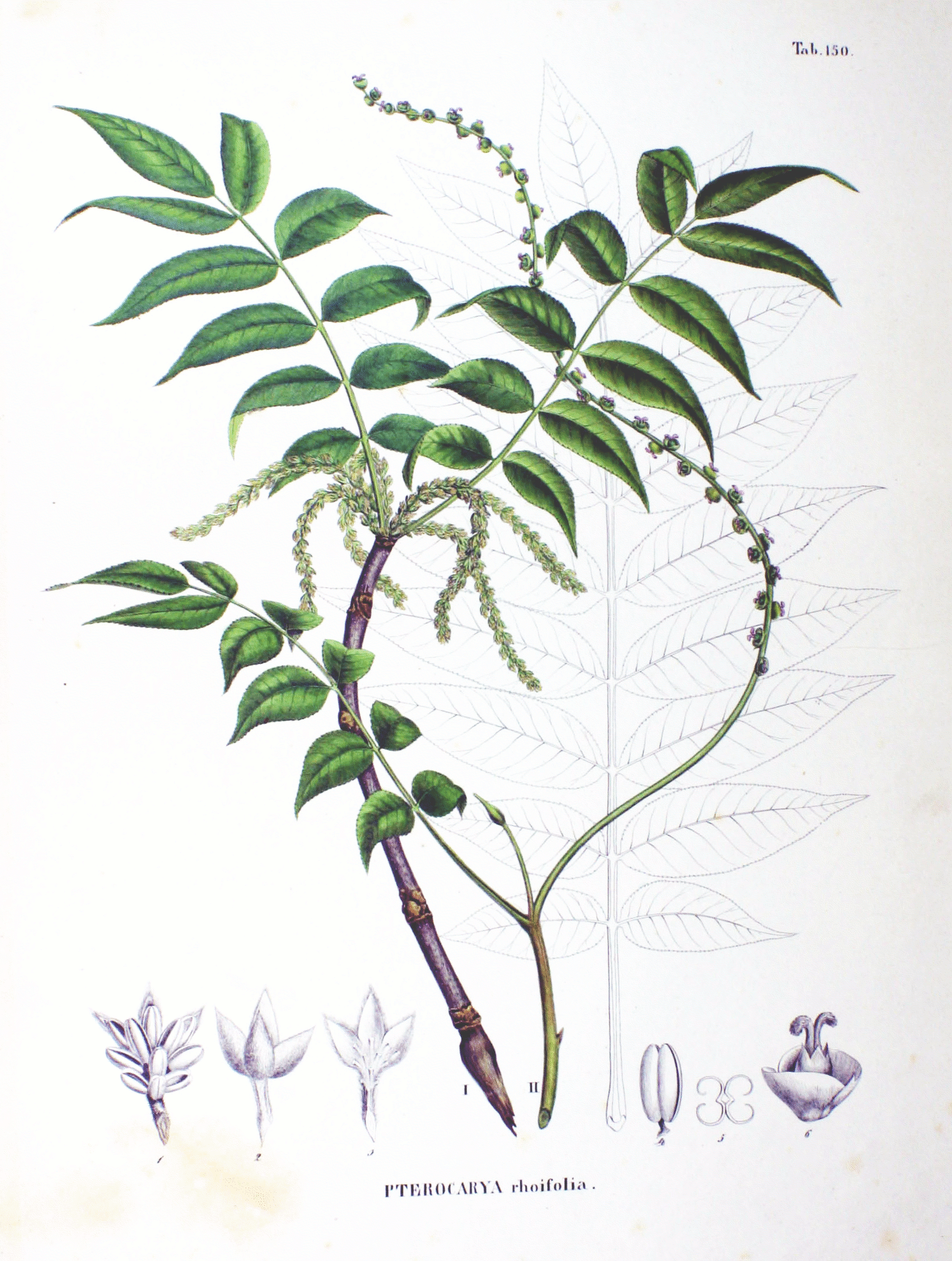

Conservation status
- Least Concern (IUCN 3.1)

Scientific classification
- Kingdom: Plantae
- Clade: Embryophytes
- Clade: Tracheophytes
- Clade: Angiosperms
- Clade: Eudicots
- Clade: Rosids
- Order: Fagales
- Family: Juglandaceae
- Genus: Pterocarya
- Species: P. rhoifolia

Binomial name
- Pterocarya rhoifolia Siebold & Zucc.

Synonyms
- Pterocarya diechocarpa Lavallée; Pterocarya fraxinifolia var. sorbifolia (Siebold & Zucc.) Zabel; Pterocarya sorbifolia Siebold & Zucc.

= Pterocarya rhoifolia =

Species of tree

Pterocarya rhoifolia, commonly known as Japanese wingnut, is a species of tree in the family Juglandaceae. It is widely distributed throughout Japan and southern Korea, and also found in China in the Laoshan District of eastern Shandong Province. Its natural presence in China is contested.

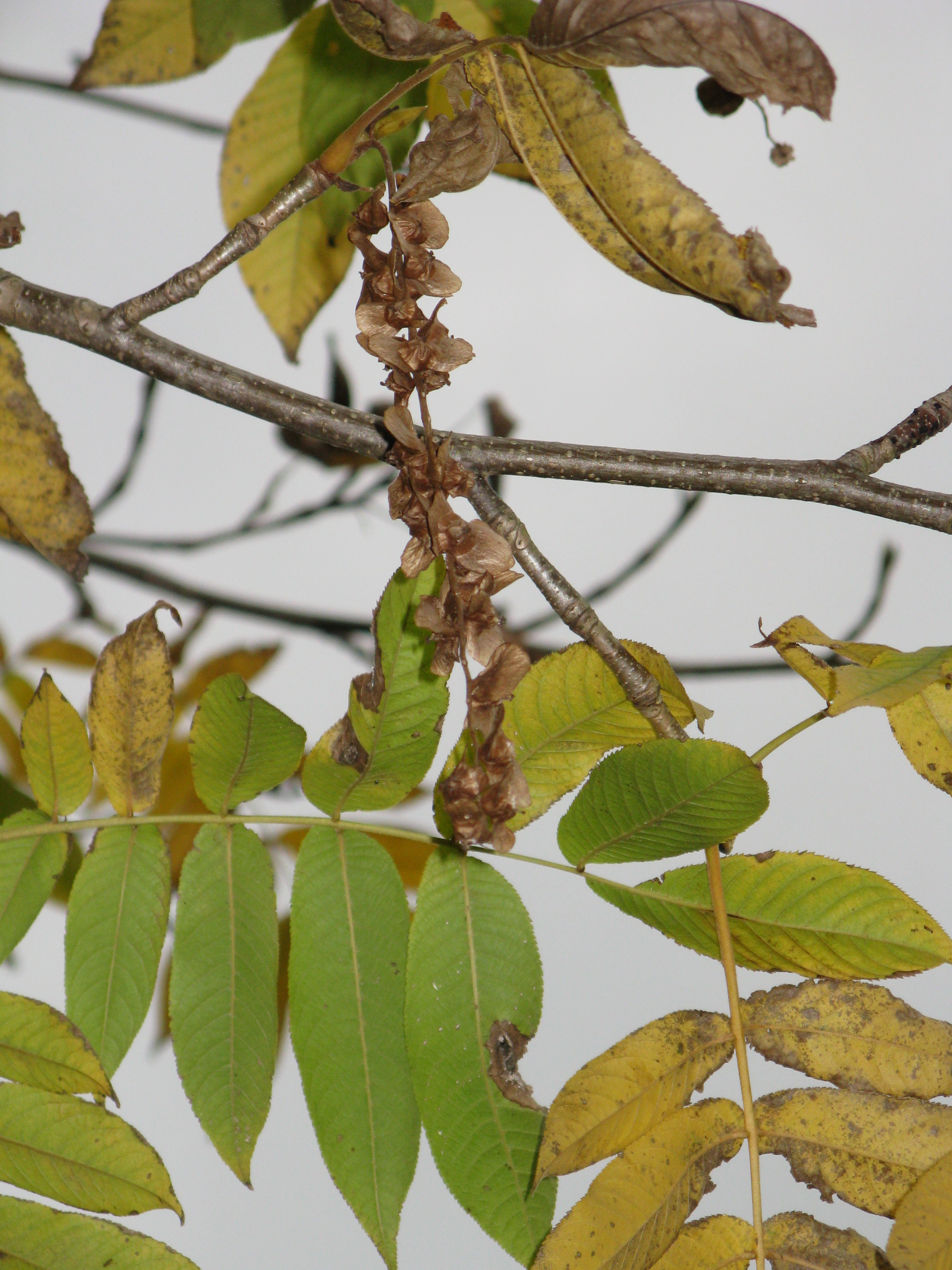
Fruiting tree

The tree flourishes in moist areas along riverbanks and mountain streams, and attains 30 m (98 ft) in height, flowering from May–July.

It is a soft light wood, with the heartwood yellowish-white in color, which has been used as a substitute of kiri (Paulownia tomentosa), for example, to make geta clogs that are imitations of kiri-geta. It is straight-grained and the pore pattern on the surface provides the wood with a handsome appearance.
