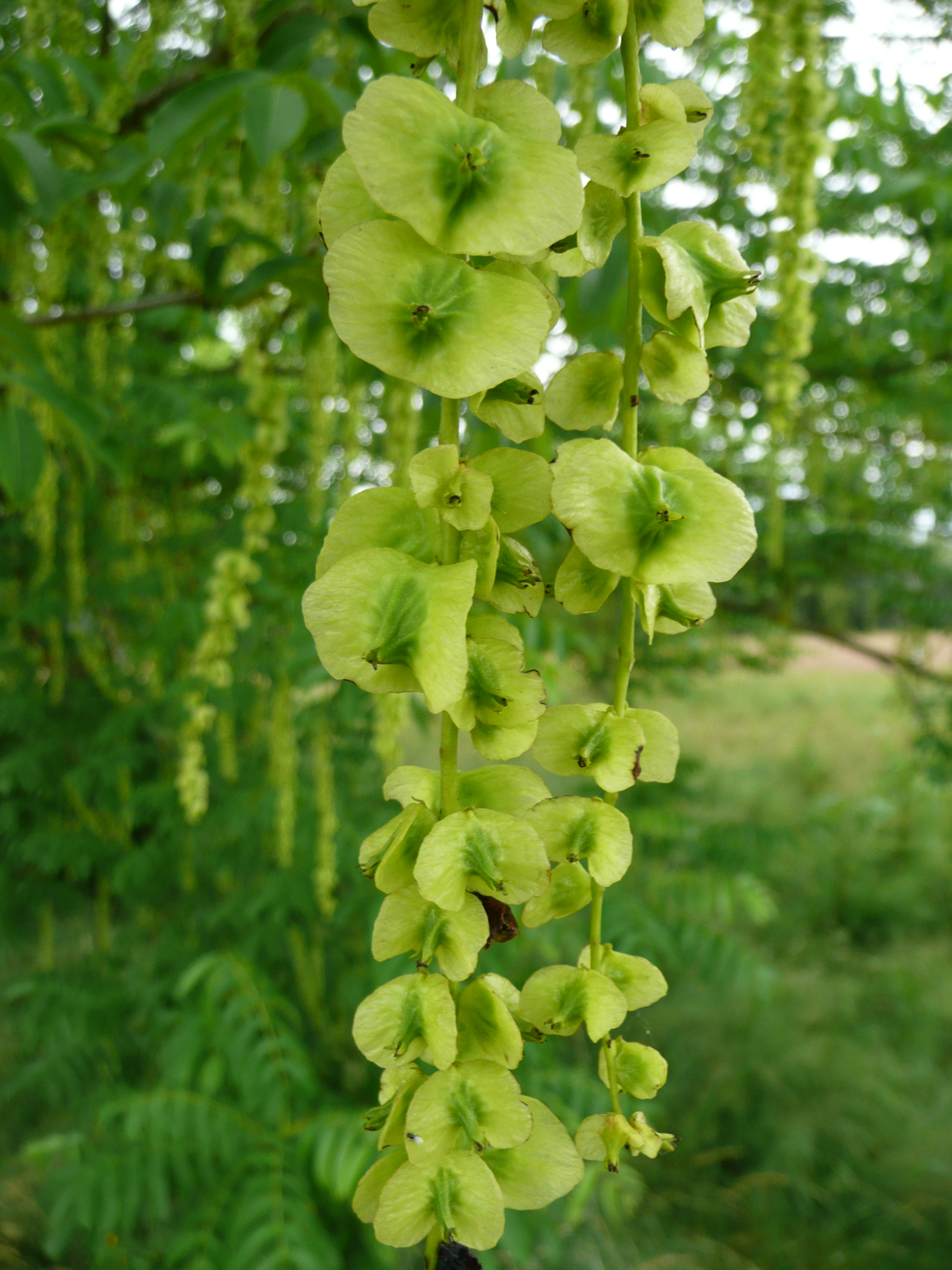
- Characteristic fruits of Caucasian wingnut

Conservation status
- Vulnerable (IUCN 3.1)

Scientific classification
- Kingdom: Plantae
- Clade: Embryophytes
- Clade: Tracheophytes
- Clade: Angiosperms
- Clade: Eudicots
- Clade: Rosids
- Order: Fagales
- Family: Juglandaceae
- Genus: Pterocarya
- Species: P. fraxinifolia

Binomial name
- Pterocarya fraxinifolia (Lam.) Spach

Synonyms
- Juglans fraxinifolia Lam.; Pterocarya caucasica C.A.Mey.; Pterocarya pterocarpa (Michx.) Kunth

= Pterocarya fraxinifolia =

Species of wingnut tree

Pterocarya fraxinifolia is a species of tree in the Juglandaceae family. It is commonly known as the Caucasian wingnut or Caucasian walnut. It is native to the Caucasian region Armenia, Azerbaijan, Georgia, Iran, Russia, Ukraine and Turkey. It was introduced to France in 1784, and to Great Britain after 1800.

== Description ==
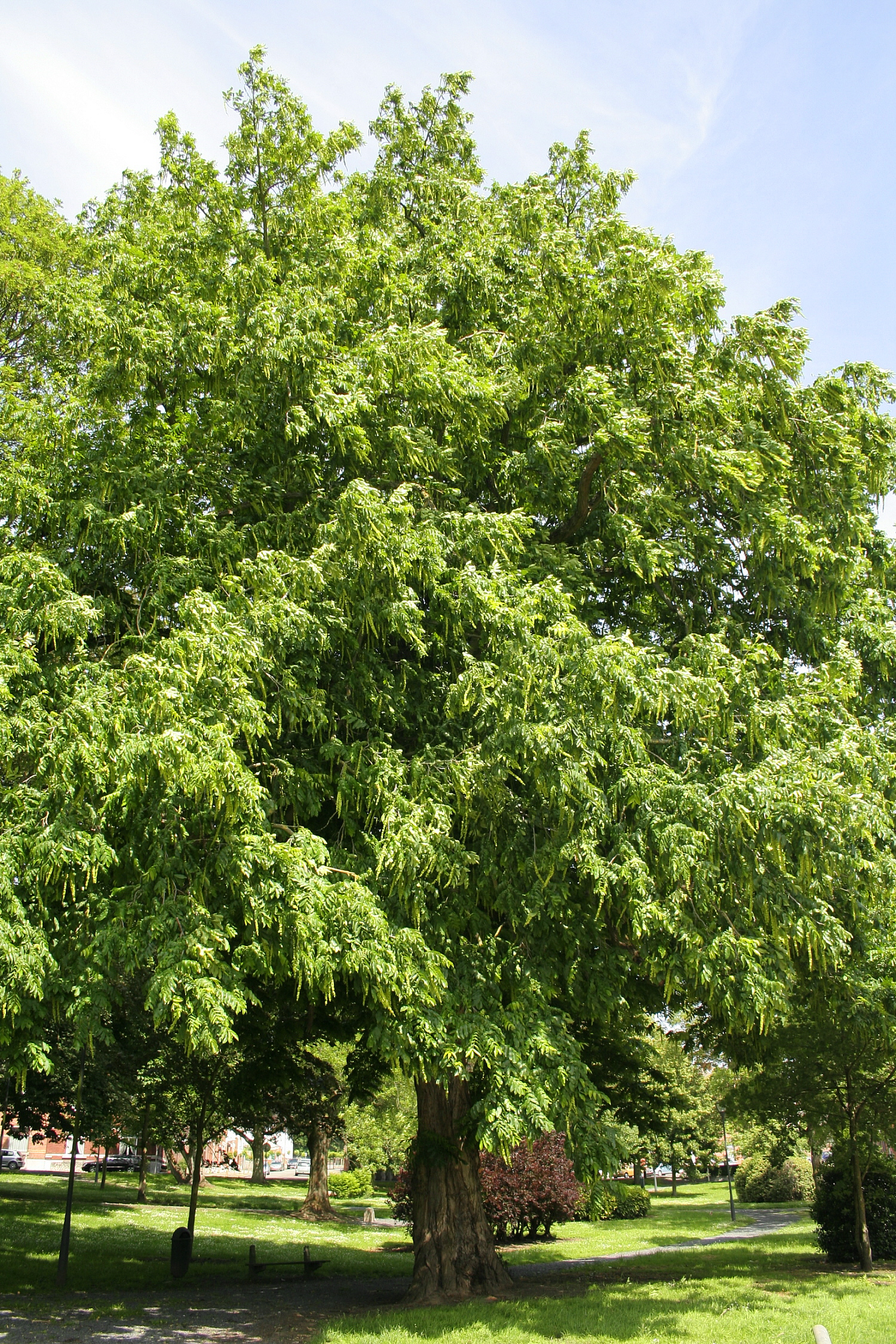
Caucasian wingnut tree

The tree is monoecious and grows to a height of < 30 m, the short, thick bole supporting widely spreading branches to form a rounded structure, not unlike the wych elm. The pinnate leaves can exceed 60 cm in length, comprising 7 - 27 sessile leaflets. The flowers appear in April, the male catkins thick and green, 7.5 – 12.5 cm long, the females longer with less dense flowers, bearing red styles forming fruiting catkins 30 – 50 cm long, the green, winged, nuts approximately 1.8 cm wide.

== Ecology ==
The species is fast growing and grows best on flat ground or shallow slopes near river banks and in deep moist soils. The climate associated with the distribution of this tree includes mild winters and mild humid summers. It generally grows in mixed stands with other species and rarely grows in pure stands.

== Fossil record ==
Fossils of Pterocarya fraxinifolia have been described from the fossil flora of Kızılcahamam district in Turkey, which is of early Pliocene age.
