= Chinese hickory =

Chinese hickory is a common name for several plants and may refer to:

- Annamocarya sinensis, native to southwestern China and northern Vietnam
- Carya cathayensis
