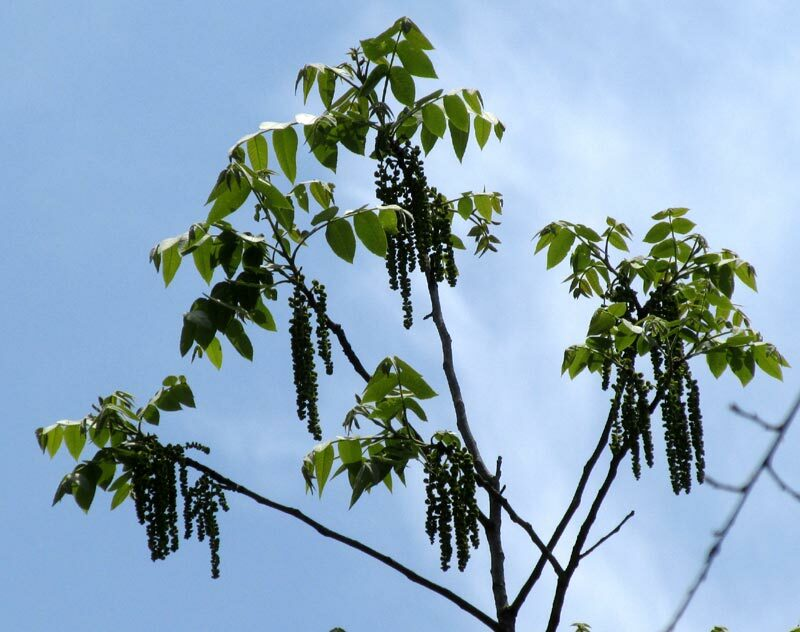

Conservation status
- Vulnerable (IUCN 3.1)

Scientific classification
- Kingdom: Plantae
- Clade: Embryophytes
- Clade: Tracheophytes
- Clade: Angiosperms
- Clade: Eudicots
- Clade: Rosids
- Order: Fagales
- Family: Juglandaceae
- Genus: Carya
- Species: C. palmeri

Binomial name
- Carya palmeri W.E.Manning

= Carya palmeri =

Species of flowering plant

Carya palmeri, the Mexican hickory, is a tree species native to eastern Mexico. It was first described by Wayne Eyer Manning. Carya palmeri is part of the genus Carya, and the family Juglandaceae.

The species was described by Wayne Eyer Manning in 1949.

== Range and habitat ==
Carya palmeri is endemic to Mexico and native to the Sierra Madre Oriental of Hidalgo, Nuevo León, Oaxaca, Querétaro, San Luis Potosí, Tamaulipas, and Veracruz states. It grows in montane pine and oak forests and cloud forest from 1,000 to 2,400 meters elevation. The tree grows on steep slopes, often in association with Carya myristiciformis.
