= Carya poilanei =

Scientific classification
- Kingdom: Plantae
- Clade: Tracheophytes
- Clade: Angiosperms
- Clade: Eudicots
- Clade: Rosids
- Order: Fagales
- Family: Juglandaceae
- Genus: Carya
- Section: Carya sect. Sinocarya
- Species: C. poilanei

Binomial name
- Carya poilanei (A.Chev.) Leroy

Synonyms
- Juglans poilanei A.Chev.

Species of flowering plant

Carya poilanei is a very large species of hickory native to northern Laos, northern Vietnam, Thailand, and southern China. It was first described by Auguste Jean Baptiste Chevalier, and given its current name by André Leroy. Carya poilanei is part of the genus Carya, and the family Juglandaceae.

== Description ==
The species grows up to 15 to 40 meters tall. It is deciduous and monoecious.

== Habitat ==
The species grows on southeastern and southern slopes of limestone or calcareous mountains at elevations of 1000 to 2050 meters.

== Range ==
Prior to 2021, it was only known from Laos and Vietnam (and a previously undocumented specimen collected in Thailand). Its original localities had been affected by repeated deforestation events, and it was thus not observed in these sites for over 63 years, raising fears that it had been driven to extinction. However, in 2021, three fragmented subpopulations of this species were discovered on the eastern edge of the Ailao Mountains in Yunnan Province, China. The populations contained about 50 total adult trees, some gigantic in size, as well as some seedlings and saplings. These populations are located relatively close to villages, but the trees are considered sacred by villagers due to their large size and are thus not at risk of being cut down. Due to its very low population and fragmented distribution, it has been recommended that this species be classified as Critically Endangered on the IUCN Red List.
