= Carya washingtonensis =

Carya washingtonensis Temporal range: Langhian

Scientific classification
- Kingdom: Plantae
- Clade: Tracheophytes
- Clade: Angiosperms
- Clade: Eudicots
- Clade: Rosids
- Order: Fagales
- Family: Juglandaceae
- Genus: Carya
- Section: Carya sect. Carya
- Species: C. washingtonensis

Binomial name
- Carya washingtonensis Manchester, 1987

Extinct species of tree

Carya washingtonensis is an extinct species of hickory nut in the walnut family Juglandaceae. It was identified solely from the Miocene sediments exposed in Kittitas County near Ellensburg, Washington.

== Type locality ==
The species was described from the three nut specimens, all found at the no-longer-accessible Badger Pocket-Squaw Creek locality south of Ellensburg, which is now part of the Yakima Training Center. This locality is thought to be an extension of the Ginkgo Flow basalts, notable for the fossils found at Ginkgo Petrified Forest State Park. The Ginkgo Flow, part of the Wanapum basalts is the oldest segment of the Frenchman Springs Member, dating to around 15.6 million years old, or the Langhian stage of the Miocene.

The nuts were originally discovered as a single silicified, opalized mass of well over fifty nuts found in a petrified Platanus stump. The mass was found in the 1940s by Carl Clinesmith but as of 1987 the mass is lost; Steven Manchester presumes it was disaggregated with the individual nuts disseminated to various collections. However it is reported in a 1995 Washington Geology article by Wesley Wehr the specimen was, at that time, on display at the Burke Museum of Natural History and Culture, part of the University of Washington in Seattle, Washington, USA. At least a portion of the mass is still preserved in the collections at the Burke Museum as specimen number "UWBM38700".

== History and classification ==
Carya washingtonensis was described from three type specimens, the holotype, number "HU60073A", and two paratypes, numbers "HU60073B" and "IU5343". Both the holotype and one paratype are preserved in the paleobotanical collections housed at the Harvard University Biology Laboratories. The second paratype is deposited in the paleobotanical collections in the Indiana university, Department of Geology.

The specimens were studied by paleobotanist Steven R. Manchester, currently of the Florida State University Department of Geology as part of his PhD dissertation and was accepted for publication in 1984. Steven Manchester published his 1987 type description for C. washingtonensis in the journal Monographs in Systematic Botany. The chosen specific name washingtonensis, in reference to Washington state where only known specimens of the species have been recovered.

== Description ==
The nuts of Carya washingtonensis are globose in shape, with a smooth to slightly wrinkled surface. They show four faintly developed angles at the apex. The nuts range in size but are all within 18–20 millimetres (0.71–0.79 in) in length and 14–19 millimetres (0.55–0.75 in) in width. While the preservation quality varies, the silicification in a number of the specimens was enough to allow examination of the internal anatomy. In general the nut wall and septa are approximately 1.5 millimetres (0.059 in) thick without and do not have lacunae but do possess a secondary septum. The locule is divided into four compartments basally with inner ribs that are well developed and containing vascular bundles and the placentary bundles of primary septum arch out peripherally.

When described by Steven Manchester, the mass was interpreted to represent a Miocene rodent nut cache and was the oldest known at that time. Since then a slightly older cache was discovered in Germany. The German cache of Castanopsis fruits was found in a preserved sand dune dating to the Burdigalian stage of the Miocene, making it slightly older than the Carya washingtonensis cache.
