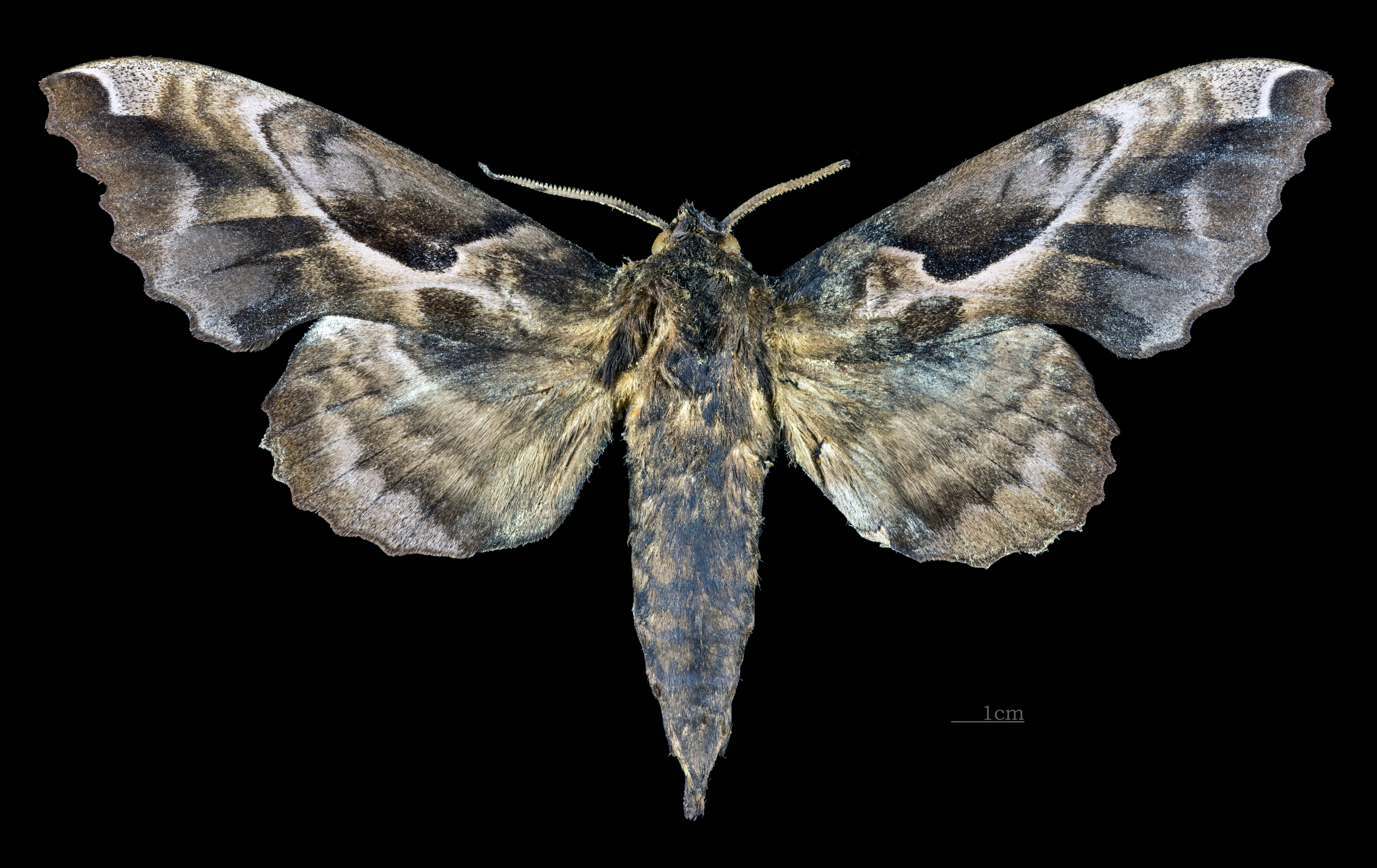
- Male P. d. dissimilis, dorsal view
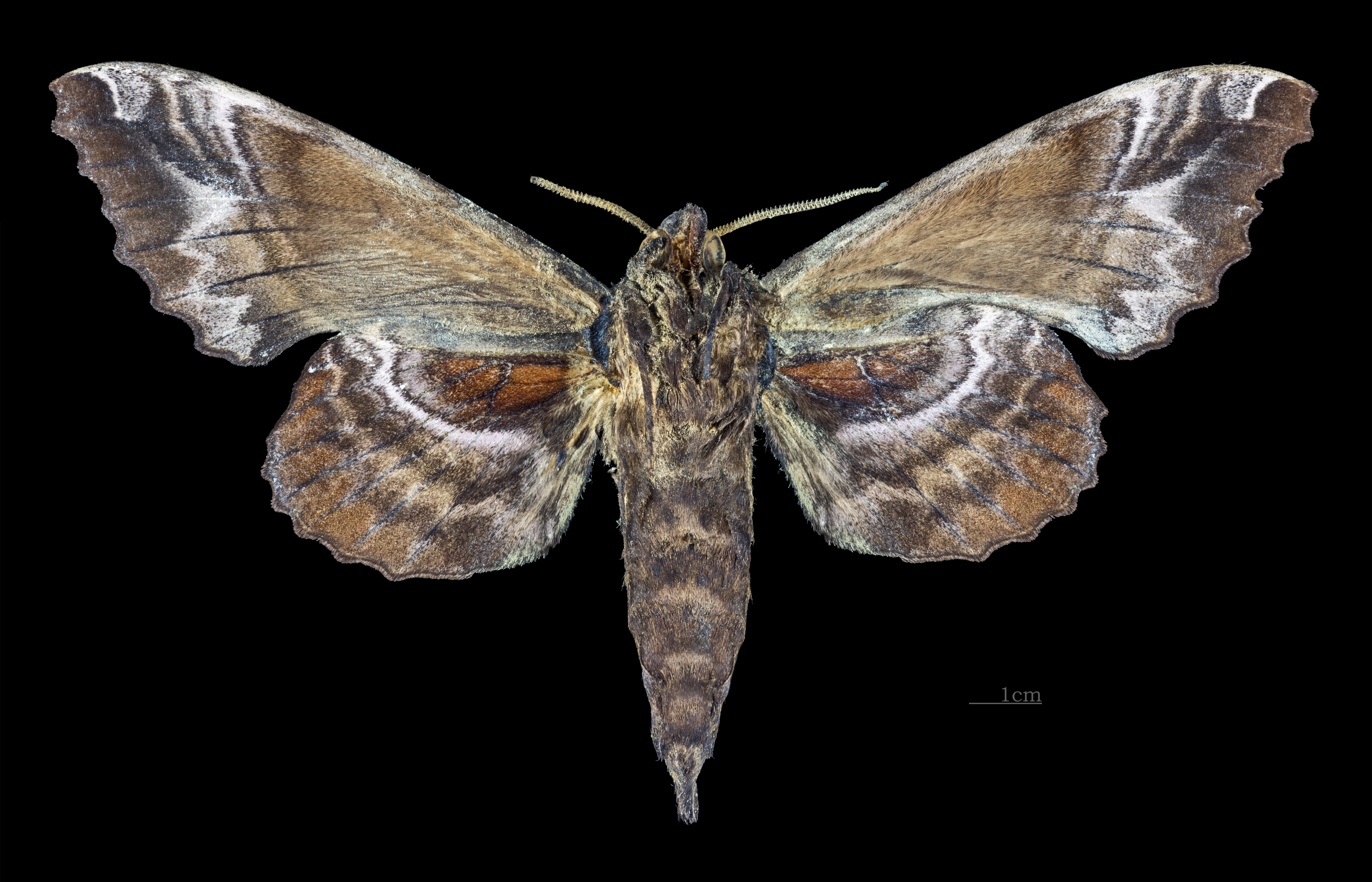
- Male P. d. dissimilis, ventral view

Scientific classification
- Kingdom: Animalia
- Phylum: Arthropoda
- Class: Insecta
- Order: Lepidoptera
- Family: Sphingidae
- Tribe: Mimatini
- Genus: Phyllosphingia; C. Swinhoe, 1897
- Species: P. dissimilis

Binomial name
- Phyllosphingia dissimilis (Bremer, 1861)

Synonyms
- Clarkia Tutt, 1902; Clarkunella Strand, 1943; Triptogon dissimilis Bremer, 1861; Phyllosphingia dissimilis hoenei Clark, 1937; Phyllosphingia dissimilis jordani Bryk, 1946; Phyllosphingia dissimilis sinensis Jordan, 1911

= Phyllosphingia =

Genus of moths

Phyllosphingia is a monotypic moth genus in the family Sphingidae erected by Charles Swinhoe in 1897. Its only species, Phyllosphingia dissimilis, the buff-leaf hawkmoth, was described by Otto Vasilievich Bremer in 1861.

== Distribution ==
It is known from the south-eastern Russian Far East, eastern and central China, Taiwan, the Korean Peninsula and Japan. There is also a record from Luzon in the Philippines. Subspecies P. d. perundulans is found from Nepal, east through north-eastern India, Myanmar and northern Thailand to southwestern China. The habitat consists of open parklands and forest edges.

== Description ==
The wingspan is 93–130 mm.

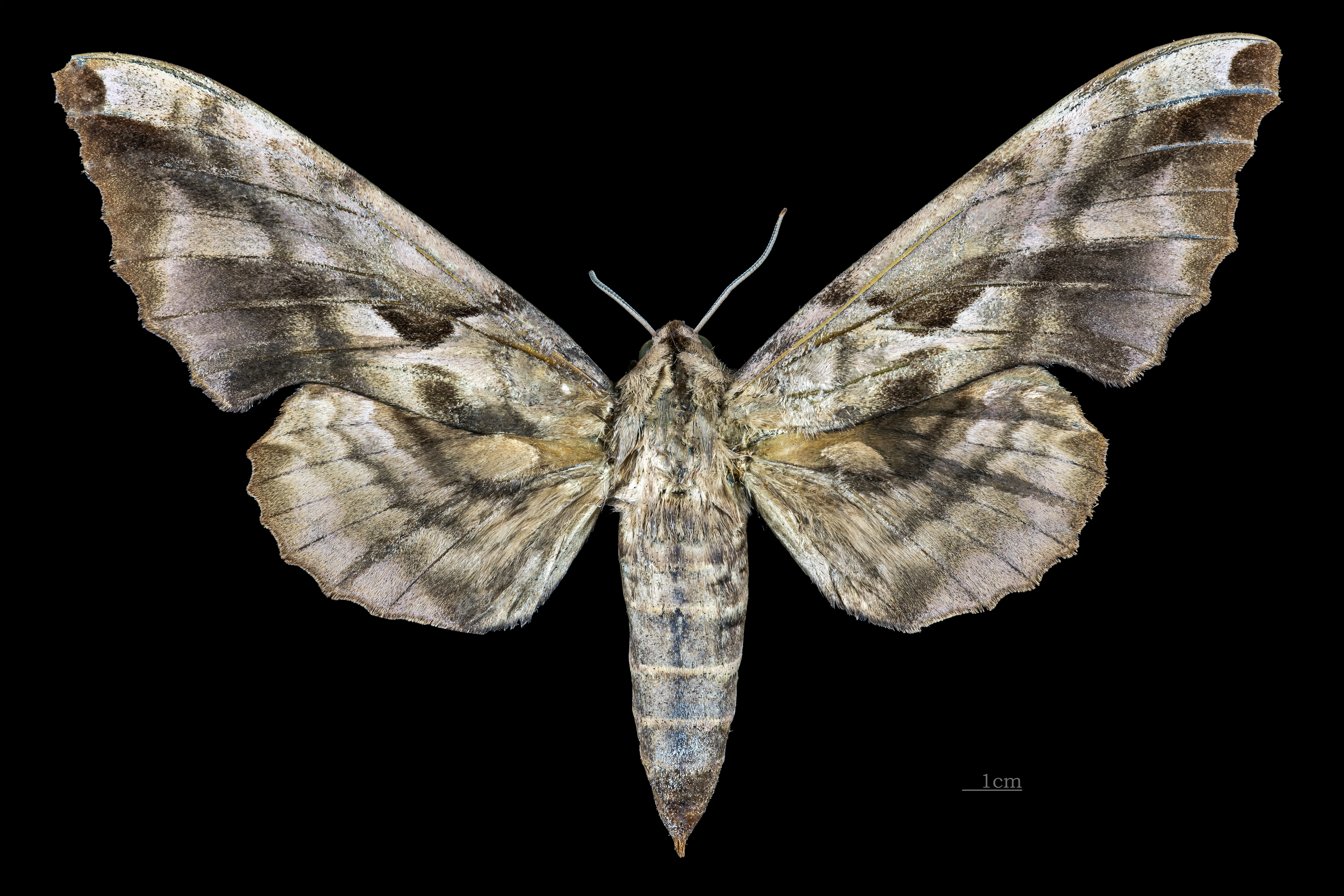
Female, dorsal view

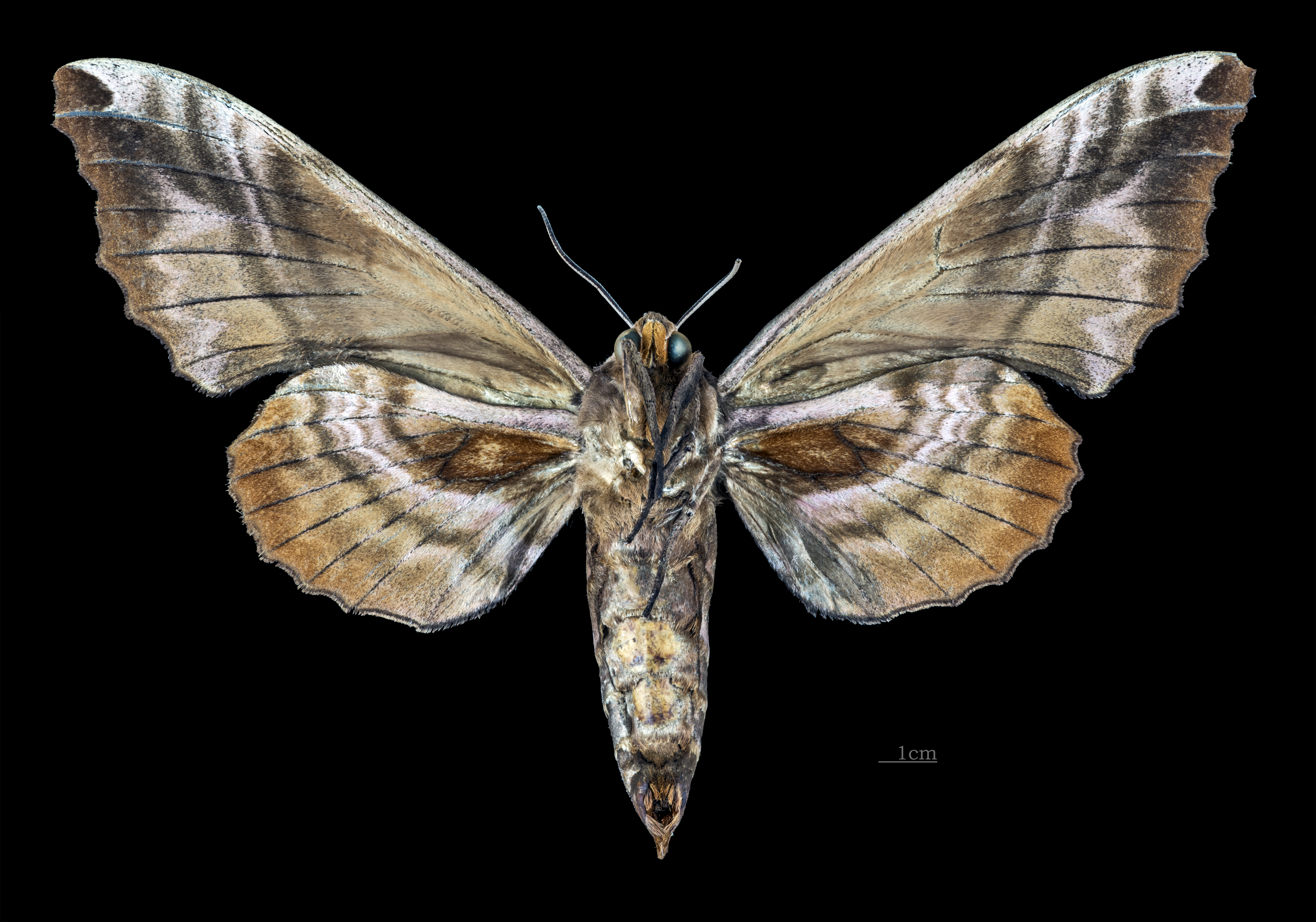
Female, ventral view

== Biology ==
There is one generation per year in northern China, with adults on wing from May to July. Farther south, there are two generations. Adults have been recorded from mid-May to mid-August in Korea.

The larvae have been recorded feeding on Carya cathayensis, Juglans mandschurica and Juglans regia in China, Juglans mandschurica in Primorskiy Kray and Prunus serrulata var. spontanea in Korea.

== Subspecies ==
- Phyllosphingia dissimilis dissimilis (south-eastern Russian Far East, eastern and central China, Taiwan, the Korean Peninsula and Japan. There is also a record from Luzon)
- Phyllosphingia dissimilis perundulans C. Swinhoe, 1897 (from Nepal, east through north-eastern India, Myanmar and northern Thailand to southwestern China)
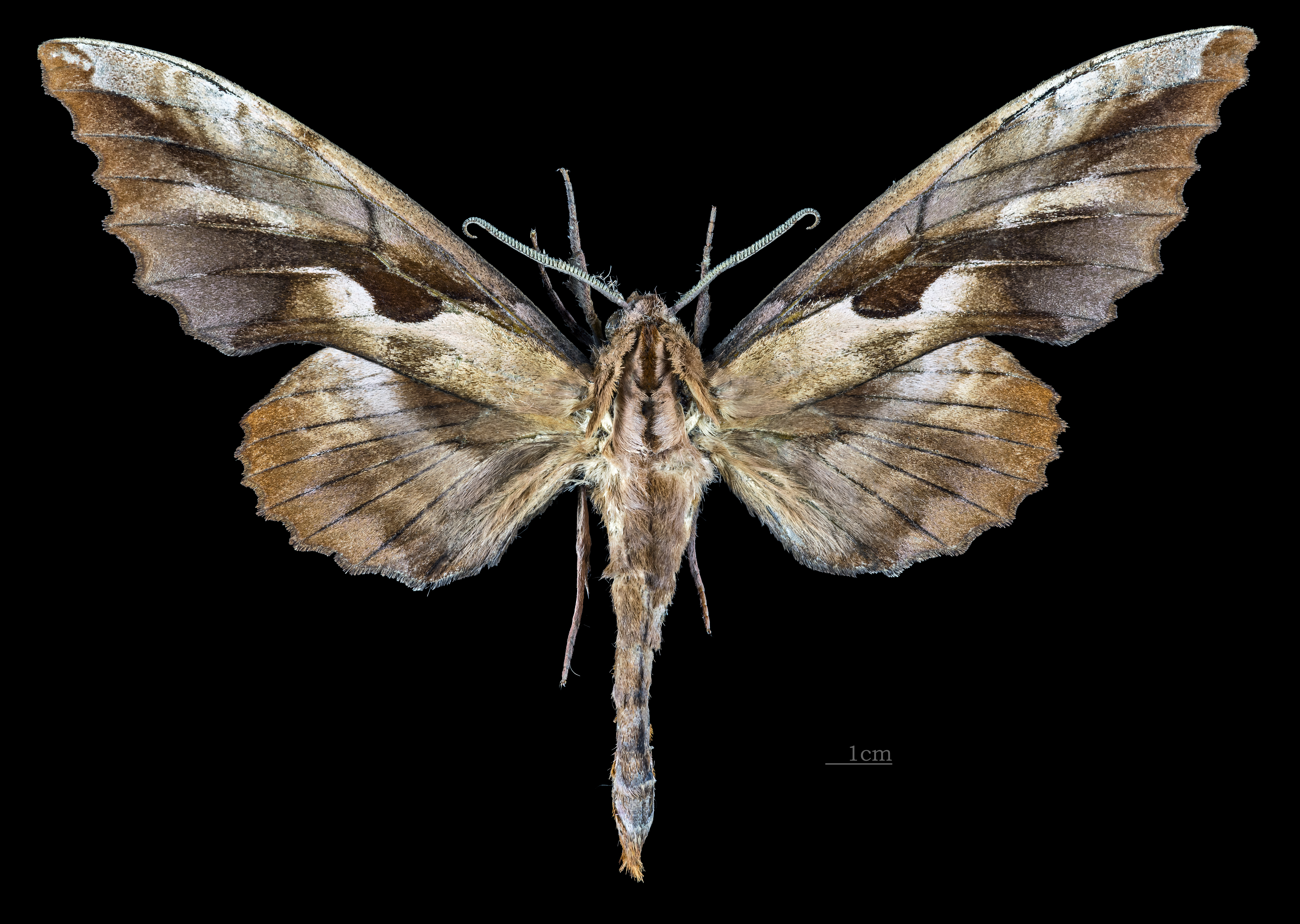
Male P. d. perundulans, dorsal view

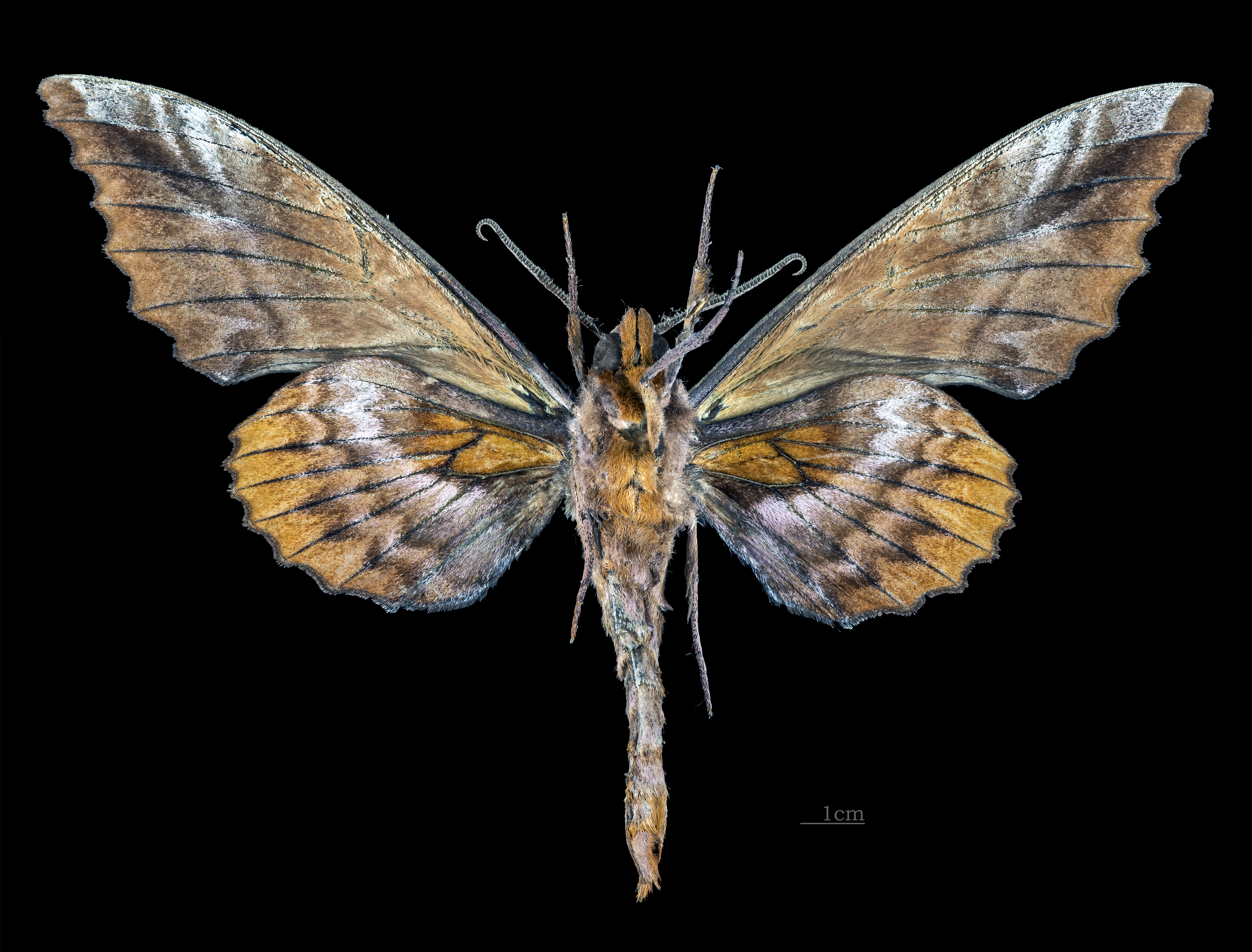
Male P. d. perundulans, ventral view
