= André Leroy =

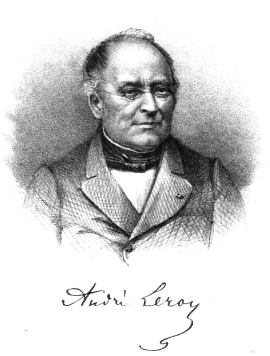
André Leroy

André Leroy (born 30 August 1801 in Angers; died 23 July 1875) was a French botanist and nurseryman.

== Biography ==
He was born into a large family of gardeners. He took over the management of the family farm, founded in 1780, in 1822. When he died, his company employed 300 workers on 200 hectares of plantation. He established the most important nursery in Europe. The Leroy nursery was bought twice (in 1910 and 1930), by the horticulturalist René Levavasseur.

He became municipal councilor of the city of Angers from 1840 to 1845 and from 1848 to 1870.

On 1 July 1851, André Leroy's daughter Marie Léonide Leroy married the Angevin painter Eugène Appert.

He also became a politician.

In 1859, André Leroy was in charge of developing a garden on the Angers mall. On 15 May 1859 the new garden opened to the public. The mall garden quickly became one of the busiest places in Angers.

André Leroy is buried in the cemetery of the East, in Angers.
