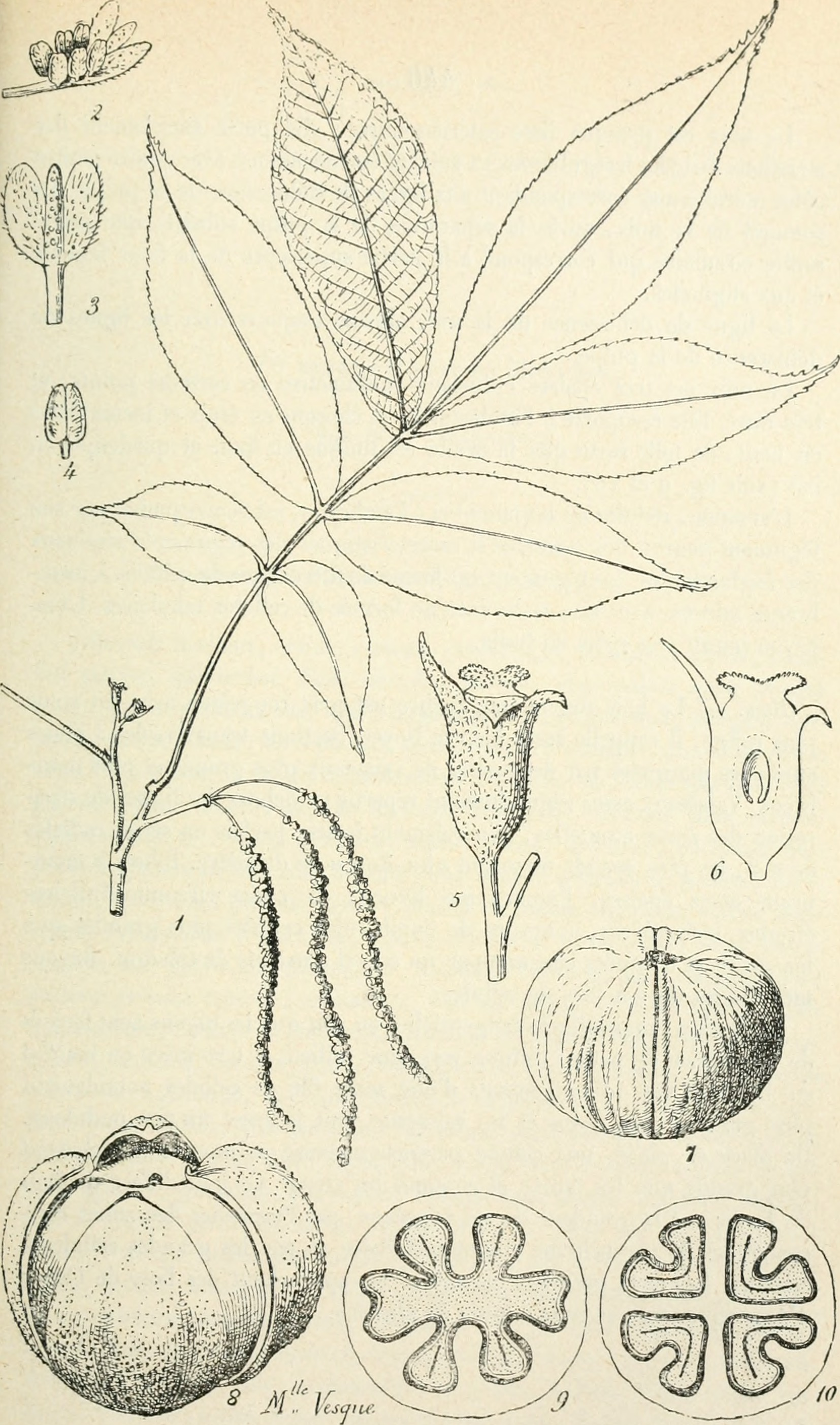
- Botanical illustration

Scientific classification
- Kingdom: Plantae
- Clade: Tracheophytes
- Clade: Angiosperms
- Clade: Eudicots
- Clade: Rosids
- Order: Fagales
- Family: Juglandaceae
- Genus: Carya
- Section: Carya sect. Sinocarya
- Species: C. tonkinensis

Binomial name
- Carya tonkinensis Lecomte

= Carya tonkinensis =

Species of plant in the genus Carya

Carya tonkinensis, the Vietnam hickory, is a species of flowering plant in the genus Carya native to Assam in India, southern China, and northern Indochina. Local people harvest the wood for timber and furniture making, and collect the edible nuts for vegetable oil production.
