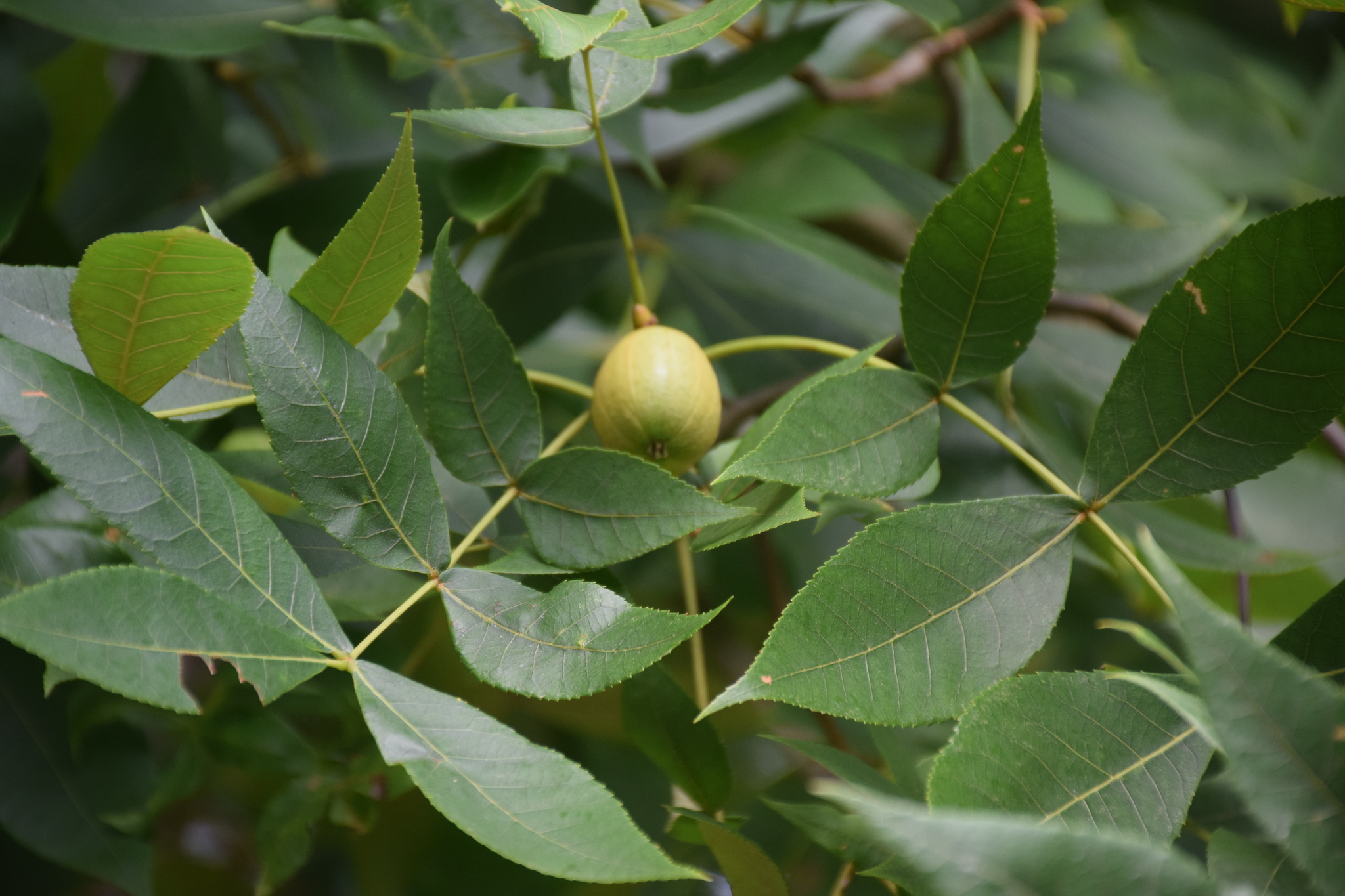

Conservation status
- Least Concern (IUCN 3.1)

- Apparently Secure (NatureServe)

Scientific classification
- Kingdom: Plantae
- Clade: Embryophytes
- Clade: Tracheophytes
- Clade: Angiosperms
- Clade: Eudicots
- Clade: Rosids
- Order: Fagales
- Family: Juglandaceae
- Genus: Carya
- Section: Carya sect. Carya
- Species: C. texana

Binomial name
- Carya texana Buckley (1861)
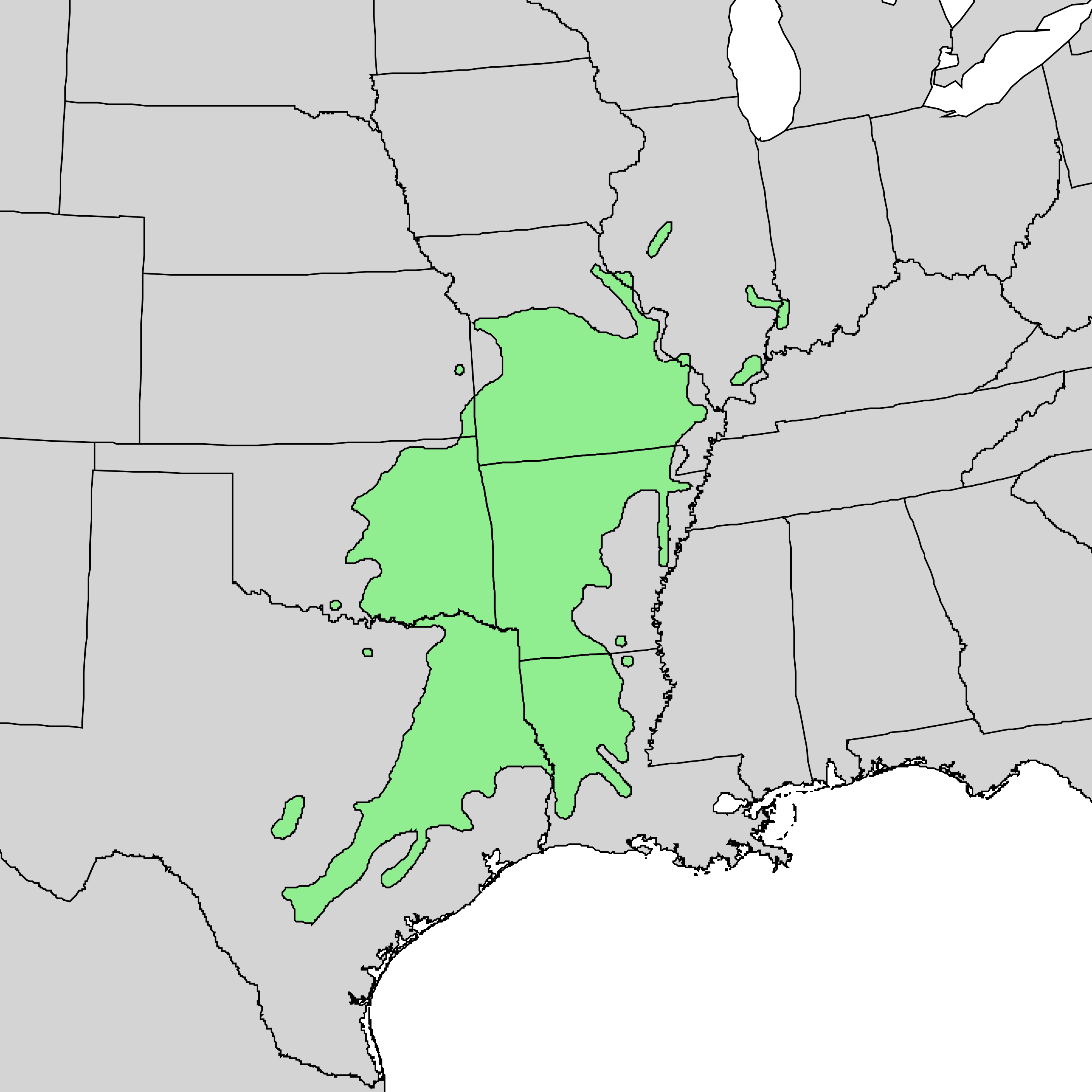
- Natural range of Carya texana

Synonyms
- List: Carya arkansana Sarg.; Carya buckleyi Durand; Carya glabra var. villosa (Sarg.) B.L.Rob.; Carya texana var. arkansana (Sarg.) Little; Carya texana f. glabra E.J.Palmer & Steyerm.; Carya texana f. pachylemma Sarg.; Carya texana var. villosa (Sarg.) Little; Carya villosa (Sarg.) C.K.Schneid.; Hicoria arkansana (Sarg.) Ashe; Hicoria glabra var. villosa Sarg.; Hicoria pallida var. arkansana (Sarg.) Ashe; Hicoria villosa (Sarg.) Ashe; Hicorius arkansana Ashe; Hicorius buckleyi Ashe

= Carya texana =

Black hickory

Species of tree

Carya texana (called black hickory for its dark colored bark, or Texas hickory) is a North American tree in the walnut family, Juglandaceae. It is endemic to the United States, found primarily in the southern Great Plains and the Lower Mississippi Valley. It is an endangered species in Indiana, where it occurs in the southwest corner of the state.

== Description ==
Black hickory grows up to 41 m (135 ft) tall. It has dark gray to black bark with a tight "diamond" patterning. The leaves usually have a dense coating of scales, imparting a rusty brown color. They are pinnately compound usually with seven leaflets, but sometimes five or nine. The fruits (nuts) are bronze to reddish brown and the seeds can be sweet and edible, but are sometimes bitter.

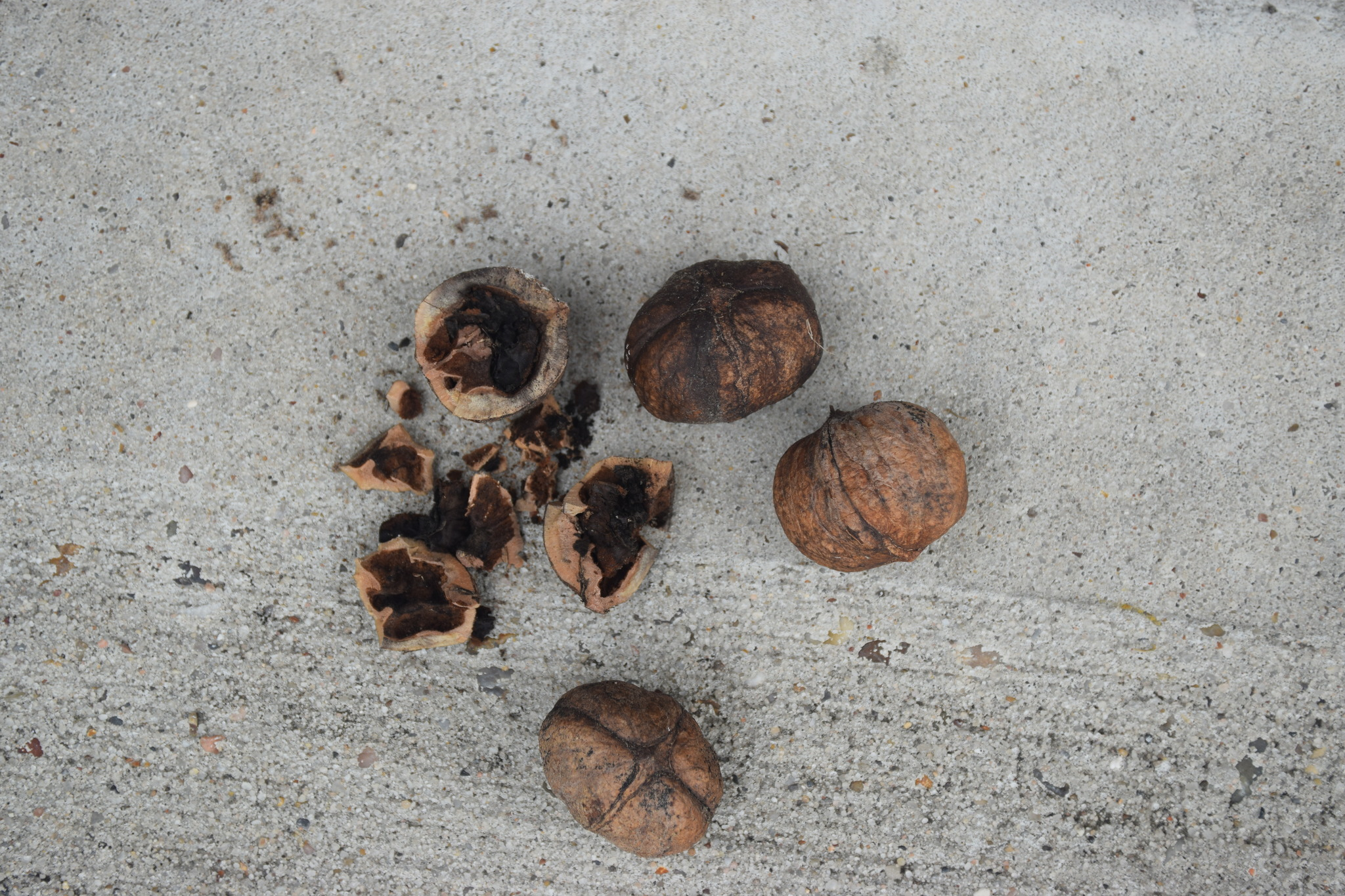
Black hickory nuts

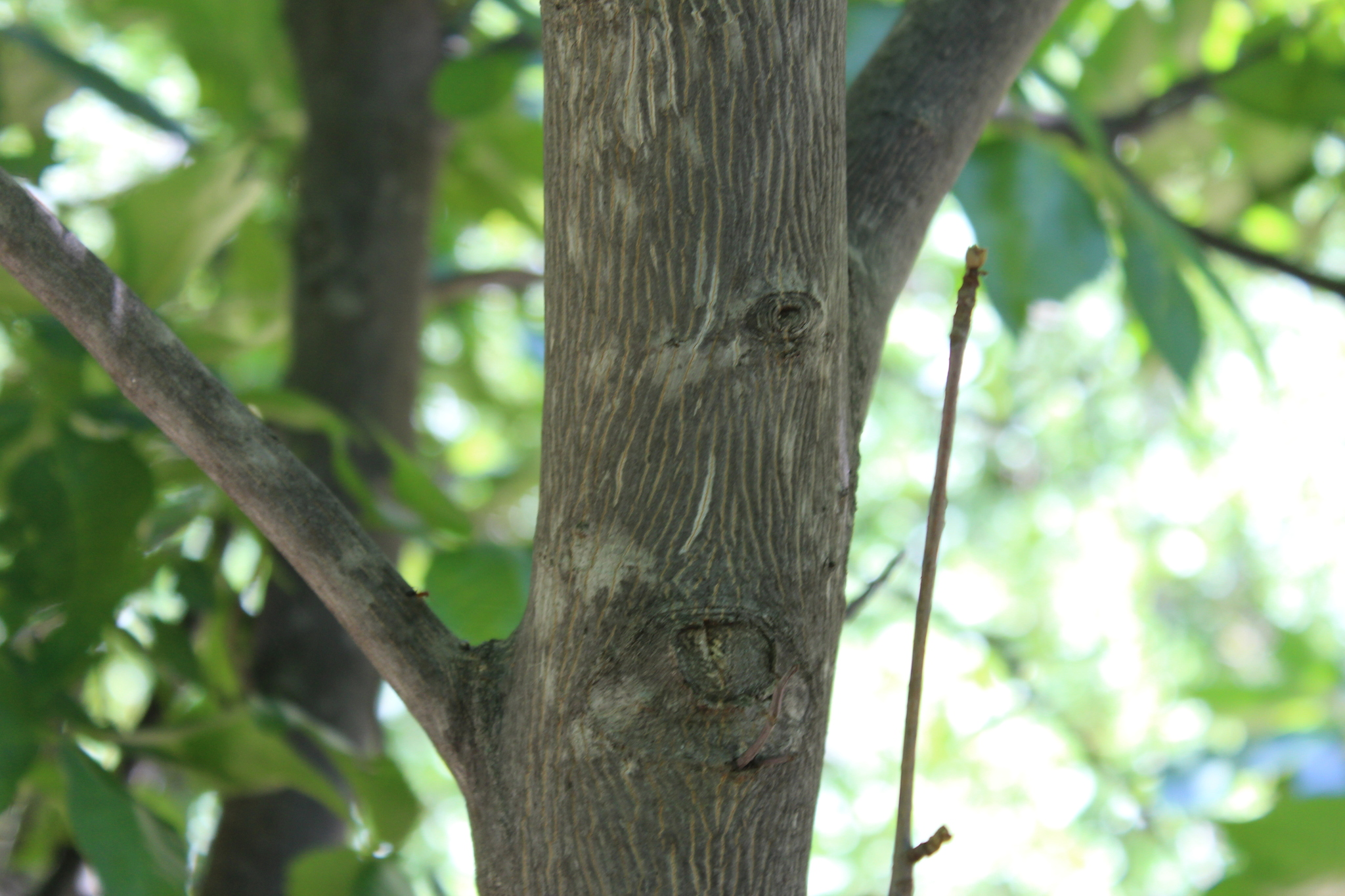
Bark on a young branch

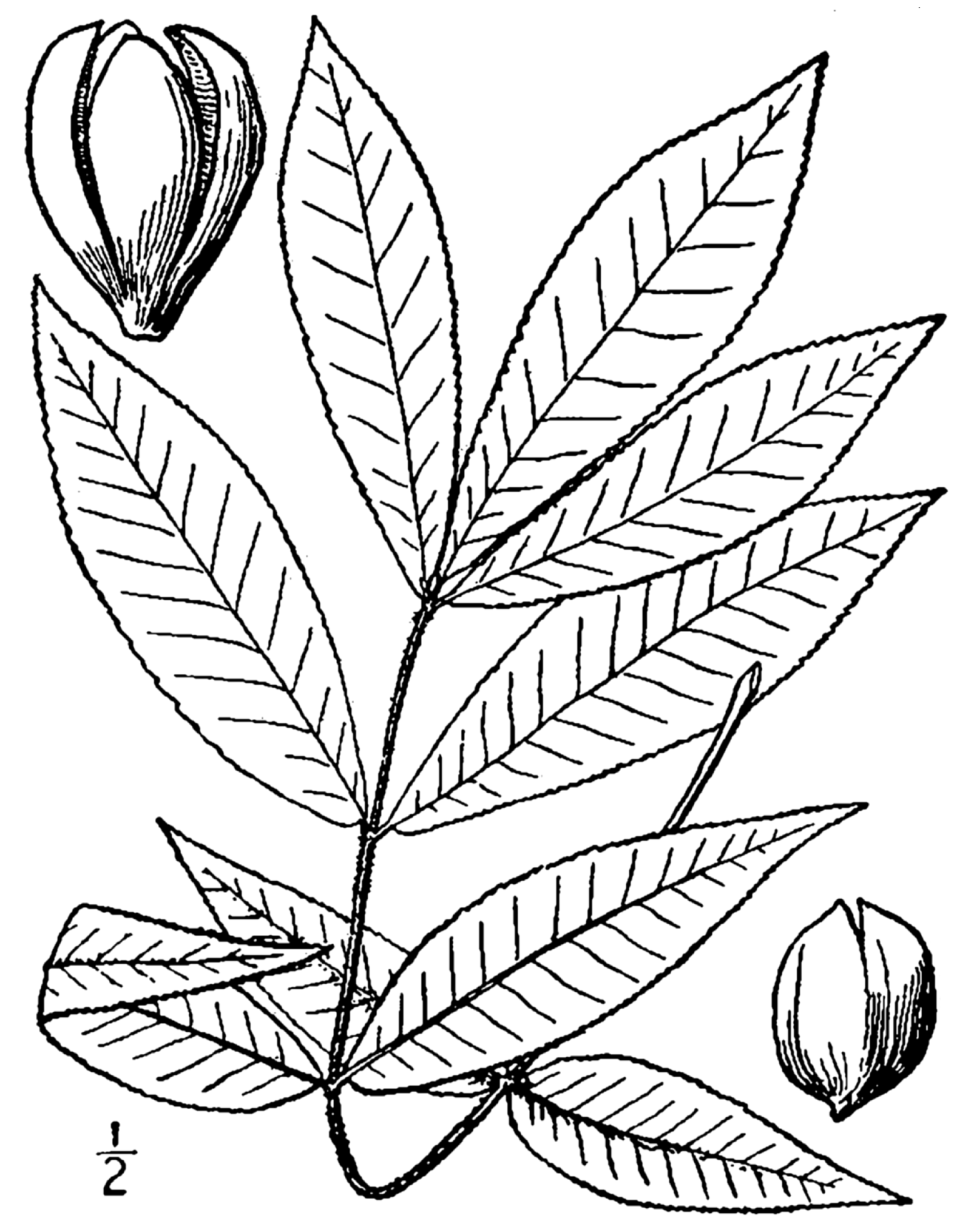
Illustration from Britton and Brown (1913)

== Genetics ==
Black hickory is a 64-chromosome species that readily hybridizes with tetraploid C. tomentosa. Hybrids with 32 chromosomes may also occur.
