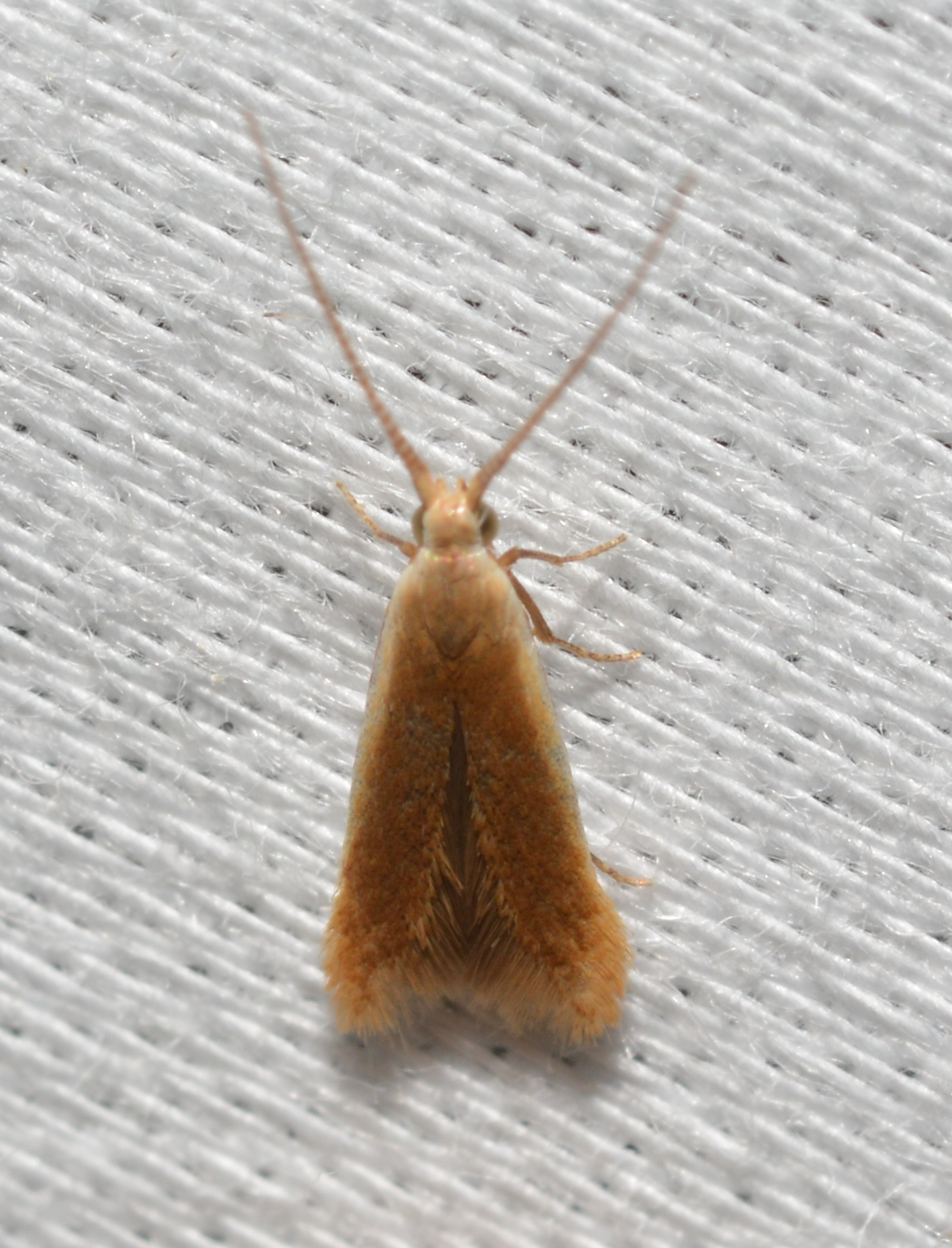

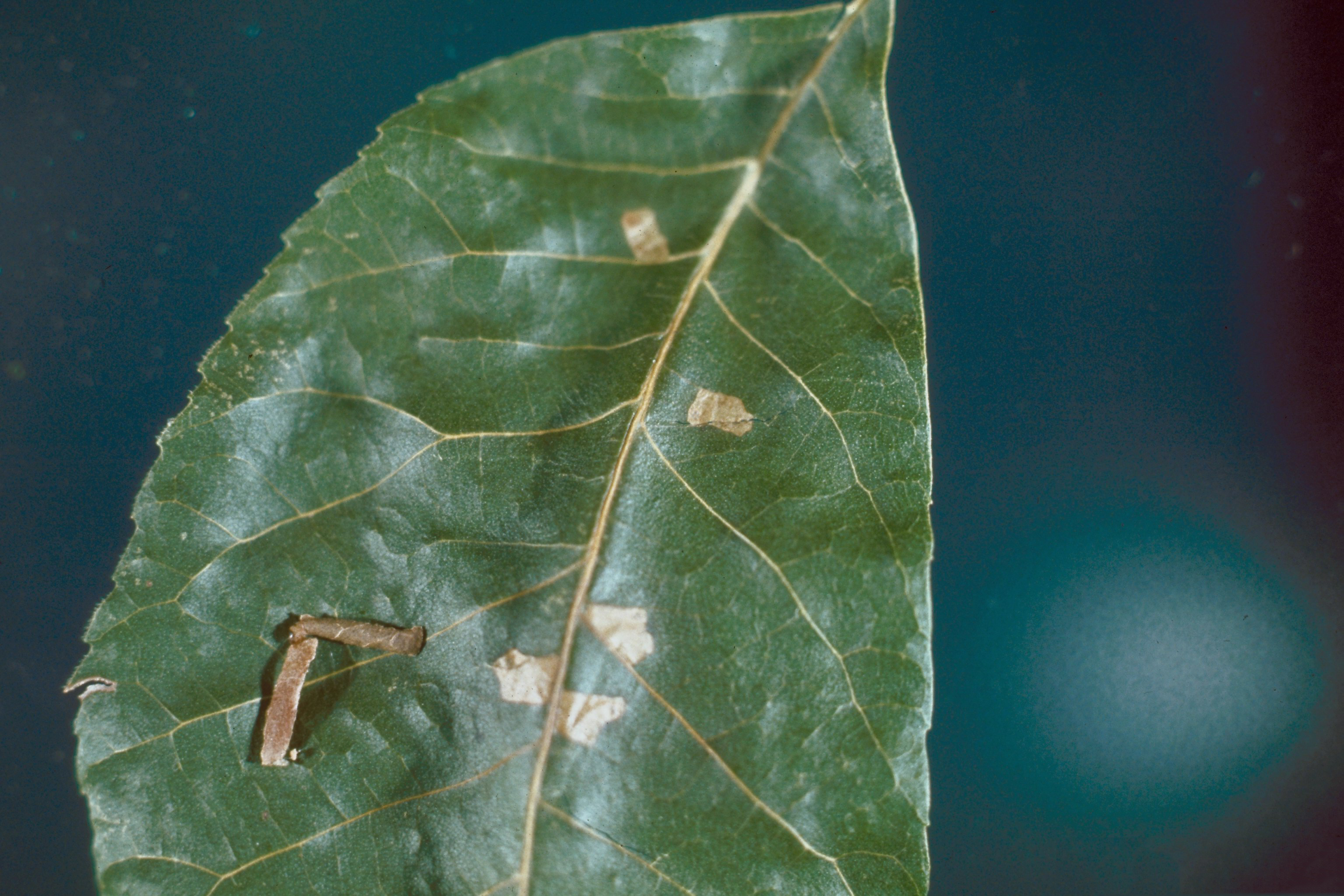
- Adult (top) and larva in case (bottom)

Scientific classification
- Kingdom: Animalia
- Phylum: Arthropoda
- Clade: Pancrustacea
- Class: Insecta
- Order: Lepidoptera
- Family: Coleophoridae
- Genus: Coleophora
- Species: C. laticornella

Binomial name
- Coleophora laticornella Clemens, 1860

Synonyms
- Coleophora caryaefoliella Clemens, 1862

= Coleophora laticornella =

Species of moth

Coleophora laticornella, the pecan cigar casebearer, is a species of moth in the family Coleophoridae. It is found in North America.

The wingspan is about 25 mm.

The larvae feed on Carya illinoinensis and other species in the genus Carya, as well as on Juglans nigra and Prunus americana. The larvae create a spatulate leaf case.
