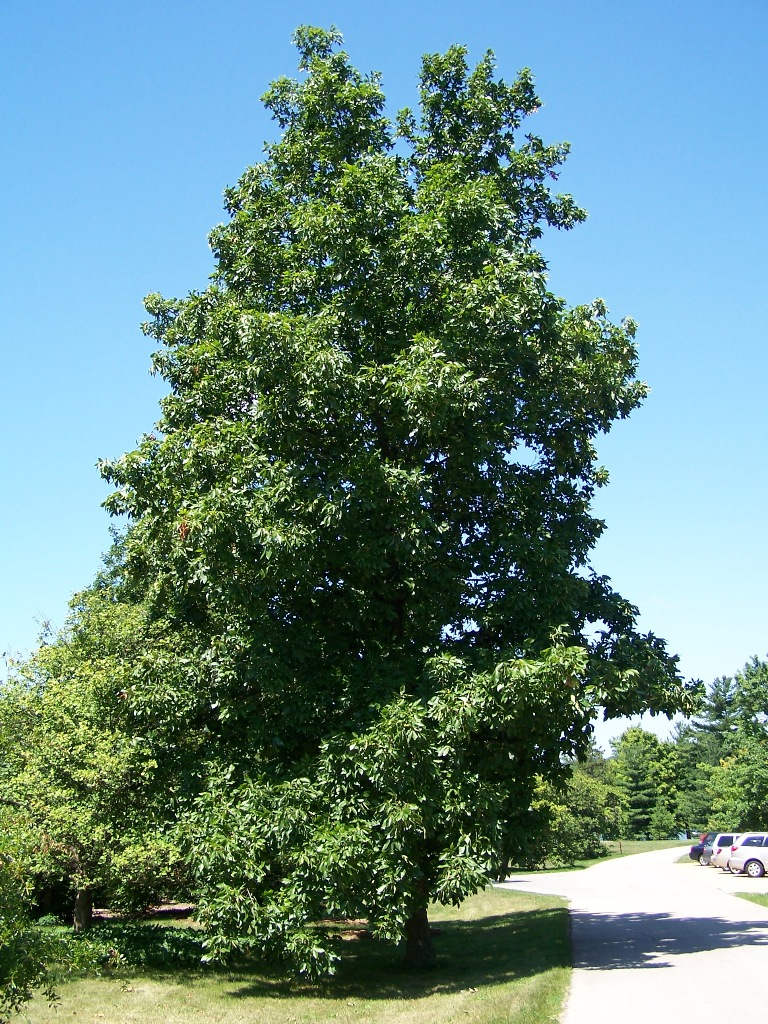
- Hickory at Morton Arboretum; Accession 29-U-10

Scientific classification
- Kingdom: Plantae
- Clade: Tracheophytes
- Clade: Angiosperms
- Clade: Eudicots
- Clade: Rosids
- Order: Fagales
- Family: Juglandaceae
- Subfamily: Juglandoideae
- Tribe: Juglandeae
- Subtribe: Caryinae
- Genus: Carya; Nutt.

Type species
- Carya tomentosa (Poir.) Nutt.

Synonyms
- Annamocarya A.Chev.; Hicoria Raf., orth. var.; Hicorius Raf., nom. rej.; Juglandicarya E.Reid & M.Chandler; Rhamphocarya Kuang; Scoria Raf. ex Kuntze, nom. illeg. superfl.; Scorias Raf. ex Endl.

= Hickory =

Hickory Temporal range: 85.8–0 Ma Late Cretaceous - present

Genus of trees

Hickory is a common name for trees composing the genus Carya, which includes 19 species accepted by Plants of the World Online.

Seven species are native to Southeast Asia in China, Indochina, and northeastern India (Assam), and twelve are native to North America. A number of hickory species are used for their edible nuts or for their wood.

== Etymology ==
The name "hickory" derives from clipping of the native Algonquian (perhaps Powhatan) word pockerchicory, pocohicora, or something else similar which may be the name for the hickory tree's nut, or may be a milky drink made from such nuts. The genus name Carya is Ancient Greek: κάρυον, káryon, meaning "nut".

== Description ==
Hickories are temperate to subtropical forest trees with pinnately compound leaves and large nuts. Most are deciduous, but one species (C. sinensis, syn. Annamocarya sinensis) in southeast Asia is evergreen.

Hickory flowers are small, yellow-green catkins produced in spring. They are wind-pollinated and self-incompatible. The fruit is a globose or oval nut, 2–5 cm (1–2 in) long and 1.5–3 cm (1/2–1 1/4 in) diameter, enclosed in a four-valved husk, which splits open at maturity. The nut shell is thick and bony in most species, but thin in a few, notably the pecan (C. illinoinensis); it is divided into two halves, which split apart when the seed germinates.

Some fruits are borderline and difficult to categorize. Hickory (Carya) nuts and walnut (Juglans) nuts, both in the family Juglandaceae, grow within an outer husk; these fruits are sometimes considered to be drupes or drupaceous nuts, rather than true botanical nuts. "Tryma" is a specialized term for such nut-like drupes. The Angiosperm Phylogeny Group, however, considers the fruit to be a nut.

== Taxonomy ==
=== Phylogeny ===
The oldest fossils attributed to Carya are Cretaceous pollen grains from Mexico and New Mexico. Fossil and molecular data suggest the genus Carya may have diversified during the Miocene. Modern Carya first appeared in Oligocene strata 34 million years ago. Recent discoveries of Carya fruit fossils further support the hypothesis that the genus has long been a member of Eastern North American landscapes, however, its range has contracted, and Carya is no longer extant west of the Rocky Mountains.

Fossils of early hickory nuts show simpler, thinner shells than modern species, with the exception of pecans, suggesting that the trees gradually developed defenses to rodent seed predation. During this time, the genus had a distribution across the Northern Hemisphere, but the Pleistocene Ice Age, beginning 2 million years ago, obliterated it from Europe. In Anatolia, the genus appears to have disappeared only in the early Holocene, probably related to human disturbance. The distribution of Carya in North America also contracted, and it completely disappeared from the continent west of the Rocky Mountains. It is likely that the genus originated in North America, and later spread to Europe and Asia.

=== Subdivision ===
The genus Carya (not to be confused with Careya in the Lecythidaceae) is in the walnut family, Juglandaceae. In the APG system, this family is included in the order Fagales. Several species are known to hybridize, with around nine accepted, named hybrids.

==== Asian hickories ====
Carya sect. Sinocarya

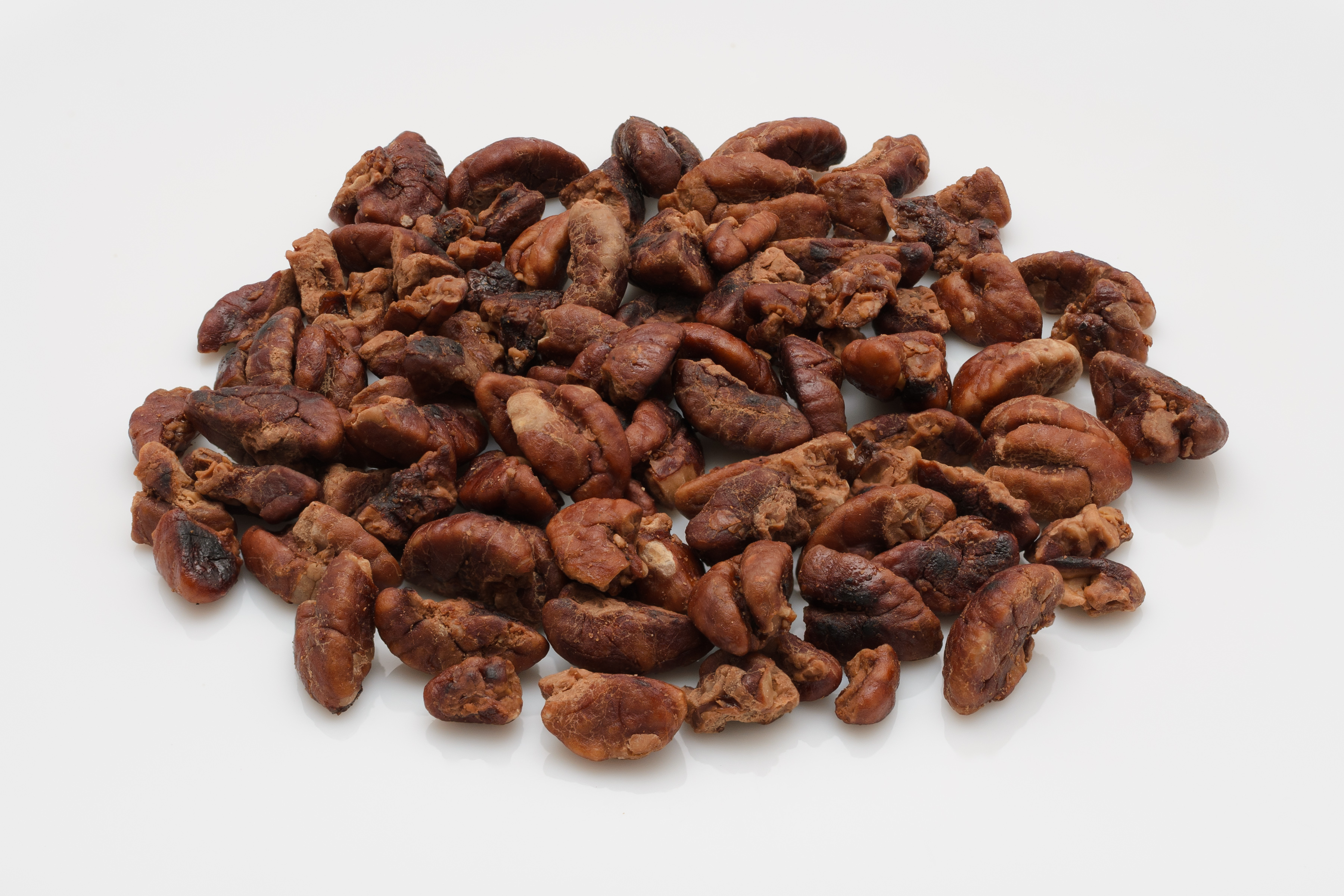
Roasted Carya cathayensis (Chinese hickory)

- Carya dabieshanensis M.C. Liu – Dabie Shan hickory (may be synonymous with C. cathayensis)
- Carya cathayensis Sarg. – Chinese hickory
- Carya hunanensis W.C.Cheng & R.H.Chang – Hunan hickory
- Carya kweichowensis Kuang & A.M.Lu – Guizhou hickory
- Carya luana C.Y.Deng & X.G.Xiang
- Carya luodianensis Yang, Y. B (2026)
- Carya poilanei Leroy – Poilane's hickory
- Carya sinensis Dode – Beaked hickory
- Carya tonkinensis Lecomte – Vietnamese hickory

C. sinensis has sometimes been split out in a separate genus as Annamocarya sinensis, but not by Plants of the World Online, as genetic data support it being embedded within the other Asian Carya.

==== North American hickories ====
Carya sect. Carya – typical hickories

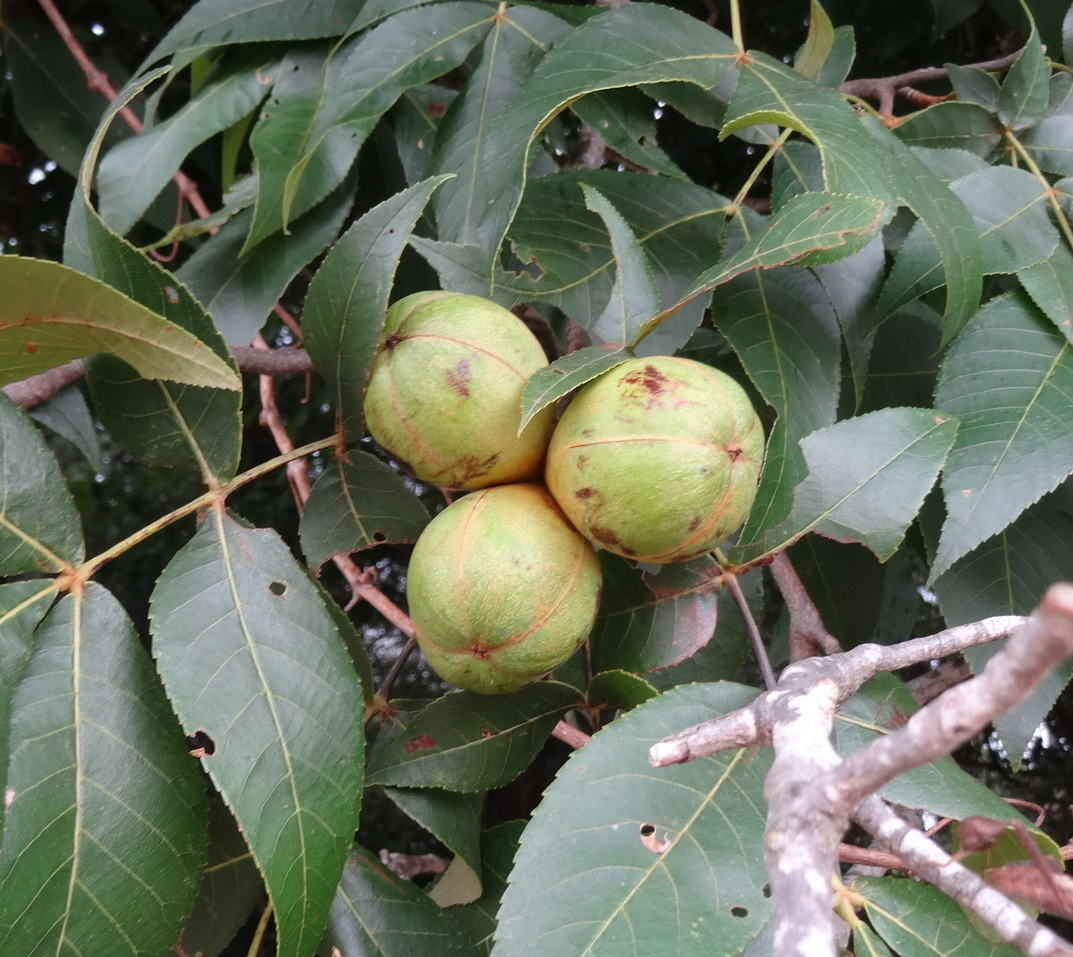
Nuts of Carya texana (black hickory)

- Carya floridana Sarg. – scrub hickory
- Carya glabra (Mill.) Sweet – pignut hickory, pignut, sweet pignut, coast pignut hickory, smoothbark hickory, swamp hickory, broom hickory
- Carya laciniosa (Mill.) K.Koch – shellbark hickory, shagbark hickory, bigleaf shagbark hickory, kingnut, big shellbark, bottom shellbark, thick shellbark, western shellbark
- Carya myristiciformis (F.Michx.) Nutt. – nutmeg hickory, swamp hickory, bitter water hickory
- Carya ovalis (Wangenh.) Sarg. – red hickory, spicebark hickory, sweet pignut hickory (treated as a variety of C. glabra by Flora N. Amer. and Plants of the World Online)
- Carya ovata (Mill.) K.Koch – shagbark hickory
  - C. o. var. ovata – northern shagbark hickory
  - C. o. var. australis – southern shagbark hickory, Carolina hickory (syn. C. carolinae-septentrionalis)
- Carya pallida (Ashe) Engl. & Graebn. – sand hickory
- Carya texana Buckley – black hickory
- Carya tomentosa (Poir.) Nutt. – mockernut hickory (syn. C. alba)
- †Carya washingtonensis Manchester – Miocene of Kittitas County, Washington

Carya sect. Apocarya – pecans

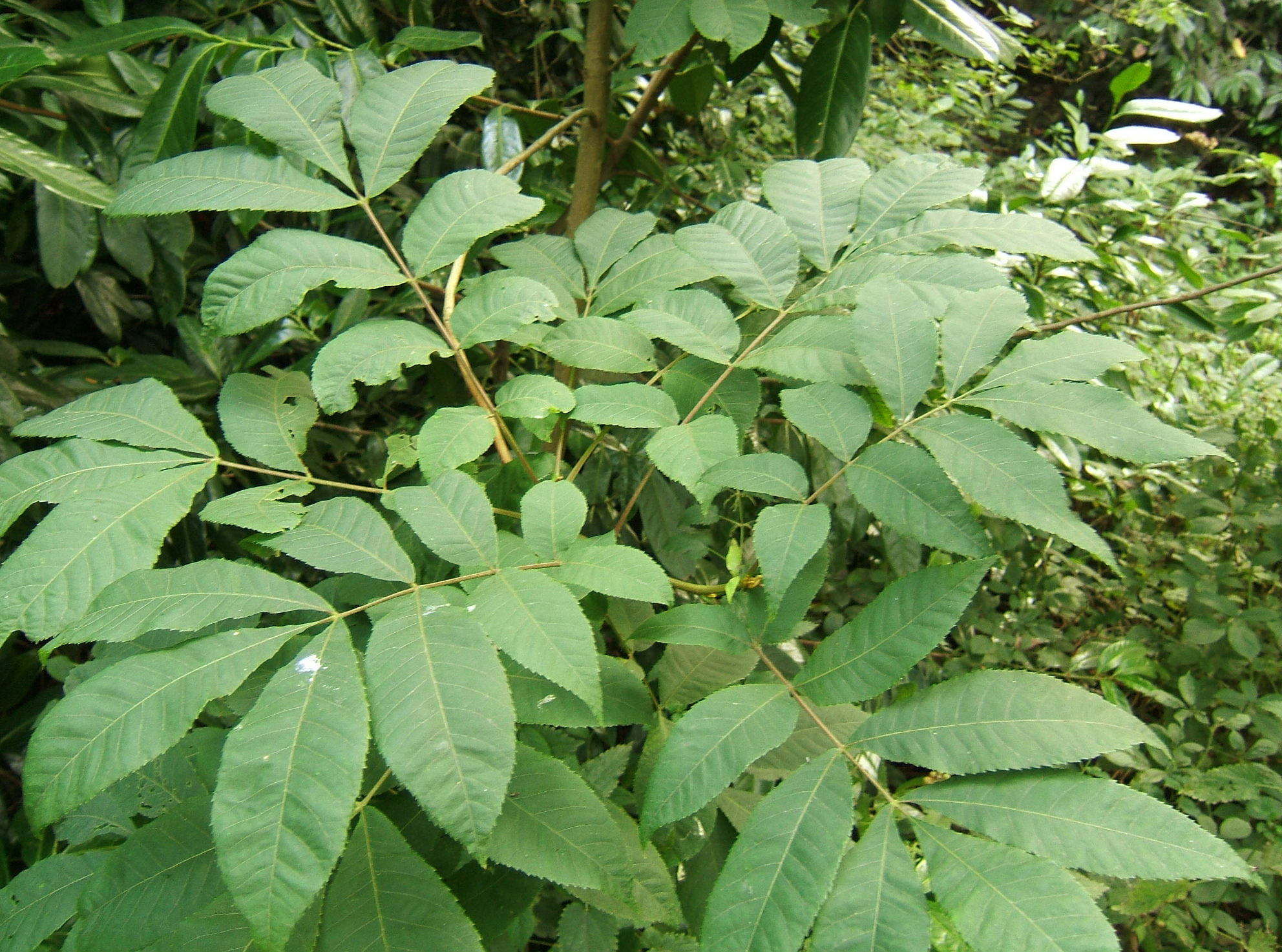
Foliage of Carya cordiformis (bitternut hickory)

- Carya aquatica (F.Michx.) Nutt. – bitter pecan or water hickory
- Carya cordiformis (Wangenh.) K.Koch – bitternut hickory
- Carya illinoinensis (Wangenh.) K.Koch – pecan
- Carya palmeri W.E. Manning – Mexican hickory

== Distribution and habitat ==
Seven species are native to southeast Asia in China, Indochina, and northeastern India (Assam), and twelve are native to North America, of which eleven occur in the United States, four in Mexico (of which one, C. palmeri, endemic there), and five extending into southern Canada.

== Ecology ==
Hickory is used as a food plant by the larvae of some Lepidoptera species. These include:

- Luna moth (Actias luna)
- Brown-tail moth (Euproctis chrysorrhoea)
- Coleophora case-bearers, C. laticornella and C. ostryae
- Regal moths (Citheronia regalis), whose caterpillars are known as hickory horn-devils
- Walnut sphinx (Amorpha juglandis)
- The bride (nominate subspecies Catocala neogama neogama)
- Hickory tussock moth (Lophocampa caryae)

The hickory leaf stem gall phylloxera (Phylloxera caryaecaulis) also uses the hickory tree as a food source. Phylloxeridae are related to aphids and have a similarly complex life cycle. Eggs hatch in early spring and the galls quickly form around the developing insects. Phylloxera galls may damage weakened or stressed hickories, but are generally harmless. Deformed leaves and twigs can rain down from the tree in the spring as squirrels break off infected tissue and eat the galls, possibly for the protein content or because the galls are fleshy and favored by squirrels. The pecan gall curculio (Conotrachelus elegans) is a true weevil species also found feeding on galls of the hickory leaf stem gall phylloxera.

The banded hickory borer (Knulliana cincta) is also found on hickories.

Hickory nuts (Carya spp.), dried
Nutritional value per 100 g (3.5 oz)
- Energy: 2,749 kJ (657 kcal)
- Carbohydrates: 18.25 g
- Dietary fiber: 6.4 g
- Fat: 64.37 g
- Saturated: 7.038 g
- Monounsaturated: 32.611 g
- Polyunsaturated: 21.886 g
- Protein: 12.72 g
Amino acids
Tryptophan	0.139 g
Threonine	0.422 g
Isoleucine	0.576 g
Leucine	1.027 g
Lysine	0.497 g
Methionine	0.300 g
Cystine	0.271 g
Phenylalanine	0.713 g
Tyrosine	0.454 g
Valine	0.730 g
Arginine	2.086 g
Histidine	0.389 g
Alanine	0.662 g
Aspartic acid	1.368 g
Glutamic acid	2.885 g
Glycine	0.708 g
Proline	0.571 g
Serine	0.806 g
Vitamins and minerals
Vitamins	Quantity %DV^{†}
Vitamin A	131 IU
Thiamine (B1)	72% 0.867 mg
Riboflavin (B2)	10% 0.131 mg
Niacin (B3)	6% 0.907 mg
Pantothenic acid (B5)	35% 1.746 mg
Vitamin B6	11% 0.192 mg
Folate (B9)	10% 40 μg
Vitamin C	2% 2.0 mg
Minerals	Quantity %DV^{†}
Calcium	5% 61 mg
Copper	82% 0.738 mg
Iron	12% 2.12 mg
Magnesium	41% 173 mg
Manganese	200% 4.610 mg
Phosphorus	27% 336 mg
Potassium	15% 436 mg
Selenium	15% 8.1 μg
Sodium	0% 1 mg
Zinc	39% 4.31 mg
- Other constituents: Quantity
- Water: 2.65 g
- Link to USDA Database entry
- ^{†}Percentages estimated using US recommendations for adults, except for potassium, which is estimated based on expert recommendation from the National Academies.

== Uses ==
=== Nutrition ===
Dried hickory nuts are 3% water, 18% carbohydrates, 13% protein, and 64% fats. In a 100-gram (3 1/2-ounce) reference amount, dried hickory nuts supply 2,749 kilojoules (657 kilocalories) of food energy, and are a rich source (20% or more of the Daily Value, DV) of several B vitamins and dietary minerals, especially manganese at 220% DV.

=== Culinary ===
An extract from shagbark hickory bark is used in an edible syrup similar to maple syrup, with a slightly bitter, smoky taste. The Cherokee people would produce a green dye from hickory bark, which they used to dye cloth. When this bark was mixed with maple bark, it produced a yellow dye pigment. The ashes of burnt hickory wood were traditionally used to produce a strong lye (potash) fit for soapmaking.

The nuts of some species are palatable, while others are bitter and only suitable for animal feed. Hickory nuts were a significant food source for indigenous peoples of the Eastern Woodlands of North America since the middle Archaic period. They were used by the Cherokee in Kanuchi soup, but more often edible oil would be extracted through crushing the nuts and then either straining or boiling the remains. Shagbark and shellbark hickory, along with pecan, are regarded by some as the finest nut trees. Pecans are the most important nut tree native to North America.

When cultivated for their nuts, clonal (grafted) trees of the same cultivar cannot pollinate each other because of their self-incompatibility. Two or more cultivars must be planted together for successful pollination. Seedlings (grown from hickory nuts) will usually have sufficient genetic variation.

=== Wood ===
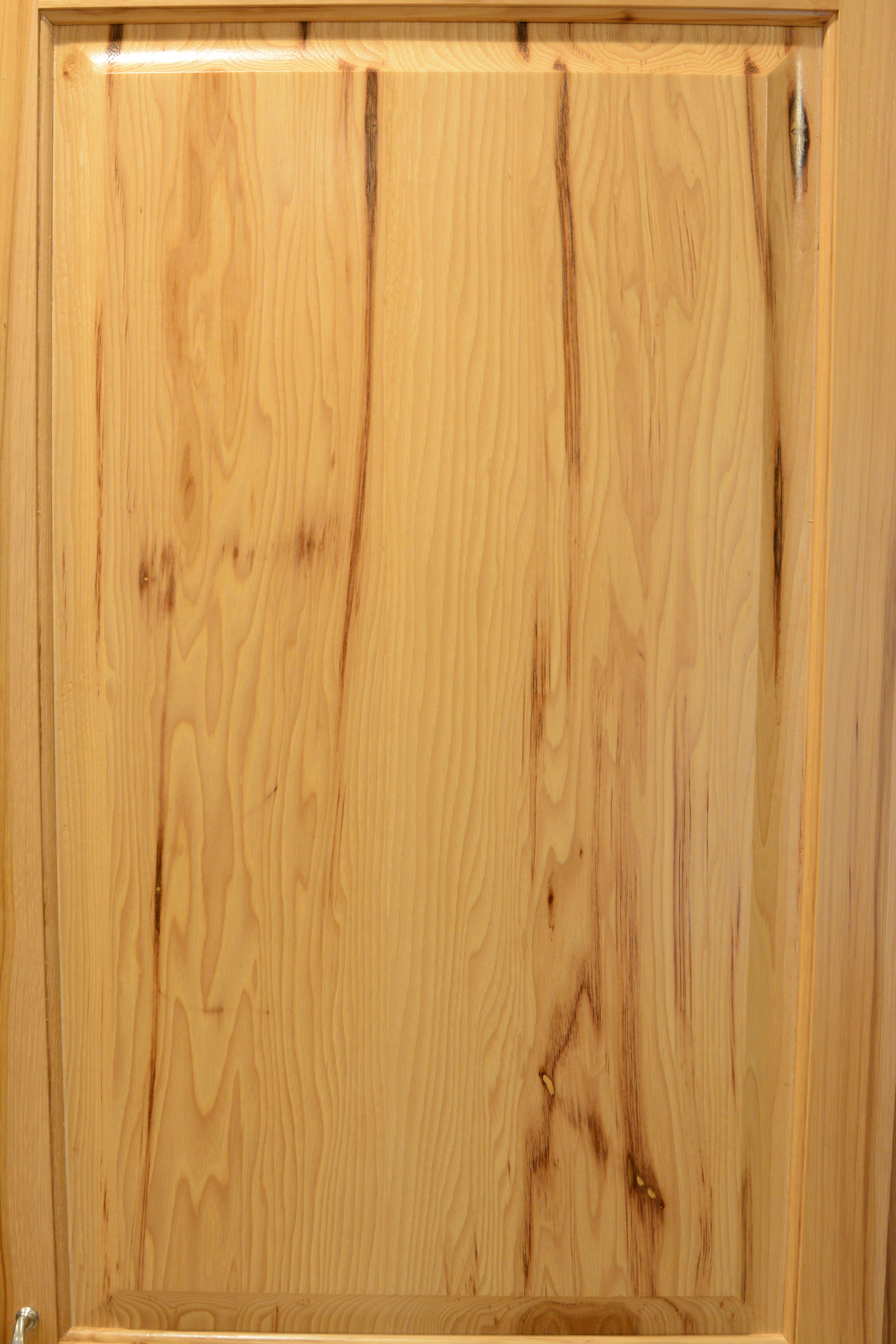
Finished hickory in a cabinet

Hickory wood is hard, stiff, dense and shock resistant. There are woods stronger than hickory and woods that are harder, but the combination of strength, toughness, hardness, and stiffness found in hickory wood is not found in any other commercial wood. Hickory is therefore used in a number of items requiring these properties, such as tool handles, bows, wheel spokes, walking sticks, drumsticks and wood flooring. Baseball bats were formerly made of hickory, but are now more commonly made of ash; however, it is replacing ash as the wood of choice for Scottish shinty sticks. Traditional lacrosse sticks are made out of hickory, however since the 1970s lacrosse sticks have switched to plastic heads on metal shafts. Hickory was also extensively used for the construction of early aircraft.

Due to its grain structure, hickory is more susceptible to moisture absorption than other species of wood, and is therefore more prone to shrinkage, warping or swelling with changes in humidity.

Hickory is also highly prized for wood-burning stoves and chimineas, as its density and high energy content make it an efficient fuel. Hickory wood is also a preferred type for smoking cured meats. In the Southern United States, hickory is popular for cooking barbecue, as hickory grows abundantly in the region and adds flavor to the meat.

== Gallery ==
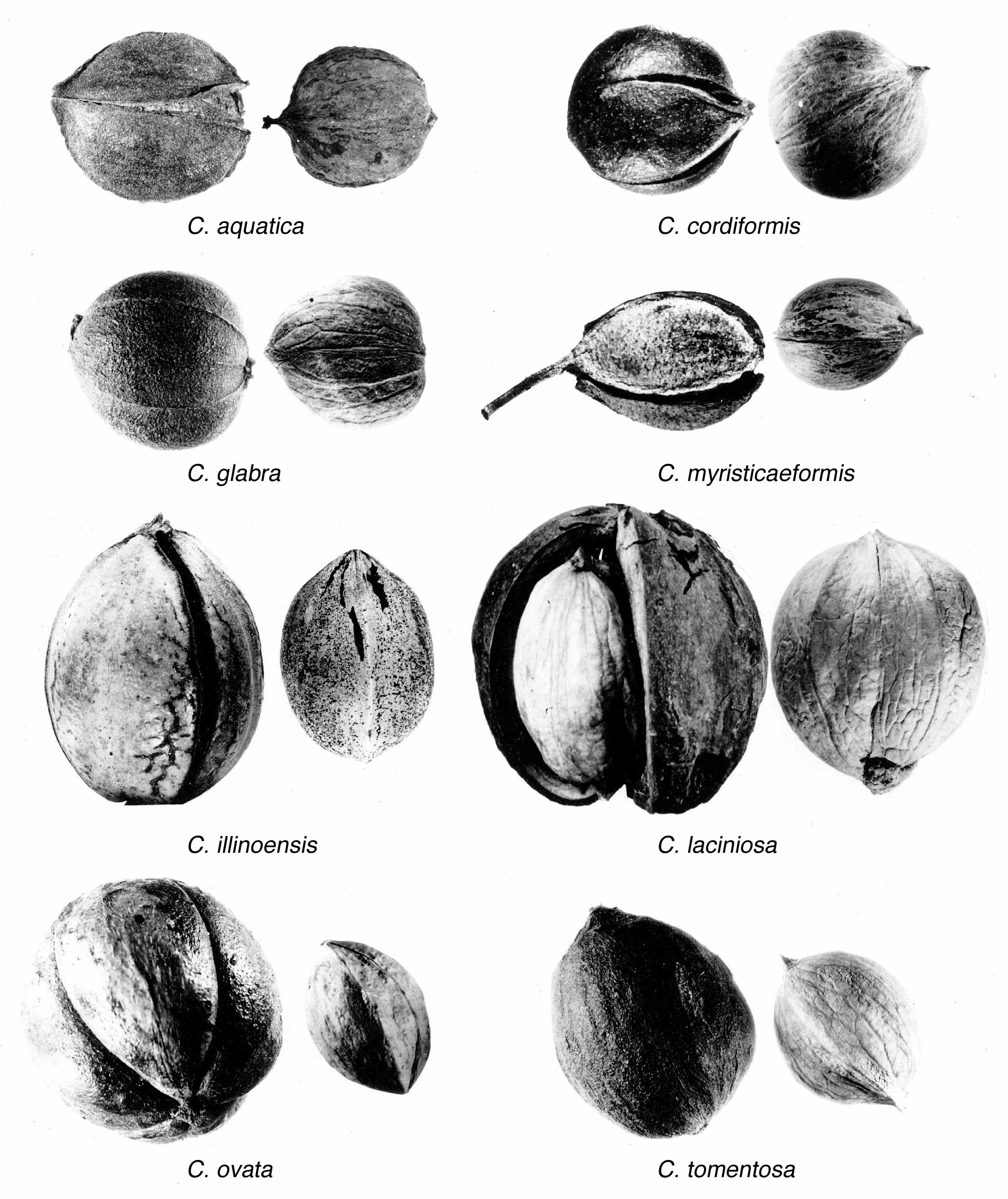
Comparison of North American Carya nuts

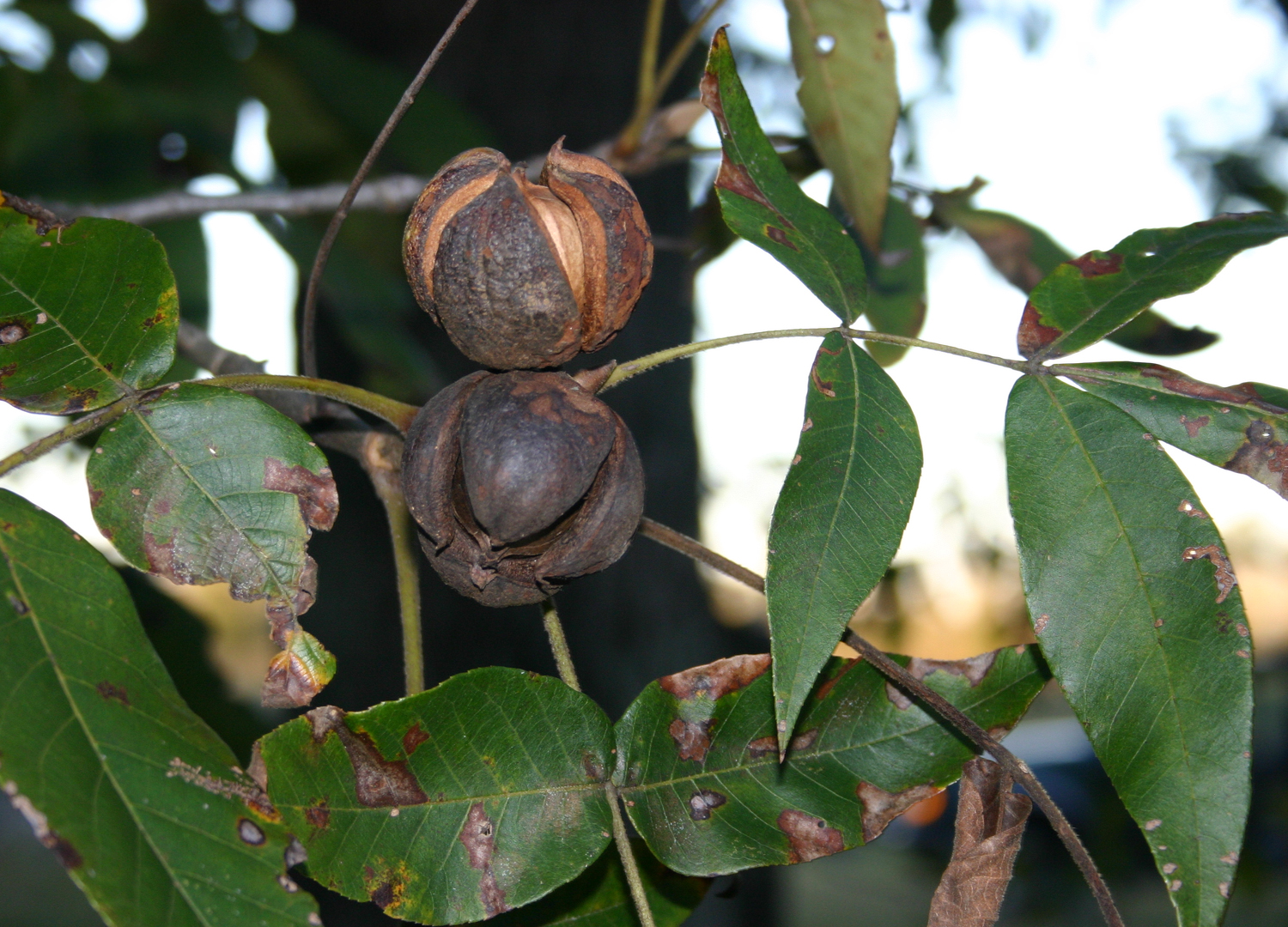
Ripe hickory nuts ready to fall

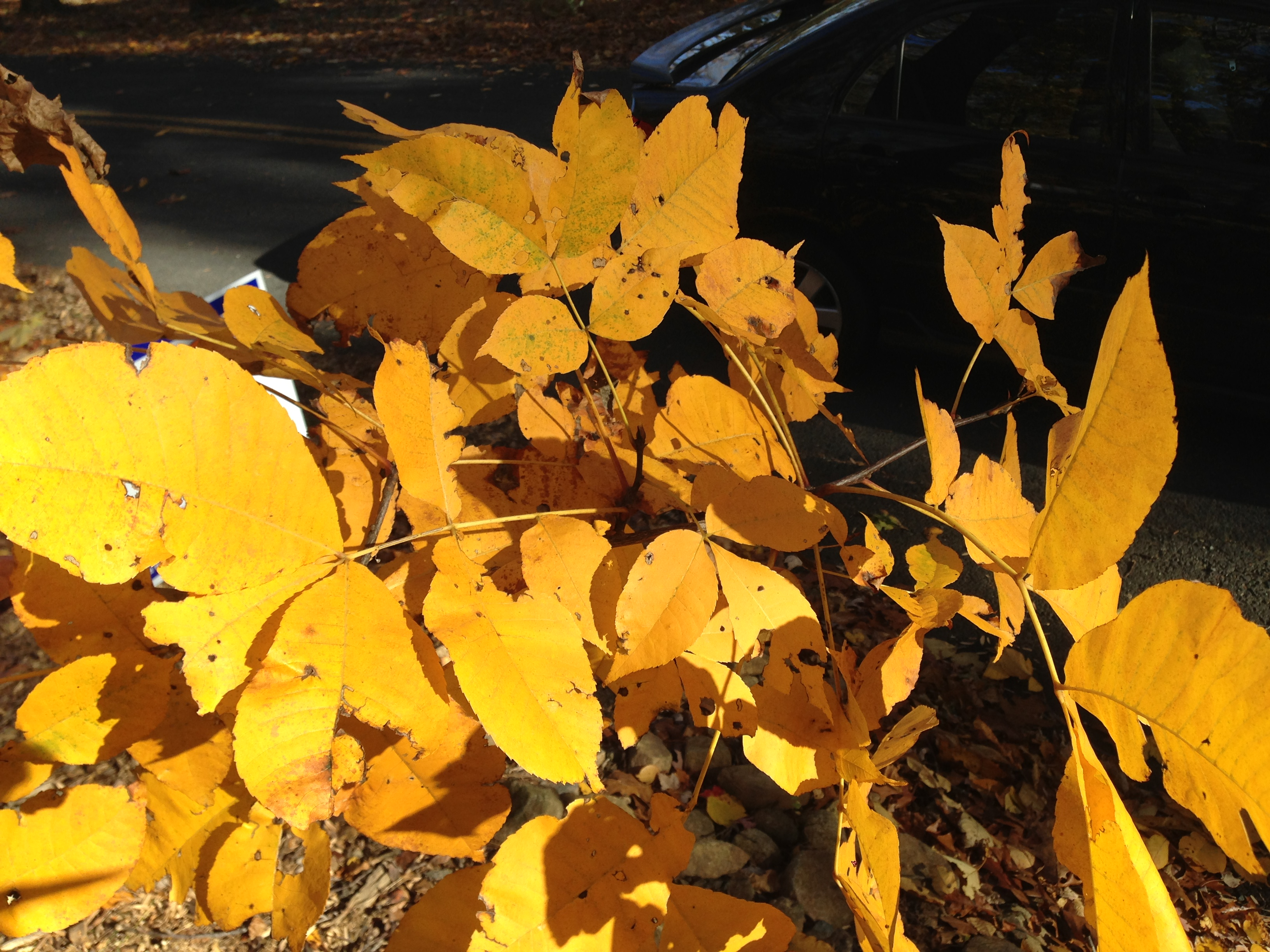
Autumn foliage

== See also ==
- Hican – Hybrid of pecan and another type of hickory
- Walnut – Nut of any tree of the genus Juglans
