= Carya hunanensis =

Scientific classification
- Kingdom: Plantae
- Clade: Tracheophytes
- Clade: Angiosperms
- Clade: Eudicots
- Clade: Rosids
- Order: Fagales
- Family: Juglandaceae
- Genus: Carya
- Section: Carya sect. Sinocarya
- Species: C. hunanensis

Binomial name
- Carya hunanensis C.C.Cheng & R.H.Chang

Species of flowering plant

Carya hunanensis is a species of hickory native to China. It was first described by Wan Chun Cheng and R.H. Chang. Carya hunanensis is part of the genus Carya, and the family Juglandaceae. No subspecies are listed in the Catalog of Life.

== Range ==
The tree is found in valleys and riverbanks at an elevation of 900–1000 meters. It is found in Guangxi, Guizhou, and Hunan.

== Cultivation ==
The tree is cultivated for its edible nuts, which are also pressed for oil.
