= Eugène Appert =

French painter

Eugène Appert who was born at Angers in 1814, went to Paris in 1837, and became a disciple of Ingres. He painted numerous pictures of merit, among which are a portrait of Pope Alexander III as a Beggar, which is now in the Luxembourg; Nero before the dead body of Agrippina, in the Museum of Montauban, and several pictures of religious subjects in the hospital of Angers. Appert painted genre and historical subjects, and also still-life. He was a Chevalier of the Legion of Honour. He died at Cannes in 1867.
