= Wayne Eyer Manning =

American horticulturist and botanist (1899–2004)

Wayne Eyer Manning (December 4, 1899 – February 8, 2004) was an American horticulturist and botanist.

== Biography ==
In 1920, Manning obtained his Bachelor of Sciences from Oberlin College. In 1926 he received his Ph.D. from Cornell University. His dissertation research was based on the study of the floral anatomy of Juglandaceae.

Manning was a professor at Cornell for one year and then began teaching at the University of Illinois at Urbana–Champaign. He then became a professor at Smith College where he taught from 1928 until 1941. In 1945, he began teaching at Bucknell University. He remained at this university until his retirement in 1968.

He published more than 40 publications mainly on the subject of Juglandaceae.

== Some publications ==
The standard author abbreviation W.E.Manning is used to indicate this person as the author when citing a botanical name.

- 1926. The Morphology and Anatomy of the Flowers of the Juglandaceae. Ed. Cornell Univ. 264 pp.

== Honors ==
=== Eponimia ===
Species

- (Juglandaceae) Alfaroa manningii León
