= Monographs in Systematic Botany =

Monographs in Systematic Botany from the Missouri Botanical Garden
- Discipline: Botany
- Language: English and Spanish

Publication details
- History: 1978–present
- Publisher: Missouri Botanical Garden Press (United States)
- Frequency: Irregular

Standard abbreviations
- ISO 4: Monogr. Syst. Bot. Mo. Bot. Gard.

Indexing
- CODEN: MSBOE5
- ISSN: 0161-1542
- LCCN: sf93010030
- OCLC no.: 3861431

Links
- Journal homepage

Monographs in Systematic Botany also known as Monographs in Systematic Botany from the Missouri Botanical Garden is a series of monographs relating to the study of systematic botany. It is published by the Missouri Botanical Garden Press.

Monographs in Systematic Botany was established in 1978. By 2010 a total of 120 issues had been published, approximately 15% of which, relating to the flora of Latin America, are published in Spanish.

== Abstracting and indexing ==
Monographs of Systematic Botany is indexed and abstracted in BioOne.
