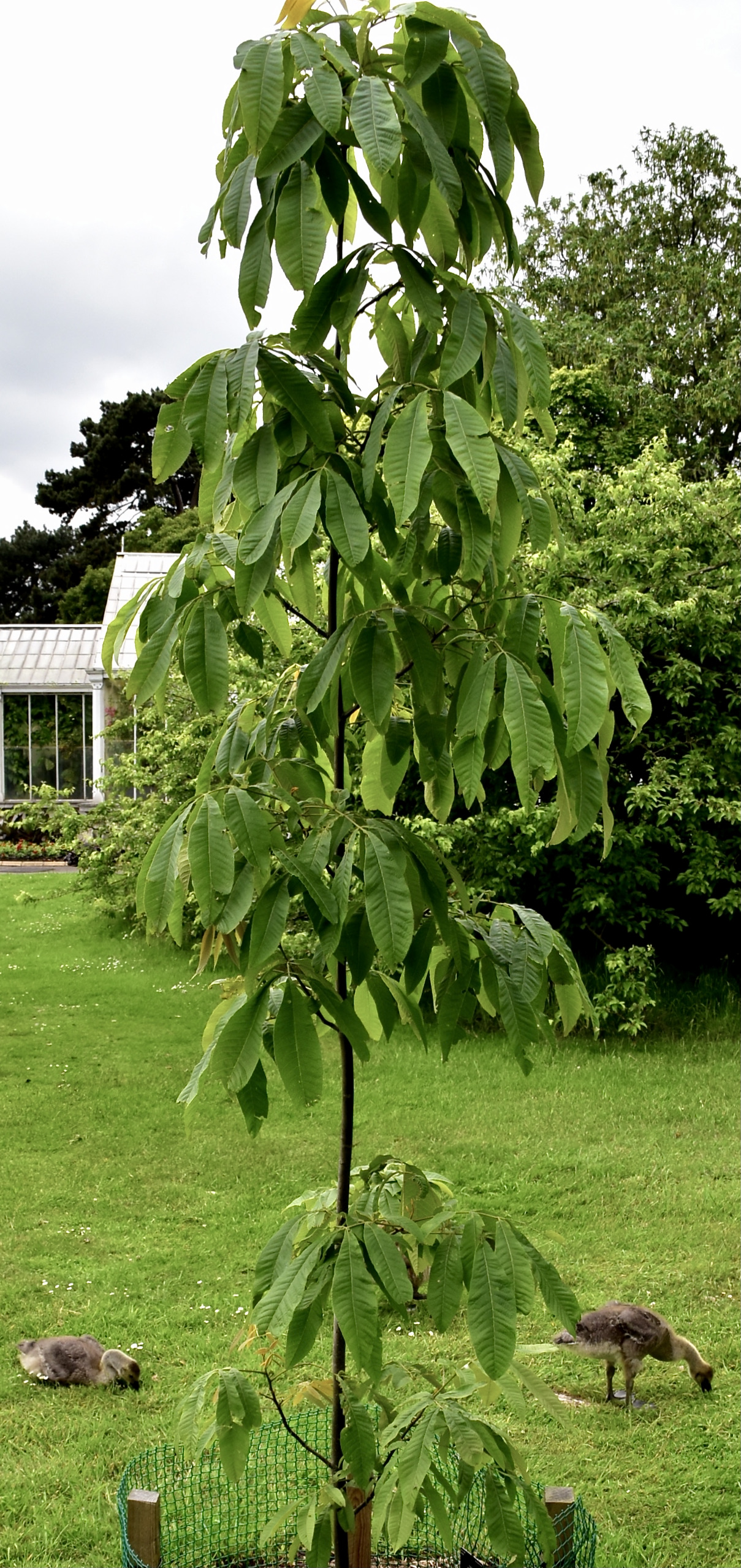

Scientific classification
- Kingdom: Plantae
- Clade: Tracheophytes
- Clade: Angiosperms
- Clade: Eudicots
- Clade: Rosids
- Order: Fagales
- Family: Juglandaceae
- Genus: Carya
- Section: Carya sect. Sinocarya
- Species: C. cathayensis

Binomial name
- Carya cathayensis Sarg.

= Carya cathayensis =

Species of tree

Carya cathayensis, commonly called Chinese hickory, is a species of hickory native to China, where it is known as shanhetao (Chinese: 山核桃). It is valued for its edible nuts.

== Description ==
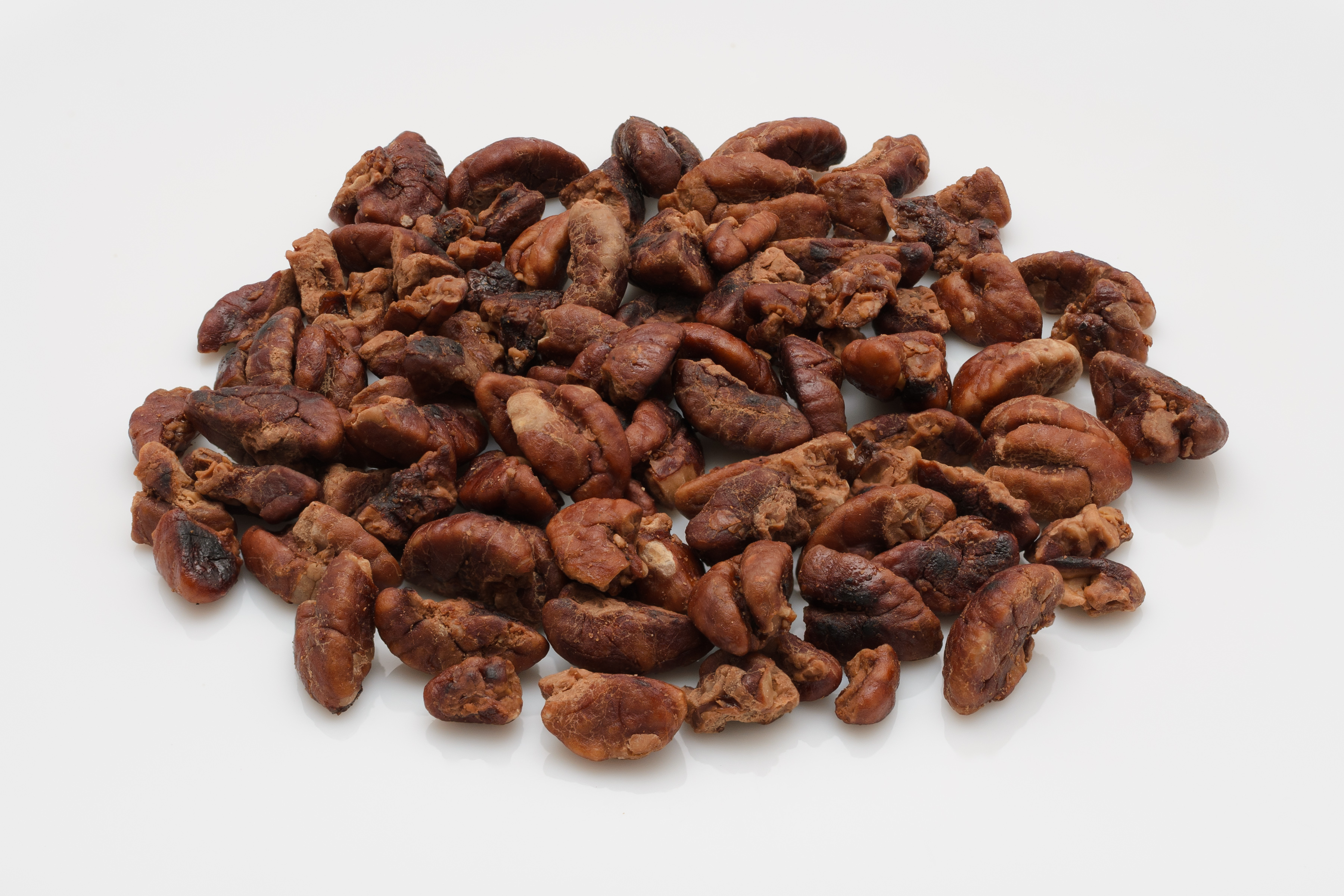
Roasted Chinese hickory nuts from Hangzhou

The tree is slow growing and reaches a height of 20 meters, growing mostly on mountain slopes, valleys, and riverbanks from 400-1,500 meters in elevation and typically found in the provinces of Anhui, Guizhou, Jiangxi, and Zhejiang.

== As food ==
Approximately 5,000 tons of hickory nuts can be produced from 16,000 hectares of trees, with the nuts being roasted or made into candy, and the oil used for cooking. Peeled and roasted nuts, known as shanhetaoren (山核桃仁), are a well-known specialty of Hangzhou.
