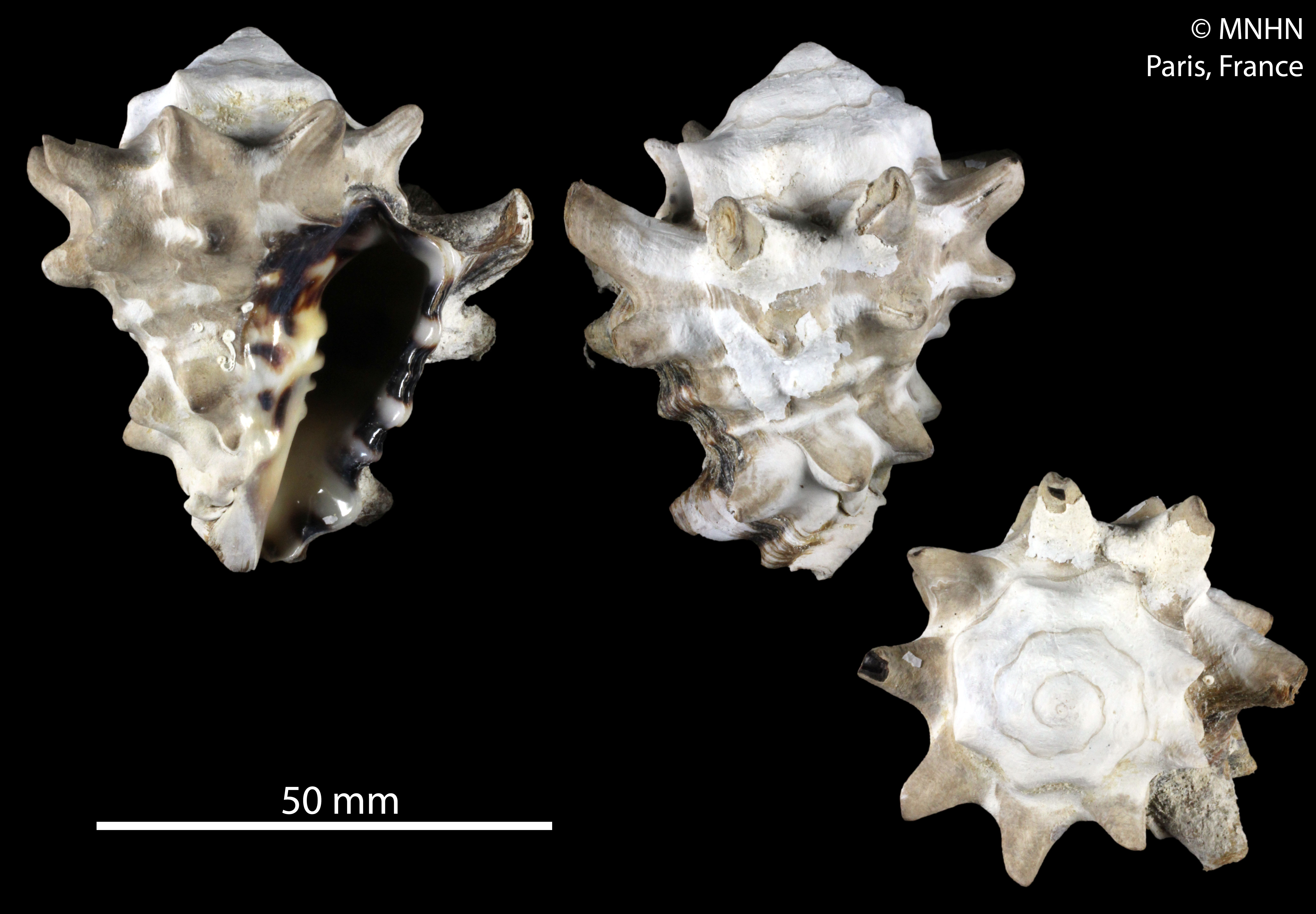
- Shell of Vasum turbinellus (specimen in MNHN, Paris)

Scientific classification
- Kingdom: Animalia
- Phylum: Mollusca
- Class: Gastropoda
- Subclass: Caenogastropoda
- Order: Neogastropoda
- Superfamily: Turbinelloidea
- Family: Vasidae
- Genus: Vasum; Röding, 1798

Type species
- Murex ceramicus Linnaeus, 1758

Synonyms
- Cynodonta Schumacher, 1817; Globivasum Abbott, 1950; Scolymus Swainson, 1835; Vasum (Siphovasum) Rehder & Abbott, 1951 alternate representation; Vasum (Vasum) Röding, 1798 ·; Volutella Perry, 1810

= Vasum =

Genus of gastropods

Vasum, common name the vase snails or vase shells, is a genus of mostly rather large predatory sea snails, marine gastropod mollusks in the family Vasidae.

== Shell description ==
Shells of species in this genus are usually somewhat large, and are usually very thick and heavy. They are often vase-shaped, in the sense that the shell of most of the species is more or less widely conical. The shells have a thick periostracum, a low spires, and 2, 3 or 4 plaits on the columella.

The shell is oval, oblong, solid, tubercular or spinose, with spinose fascicles below. The spire is short. The apex is not papillary. The aperture is oblong. The siphonal canal is short and somewhat recurved. The columella contains several transverse folds in the middle. The outer lip is thickened and sinuous.

The animal (of Vasum) is slow-moving, timid and inactive, shrinking quickly within the shell on the slightest alarm. The operculum is ovate, acute, with an apical nucleus; it is very thick, claw-like, and partially free at the hind part. The dentition resembles somewhat that of the Buccinidae, differing in the lateral teeth; it differs widely from the Nassidae, and quite as much from that of the Fasciolariidae

== Distribution ==
Species of this genus are circumtropical; also off Australia (Northern Territory, Queensland, Western Australia)

== Species ==
Species within the genus Vasum include:

- † Vasum abbasi Thach, 2025
- Vasum armatum (Broderip, 1833)
- Vasum ceramicum (Linnaeus, 1758)
- † Vasum frequens (Mayer-Eymar, 1895)
- † Vasum stevenliei Thach & Abbas, 2025
- Vasum turbinellus (Linnaeus, 1758)

== Synonyms ==
list of synonyms
- † Vasum aedificatum Guppy 1876: synonym of † Globivasum aedificatum (Guppy, 1876)
- Vasum aldridgei Nowell-Usticke, 1969: synonym of Attiliosa aldridgei (Nowell-Usticke, 1969)
- Vasum antiguaensis Usticke, 1971: synonym of Vasum globulus (Lamarck, 1816)
- † Vasum aquitanicum Peyrot, 1928: synonym of † Rhinovasum aquitanicum (Peyrot, 1928)
- † Vasum basilicum Bellardi 1872: synonym of † Melongena basilica (Bellardi, 1873)
- Vasum caestus (Broderip, 1833): synonym of Volutella caestus (Broderip, 1833)
- † Vasum cancellatum (Grateloup, 1845): synonym of † Globivasum cancellatum (Grateloup, 1845)
- Vasum capitellum (Linnaeus, 1758): synonym of Globivasum capitellum (Linnaeus, 1758)
- Vasum cassidiformis Kiener, 1845: synonym of Vasum cassiforme (Kiener, 1840)
- Vasum cassiforme (Kiener, 1840): synonym of Aristovasum cassiforme (Kiener, 1840)
- Vasum castaneum Röding, 1798: synonym of Thais (Thalessa) tuberosa (Röding, 1798)
- Vasum crosseanum (Souverbie, 1875): synonym of Rhinovasum crosseanum (Souverbie, 1875)
- † Vasum dominicense Gabb 1873: synonym of † Globivasum dominicense (Gabb, 1873)
- † Vasum elongatum Vokes 1970: synonym of † Globivasum elongatum (E. H. Vokes, 1970)
- † Vasum excrenatum Sacco, 1904: synonym of † Vasum cancellatum (Grateloup, 1845)
- Vasum flindersi Verco, 1914: synonym of Altivasum flindersi (Verco, 1914)
- † Vasum floridanum T. L. McGinty, 1940: synonym of † Volutella floridana (McGinty, 1940)
- Vasum globulus (Lamarck, 1816): synonym of Globivasum globulus (Lamarck, 1816)
- † Vasum gurabicum Maury 1917: synonym of † Globivasum gurabicum (Maury, 1917)
- † Vasum haitensis Sowerby 1850: synonym of † Volutella haitensis (G. B. Sowerby I, 1850)
- † Vasum humerosum Vaughan, 1896: synonym of † Globivasum humerosum (Vaughan, 1896)
- † Vasum intermedium (Grateloup, 1832): synonym of † Globivasum intermedium (Grateloup, 1832)
- † Vasum kraatzi C. S. Ferreira & O. R. Cunha, 1957: synonym of † Globivasum kraatzi (C. S. Ferreira & O. R. Cunha, 1957)
- Vasum lactisfloris Ferrario, 1983: synonym of Florivasum lactisfloris (Ferrario, 1983)
- Vasum latiriforme Rehder & Abbott, 1951: synonym of Siphovasum latiriforme (Rehder & Abbott, 1951)
- Vasum muricatum (Born, 1778): synonym of Volutella muricata (Born, 1778)
- † Vasum omanicum Harzhauser, 2007: synonym of † Globivasum omanicum (Harzhauser, 2007)
- † Vasum quirosense F. Hodson, 1931: synonym of † Vasum haitensis Sowerby, 1850
- Vasum nigra G. Perry, 1811: synonym of Vasum turbinellus (Linnaeus, 1758)
- Vasum nigricans G. Perry, 1811: synonym of Vasum turbinellus (Linnaeus, 1758)
- † Vasum pufferi Emerson 1964: synonym of † Volutella pufferi (W. K. Emerson, 1964)
- † Vasum pugnus Pilsbry and Johnson 1917: synonym of † Globivasum pugnus (Pilsbry & C. W. Johnson, 1917)
- Vasum rhinoceros (Gmelin, 1791): synonym of Rhinovasum rhinoceros (Gmelin, 1791)
- Vasum rubescens G. Perry, 1811: synonym of Vasum capitellum (C. Linnaeus, 1758)
- Vasum spinosus G. Fischer von Waldheim, 1807 : synonym of Vasum ceramicum (C. Linnaeus, 1758)
- † Vasum stephanense Peyrot, 192: synonym of † Vasum cancellatum (Grateloup, 1845)
- Vasum stephanti Emerson & Sage, 1988: synonym of Florivasum stephanti (W. K. Emerson & Sage, 1988)
- † Vasum subpugillare (d'Orbigny, 1852): synonym of † Rhinovasum subpugillare (A. d'Orbigny, 1852)
- † Vasum suwanneensis Petuch 1997: synonym of † Globivasum suwanneense (Petuch, 1997)
- † Vasum subcapitellum Heilprin, 1886: synonym of † Globivasum subcapitellum (Heilprin, 1886)
- Vasum triangulare (E. A. Smith, 1902): synonym of Rhinovasum triangulare (E. A. Smith, 1902)
- † Vasum tribulosum Vokes 1970: synonym of † Volutella tribulosa (E. H. Vokes, 1970)
- Vasum truncatum (G.B. Sowerby III, 1892): synonym of Rhinovasum truncatum (G.B. Sowerby III, 1892)
- † Vasum tuberculatum Gabb 1873: synonym of † Rhinovasum tuberculatum (Gabb, 1873)
- Vasum tubiferum (Anton, 1838): synonym of Florivasum tubiferum (Anton, 1838)
- Vasum turbinellum [sic]: synonym of Vasum turbinellus (Linnaeus, 1758)
- Vasum urna Röding, 1798: synonym of Vasum muricatum (Born, 1778)
- Vasum variolaris J.B.P.A. Lamarck, 1822: synonym of Vasum turbinellus (Linnaeus, 1758)
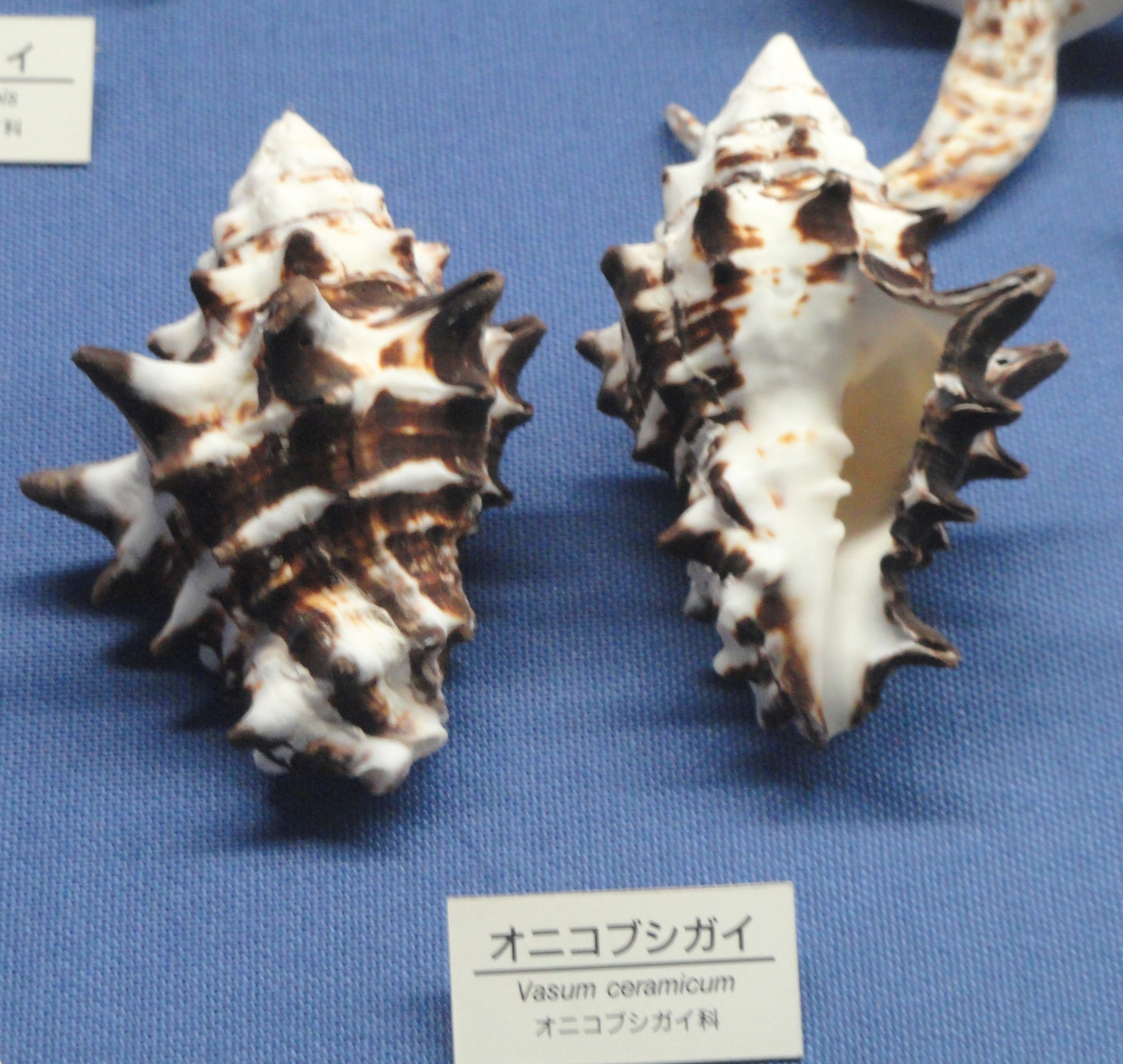
Vasum ceramicum

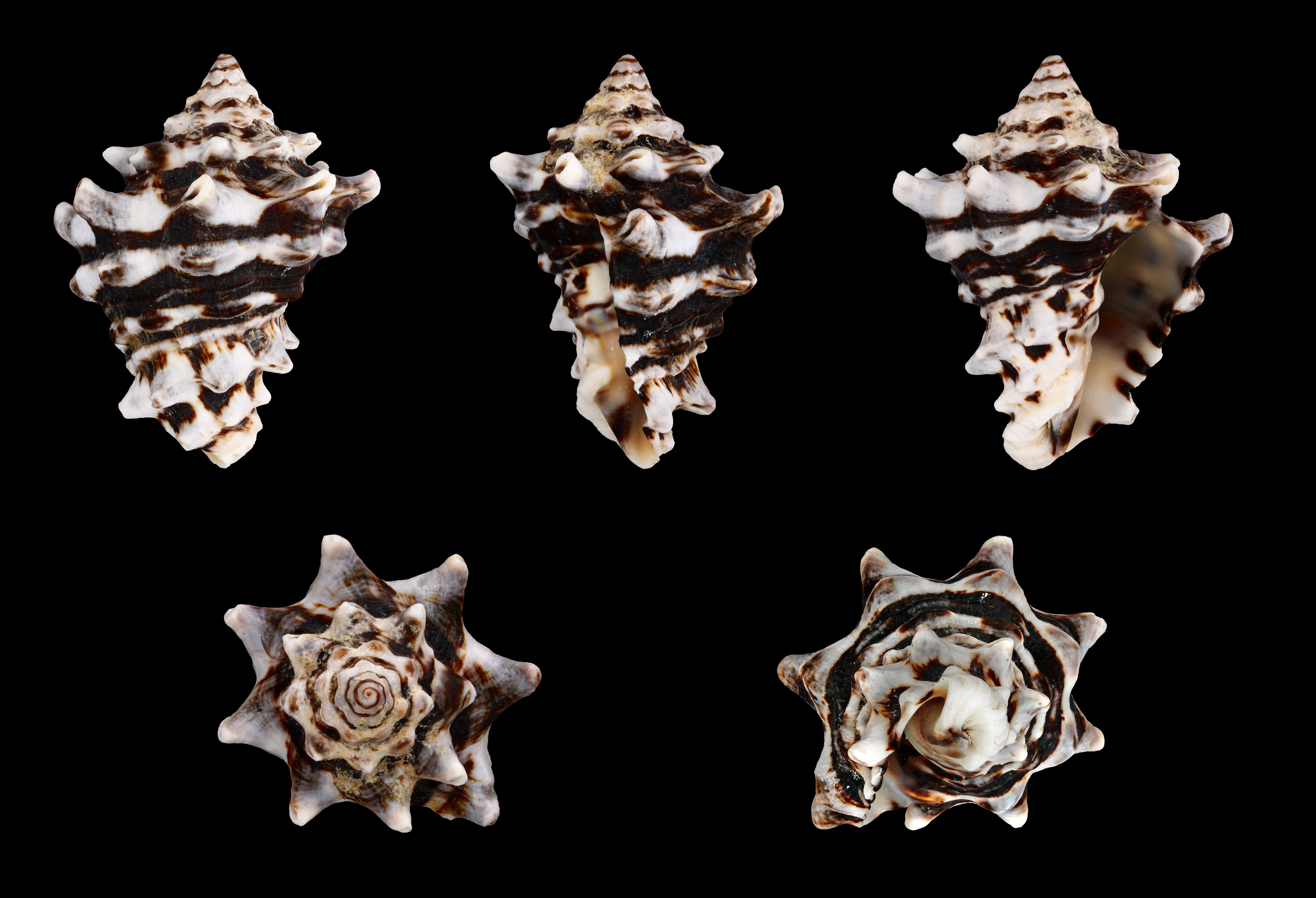
Vasum turbinellus
