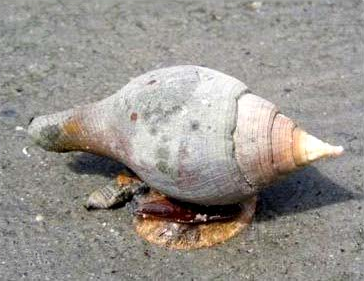
- A live individual of Turbinella laevigata

Scientific classification
- Kingdom: Animalia
- Phylum: Mollusca
- Class: Gastropoda
- Subclass: Caenogastropoda
- Order: Neogastropoda
- Superfamily: Turbinelloidea
- Family: Turbinellidae
- Genus: Turbinella; Lamarck, 1799

Type species
- Voluta pyrum Linnaeus, 1767

Synonyms
- Buccinella Perry, 1811; Turbinellus Lamarck, 1801 (invalid emendation of Turbinella, placed on Official Index by Opinion 489); Xancus Röding, 1798

= Turbinella =

Genus of gastropods

Turbinella is a genus of very large sea snails with an operculum, marine gastropod mollusks in the subfamily Turbinellinae of the family Turbinellidae.

These species are sometimes known as "chanks" or "chank shells". One species in this genus is the sacred chank, Turbinella pyrum; see "Shankha" for the cultural and religious use of the shell of that species.

== Distribution ==
Species in this genus are found worldwide, mostly in tropical shallow waters.

== Description ==
Most species have massive shells with three or four prominent columellar plicae.

The smooth shell is thick and obconic. The body whorl is large. The spire is obtuse. The apex is papillary. The aperture is oblong and narrow. The siphonal canal is long and straight. The columella sgows several strong transverse plaits in the middle. The outer lip is thin and simple.

== Species ==
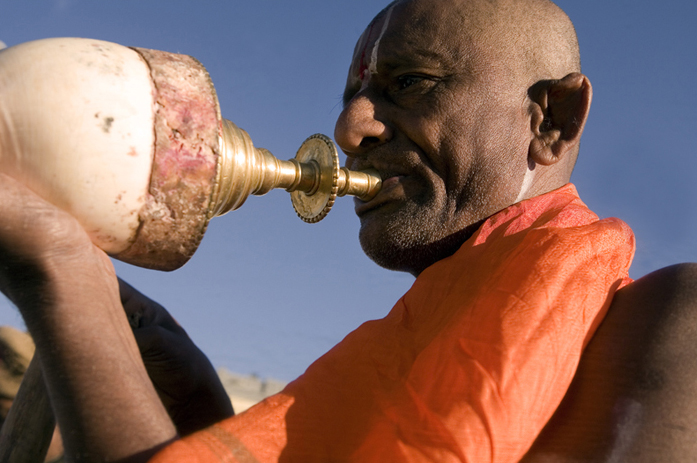
Hindu priest blowing a trumpet made out of a large shell of Turbinella pyrum, in Tirupati, India

Species within the genus Turbinella include:

- Turbinella angulata (Lightfoot, 1786)
- Turbinella fusus Sowerby I, 1825
- Turbinella laevigata Anton, 1838
- Turbinella laffertyi Kilburn, 1975
- Turbinella ponderosa (Lightfoot, 1786)
- Turbinella pyrum Linnaeus, 1758 - the sacred chank or shankha
- Turbinella rapa Lamarck, 1816
- †Turbinella regina Heilprin, 1886
- Turbinella wheeleri Petuch, 1994

Species brought into synonymy

- Turbinella armata Broderip, 1833: synonym of Vasum armatum (Broderip, 1833)
- Turbinella armigera Lesson, 1842 : synonym of Reishia armigera (Link, 1807)
- Turbinella cassiformis Kiener, 1840: synonym of Vasum cassiforme (Kiener, 1840)
- Turbinella cornigera Lamarck, 1822: synonym of Vasum turbinellus (Linnaeus, 1758)
- Turbinella crenulata Kiener, 1840: synonym of Peristernia chlorostoma (G. B. Sowerby I, 1825)
- Turbinella globulus Lamarck, 1816: synonym of Vasum globulus (Lamarck, 1816)
- Turbinella leucozonalis Lamarck, 1822: synonym of Leucozonia leucozonalis (Lamarck, 1822)
- Turbinella mitis Lamarck, 1822: synonym of Vasum capitellum (Linnaeus, 1758)
- Turbinella nuttingi Henderson, 1919: synonym of Vasum globulus (Lamarck, 1816)
- Turbinella pugillaris Lamarck, 1822: synonym of Vasum muricatum (Born, 1778)
- Turbinella tuberculata Broderip, 1833 : synonym of Leucozonia tuberculata (Broderip, 1833)
- Turbinella tubifera Anton, 1838: synonym of Vasum tubiferum (Anton, 1838)
- Turbinella variolaris Lamarck, 1822: synonym of Vasum turbinellus (Linnaeus, 1758)

Species inquirenda

- Turbinella tuberculata Anton, 1838 (species inquirenda, Invalid: junior homonym of Turbinella tuberculata Broderip, 1833)
