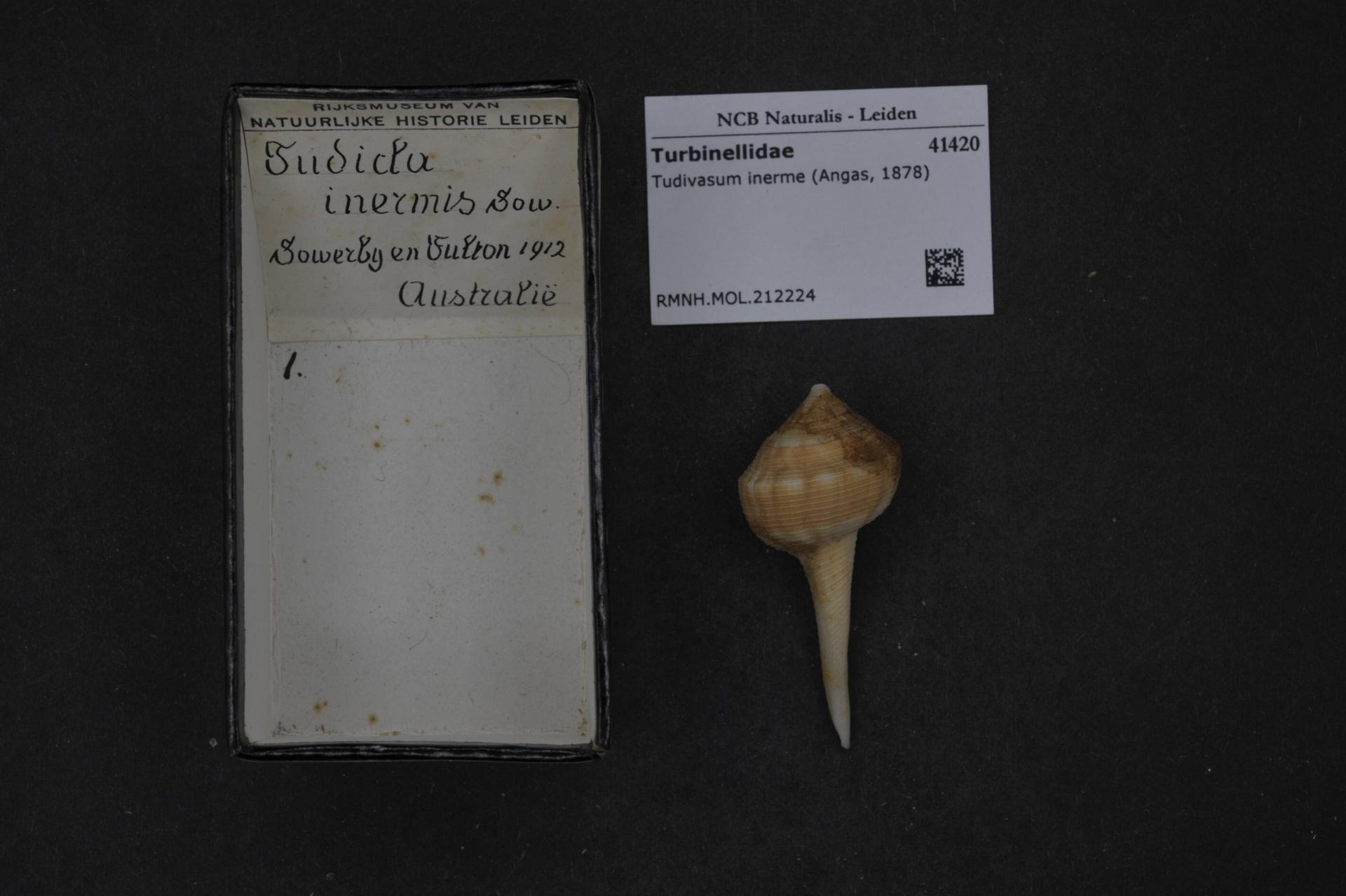
- Tudivasum inerme

Scientific classification
- Kingdom: Animalia
- Phylum: Mollusca
- Class: Gastropoda
- Subclass: Caenogastropoda
- Order: Neogastropoda
- Family: Vasidae
- Genus: Tudivasum; Rosenberg & Petit, 1987

Type species
- Tudicla armigera A. Adams, 1856

Synonyms
- Tudicla (Tudicula) H. Adams & A. Adams, 1864 junior homonym (of Tudicula Ryckholt, 1862; Tudivasum Rosenberg & Petit, 1987 is a replacement name; Tudicula H. Adams & A. Adams, 1864 junior homonym (of Tudicula Ryckholt, 1862; Tudivasum. Rosenberg & Petit, 1987 is a replacement name); Tudicula (Tudicula) [sic] · unaccepted (unjustified emendation); Turbinella (Tudicula) H. Adams & A. Adams, 1864 ·

= Tudivasum =

Genus of gastropods

Tudivasum is a genus of large sea snails, marine gastropod mollusks in the subfamily Vasinae, the vase shells, within the family Vasidae.

== Species ==
Species within the genus Tudivasum include:

- Tudivasum amandacantamessae S. J. Maxwell, Y. Zheng & Berschauer, 2024
- † Tudivasum angulatum (Tate, 1888)
- Tudivasum annettae S. J. Maxwell, Y. Zheng & Berschauer, 2024
- Tudivasum armigerum (A. Adams, 1856)
- Tudivasum ashmorense H. Morrison, 2020
- Tudivasum barbaracollinsae S. J. Maxwell, Y. Zheng & Berschauer, 2024
- Tudivasum chaneyi H. Morrison, 2020
- † Tudivasum costatum (Tate, 1888)
- Tudivasum glendae S. J. Maxwell, Y. Zheng & Berschauer, 2024
- Tudivasum gracelumwanae Y. Zheng & S. J. Maxwell, 2025
- Tudivasum inerme (Angas, 1878)
- Tudivasum kurtzi (Macpherson, 1964)
- Tudivasum leemanense Y. Zheng & S. J. Maxwell, 2026
- † Tudivasum sinotectum (Ludbrook, 1941)
- Tudivasum spinosum (H. Adams & A. Adams, 1864)
- † Tudivasum turbinatum (Tate, 1888)
- Tudivasum variabile S. J. Maxwell, Y. Zheng & Berschauer, 2024
- Tudivasum westrale H. Morrison, 2020

Synonyms

- †Tudivasum rasilistoma (Abbott, 1959): synonym of Australivasum rasilistoma (Abbott, 1959) (unaccepted > superseded combination)
- Tudivasum simonaikeni T. Cossignani, 2024: synonym of Afrivasum simonaikeni (T. Cossignani, 2024) (superseded combination)
- Tudivasum variabilis S. J. Maxwell, Y. Zheng & Berschauer, 2024: synonym of Tudivasum variabile S. J. Maxwell, Y. Zheng & Berschauer, 2024 (incorrect grammatical agreement of specific epithet)
- Tudivasum zanzibaricum: synonym of Afrivasum zanzibaricum (Abbott, 1958) (superseded combination)
