= Altivasum clarksoni =

Scientific classification
- Kingdom: Animalia
- Phylum: Mollusca
- Class: Gastropoda
- Subclass: Caenogastropoda
- Order: Neogastropoda
- Family: Vasidae
- Genus: Altivasum
- Species: A. clarksoni

Binomial name
- Altivasum clarksoni S. J. Maxwell & Dekkers, 2019

Genus of gastropods

Altivasum clarksoni is a species of deepwater sea snails, marine gastropod molluscs in the family Vasidae.

== Distribution ==
This marine species is endemic to Australia and occurs off Western Australia.
