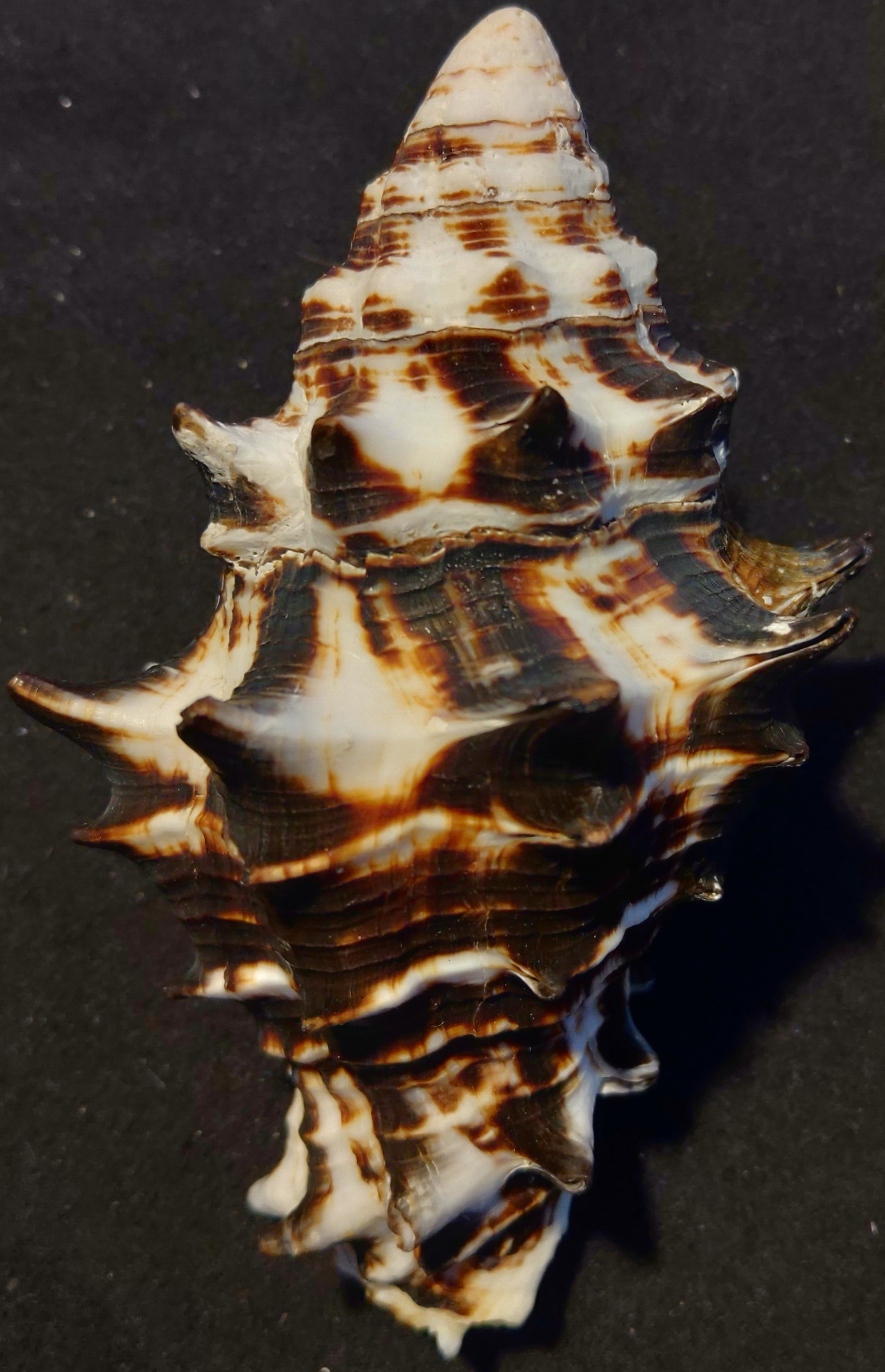

Scientific classification
- Kingdom: Animalia
- Phylum: Mollusca
- Class: Gastropoda
- Subclass: Caenogastropoda
- Order: Neogastropoda
- Superfamily: Turbinelloidea
- Family: Vasidae
- Genus: Vasum
- Species: V. ceramicum

Binomial name
- Vasum ceramicum (Linnaeus, 1758)

Synonyms
- Murex ceramicus Linnaeus, 1758 (original combination); Turbinellus spinosus Fischer von Waldheim, 1807 ·

= Vasum ceramicum =

Species of gastropod

Vasum ceramicum, common name ceramic vase or heavy whelk, is a species of medium to large sea snail, a marine gastropod mollusk in the family Vasidae.

== Description ==
Vasum ceramicum has a large, thick and heavy shell that reaches a length of 59 – 160 mm. This shell is quite elongated, conical or vase-shaped (hence the common name). It has long siphonal canal, three strong, columella folds and 7-10 strong spiny tubercles in each loop. It is colored white and greys or dark brown externally, while the aperture may be colored white or pale brown.

== Distribution ==
The species is widespread in the Mascarene Plateau, off the coast of Madagascar, and Tanzania.

== Habitat ==
This sea snail lives on lower eulittoral, rocky areas at depth of 10 to 40 m.
