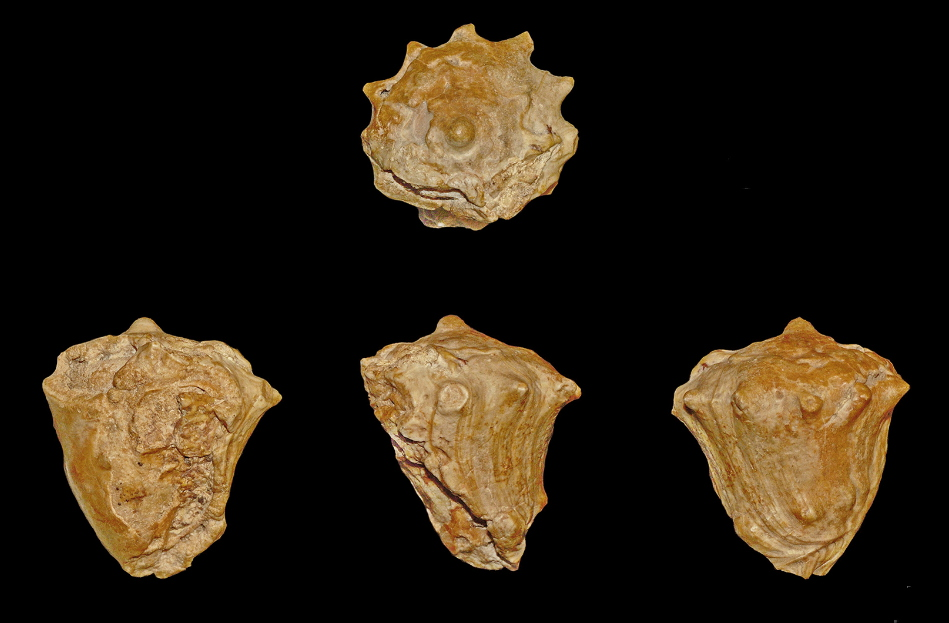
- Shell of Vasum frequens (specimen at MNHN, Paris)

Scientific classification
- Kingdom: Animalia
- Phylum: Mollusca
- Class: Gastropoda
- Subclass: Caenogastropoda
- Order: Neogastropoda
- Superfamily: Turbinelloidea
- Family: Vasidae
- Genus: Vasum
- Species: †V. frequens

Binomial name
- †Vasum frequens (Mayer-Eymar, 1895)

Synonyms
- Eovasum frequens (Mayer-Eymar, 1895); Turbinella frequens Mayer-Eymar, 1895

= Vasum frequens =

Species of gastropod

Vasum frequens is an extinct species of medium to large sea snail, a marine gastropod mollusk in the family Turbinellidae.

== Description ==
Measurements of the shell : 47 mm x 44 mm.

== Distribution ==
Fossils of this marine species have been found in Eocene strata of Egypt
