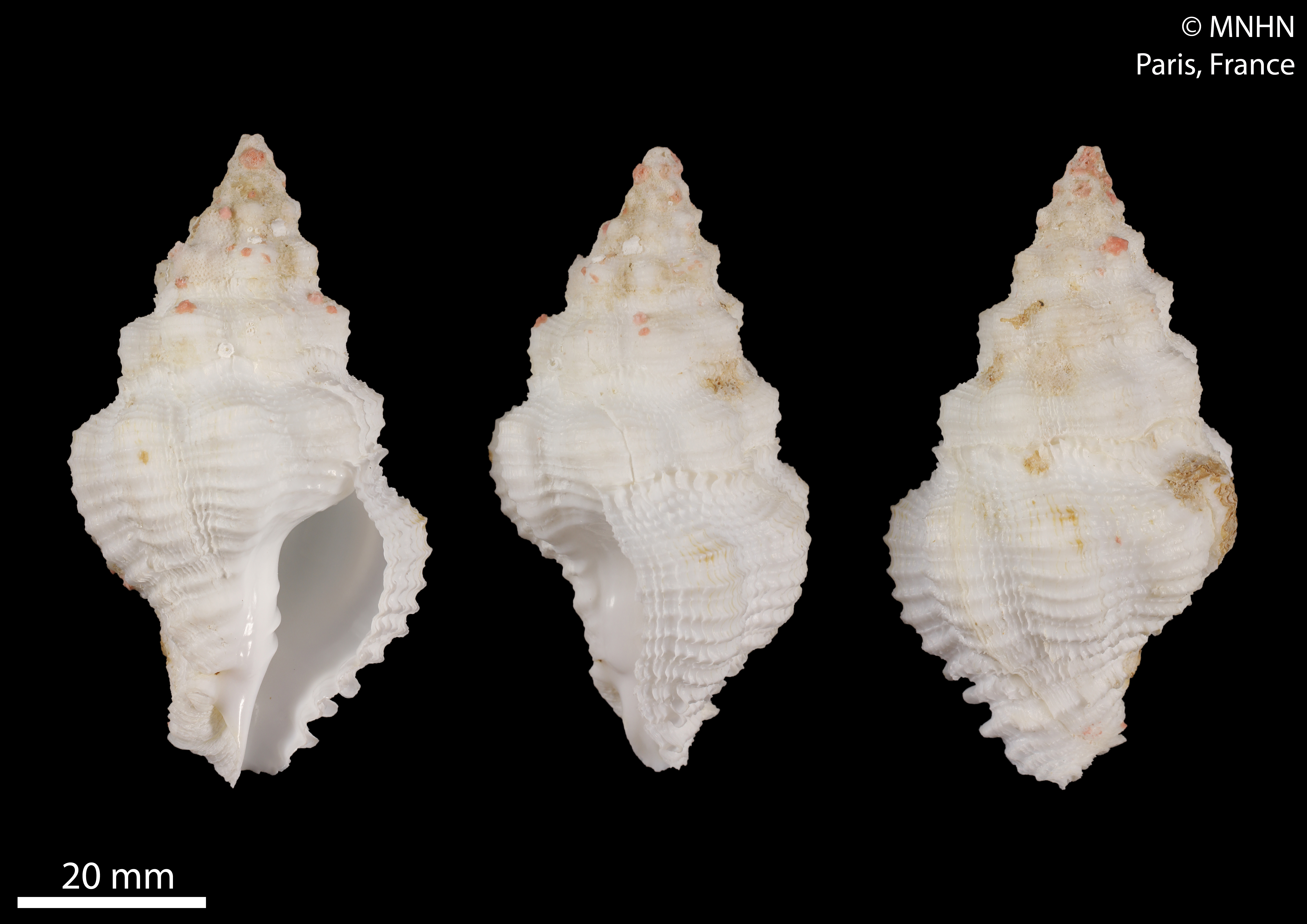
- Shell of Altivasum profundum (paratype at MNHN, Paris)

Scientific classification
- Kingdom: Animalia
- Phylum: Mollusca
- Class: Gastropoda
- Subclass: Caenogastropoda
- Order: Neogastropoda
- Family: Vasidae
- Genus: Altivasum
- Species: A. profundum

Binomial name
- Altivasum profundum Dekkers & S. J. Maxwell, 2018

= Altivasum profundum =

Genus of gastropods

Altivasum profundum is a species of deepwater sea snails, marine gastropod molluscs in the family Vasidae.

== Distribution ==
This marine species is endemic to Australia and was found off Western Australia at a depth of 162 m.
