= Altivasum pauladellaboscae =

Scientific classification
- Kingdom: Animalia
- Phylum: Mollusca
- Class: Gastropoda
- Subclass: Caenogastropoda
- Order: Neogastropoda
- Family: Vasidae
- Genus: Altivasum
- Species: A. pauladellaboscae

Binomial name
- Altivasum pauladellaboscae M. Cooper & S. J. Maxwell, 2020

Genus of gastropods

Altivasum pauladellaboscae is a species of deepwater sea snails, marine gastropod molluscs in the family Vasidae.

== Distribution ==
This marine species is endemic to Australia and occurs off Western Australia.
