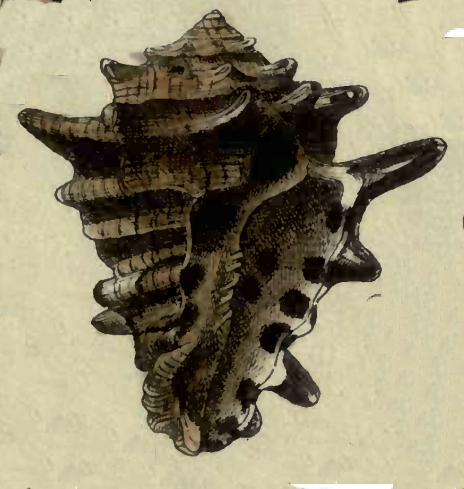
- Drawing of a shell of Florivasum tubiferum

Scientific classification
- Kingdom: Animalia
- Phylum: Mollusca
- Class: Gastropoda
- Subclass: Caenogastropoda
- Order: Neogastropoda
- Superfamily: Turbinelloidea
- Family: Vasidae
- Genus: Florivasum
- Species: F. tubiferum

Binomial name
- Florivasum tubiferum (Anton, 1838)

Synonyms
- Turbinella tubifera Anton, 1838 superseded combination (original combination); Turbinellus imperialis Reeve, 1842; Vasum tubiferum (Anton, 1838) superseded combination

= Florivasum tubiferum =

Species of gastropod

Florivasum tubiferum is a species of large predatory sea snail, a marine gastropod mollusk within the family Vasidae.

== Description ==
The length of the shell varies between 60 mm to 116 mm.

The shell resembles Vasum turbinellus (Linnaeus, 1758) but has five columellar plicae. The parietal wall is purple-brown. The smooth aperture is white within.

The shell is yellowish white and chestnut-black, stained and obscurely banded. The aperture is yellowish white. The border of the outer lip is black-spotted.

== Distribution ==
This marine species occurs off the Philippines
