= Globivasum pugnus =

Scientific classification
- Kingdom: Animalia
- Phylum: Mollusca
- Class: Gastropoda
- Subclass: Caenogastropoda
- Order: Neogastropoda
- Superfamily: Turbinelloidea
- Family: Vasidae
- Genus: Globivasum
- Species: †G. pugnus

Binomial name
- †Globivasum pugnus (Pilsbry and Johnson, 1917)

Synonyms
- † Vasum pugnus Pilsbry & C. W. Johnson, 1917 superseded combination

Species of gastropod

Globivasum pugnus is an extinct species of medium to large sea snail, a marine gastropod mollusk in the family Vasidae.

== Description ==
Measurements of the (incomplete) shell is 71.6 mm x 35.5 mm.
