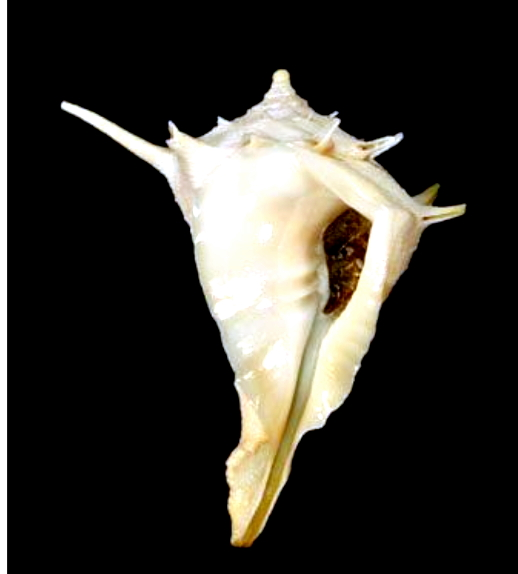
- Shell of Afrivasum zanzibaricum (specimen at the Natural History Museum Rotterdam)

Scientific classification
- Kingdom: Animalia
- Phylum: Mollusca
- Class: Gastropoda
- Subclass: Caenogastropoda
- Order: Neogastropoda
- Family: Vasidae
- Genus: Afrivasum
- Species: A. zanzibaricum

Binomial name
- Afrivasum zanzibaricum (Abbott, 1958)

Synonyms
- Tudicula zanzibarica Abbott, 1958; Tudivasum zanzibaricum (Abbott, 1958) superseded combination

= Afrivasum zanzibaricum =

Species of gastropod

Afrivasum zanzibaricum, common name the Zanzibar tudicula, is a species of large sea snail, a marine gastropod mollusc in the family Vasidae.

== Description ==
The shell can reach a length of 53 mm.

== Distribution ==
This species occurs in the Indian Ocean off Zanzibar.
