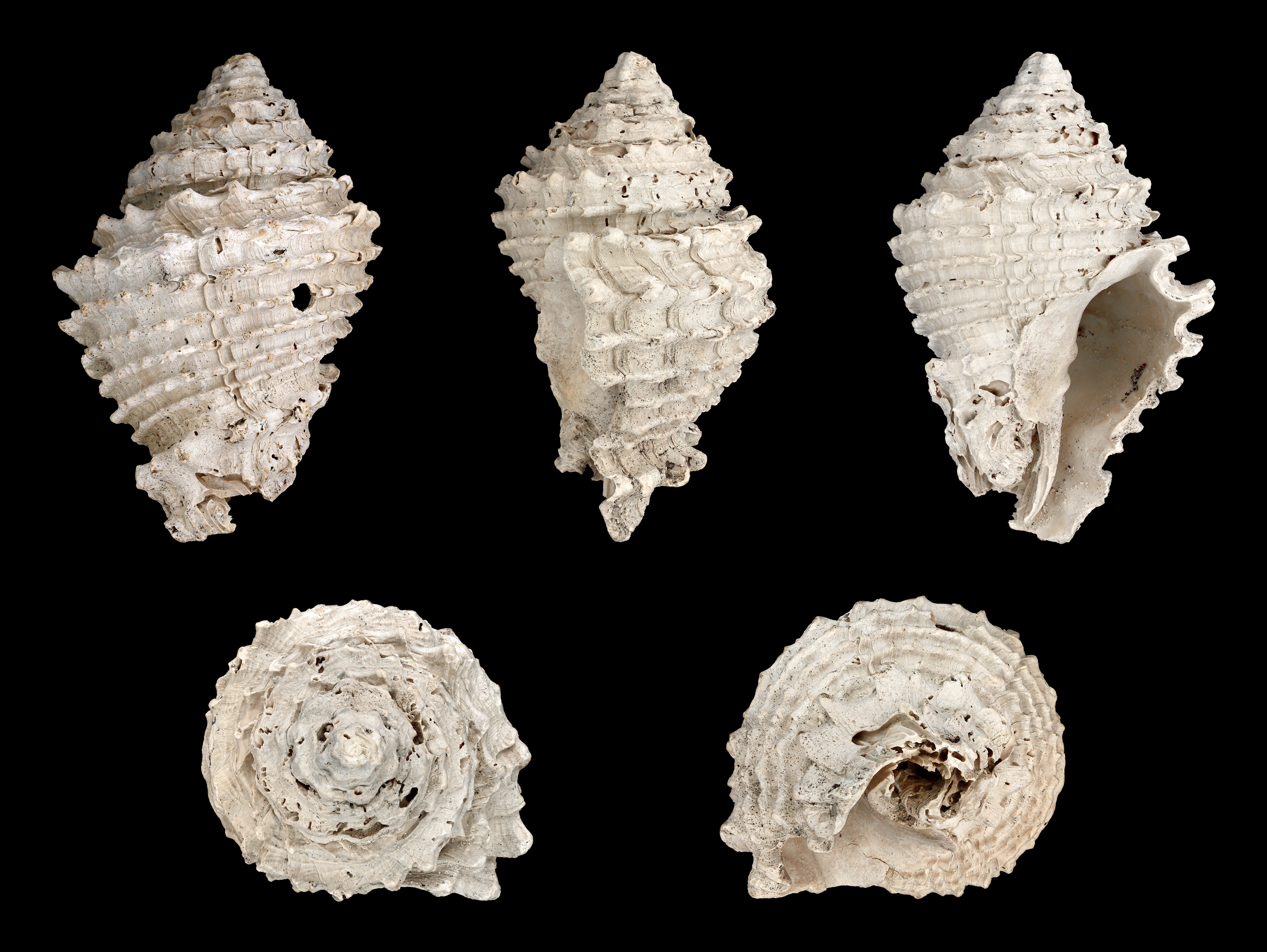
- Five views of a fossil shell of Hystrivasum squamosum (Hollister 1971)

Scientific classification
- Kingdom: Animalia
- Phylum: Mollusca
- Class: Gastropoda
- Subclass: Caenogastropoda
- Order: Neogastropoda
- Family: Turbinellidae
- Genus: Hystrivasum
- Species: H. squamosum

Binomial name
- Hystrivasum squamosum (Hollister, 1971)

= Hystrivasum squamosum =

Hystrivasum

Extinct species of gastropod

Hystrivasum squamosum is an extinct species of medium-sized fossil sea snail, a predatory marine gastropod in the family Turbinellidae.
