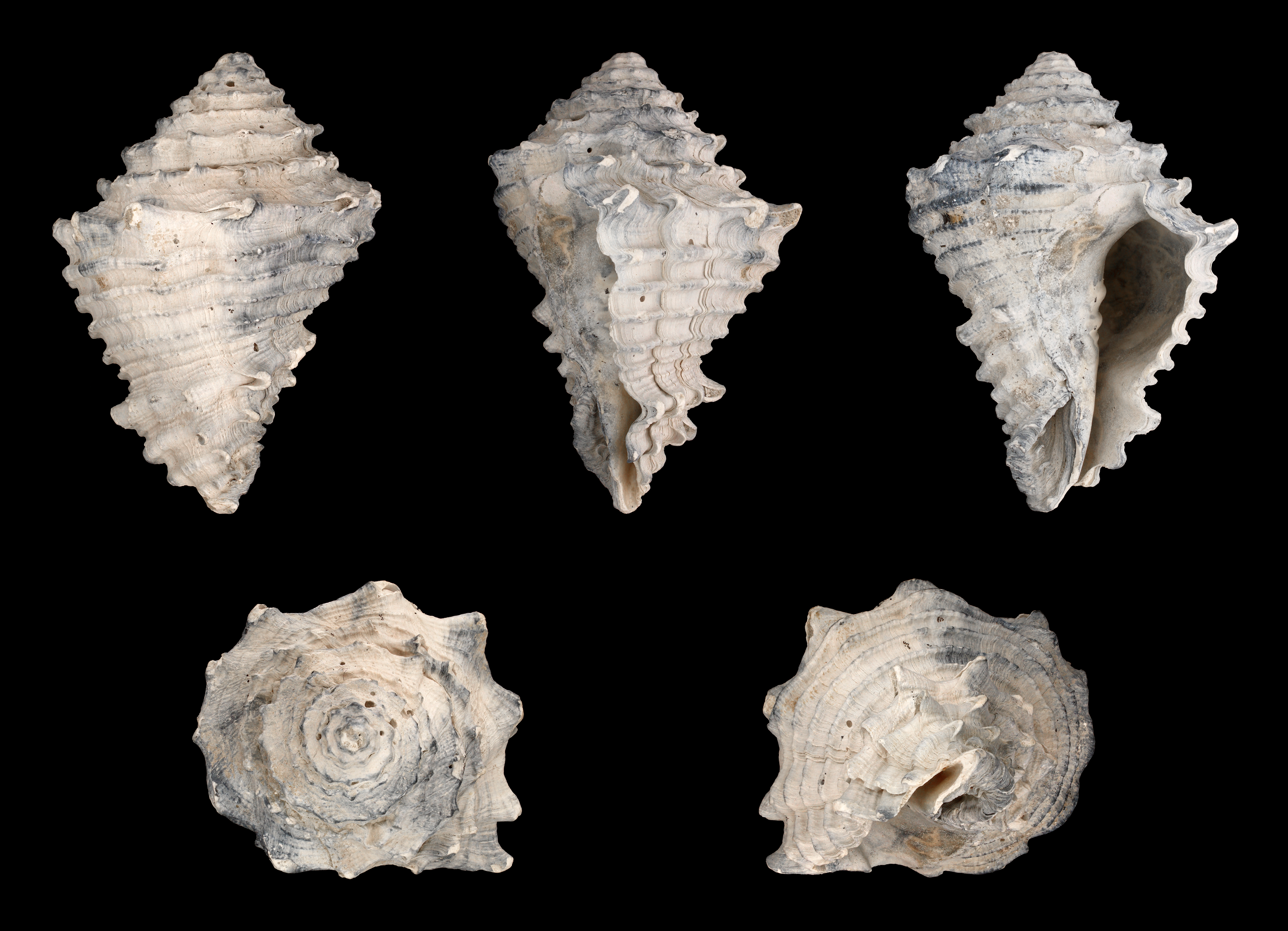
- Hystrivasu horridum Heilprin from the Pliestiocene of Florida

Scientific classification
- Kingdom: Animalia
- Phylum: Mollusca
- Class: Gastropoda
- Subclass: Caenogastropoda
- Order: Neogastropoda
- Family: Turbinellidae
- Genus: Hystrivasum
- Species: H. horridum

Binomial name
- Hystrivasum horridum (Heilprin, 1886)

= Hystrivasum horridum =

Extinct species of gastropod

Hystrivasum horridum, common name the rough or shaggy vase, is a fossil species of medium-sized predatory gastropod in the family Turbinellidae. This species is extinct and is found in the Pleistocene deposits of Florida.

== Etymology ==
The specific name horridum is Latin for "rough" or "shaggy" and does not mean "horrid".

== Shell description ==
Like other species in the subfamily Vasinae, Hystrivasum horridum shells are large, thick and heavy. They are vase-shaped, in the sense that they are biconical. The shells have moderate spires, and have several plaits on the columella.

Hystrivasum horridum, formerly Vasum horridum, belongs to an extinct group that is easily distinguished from modern Vasum by the presence of two sets of spines or nodes located on the shoulder of the whorls. These spines can be found at the suture and at the periphery of the shoulder. H. horridum has 12-15 wide, scoop-like spines that project almost horizontally from the shoulder. Also, H. horridum has a pronounced "waist-like" constriction at the base of the shell. These characteristics set it apart from other members of the group.

Hystrivasum horridum is known only from the Pleistocene of Florida. It is "one of the most characteristic and elegant fossils of the Caloosahatchee marl." It was first described by Angelo Heilprin in 1886. The famous malacologist William Healey Dall stated that this "magnificent species seems to be confined to [the Pliocene Caloosahatchie Beds] and to have given rise to no descendant in the recent fauna.”

== See also ==
- The Paleobiology Database
