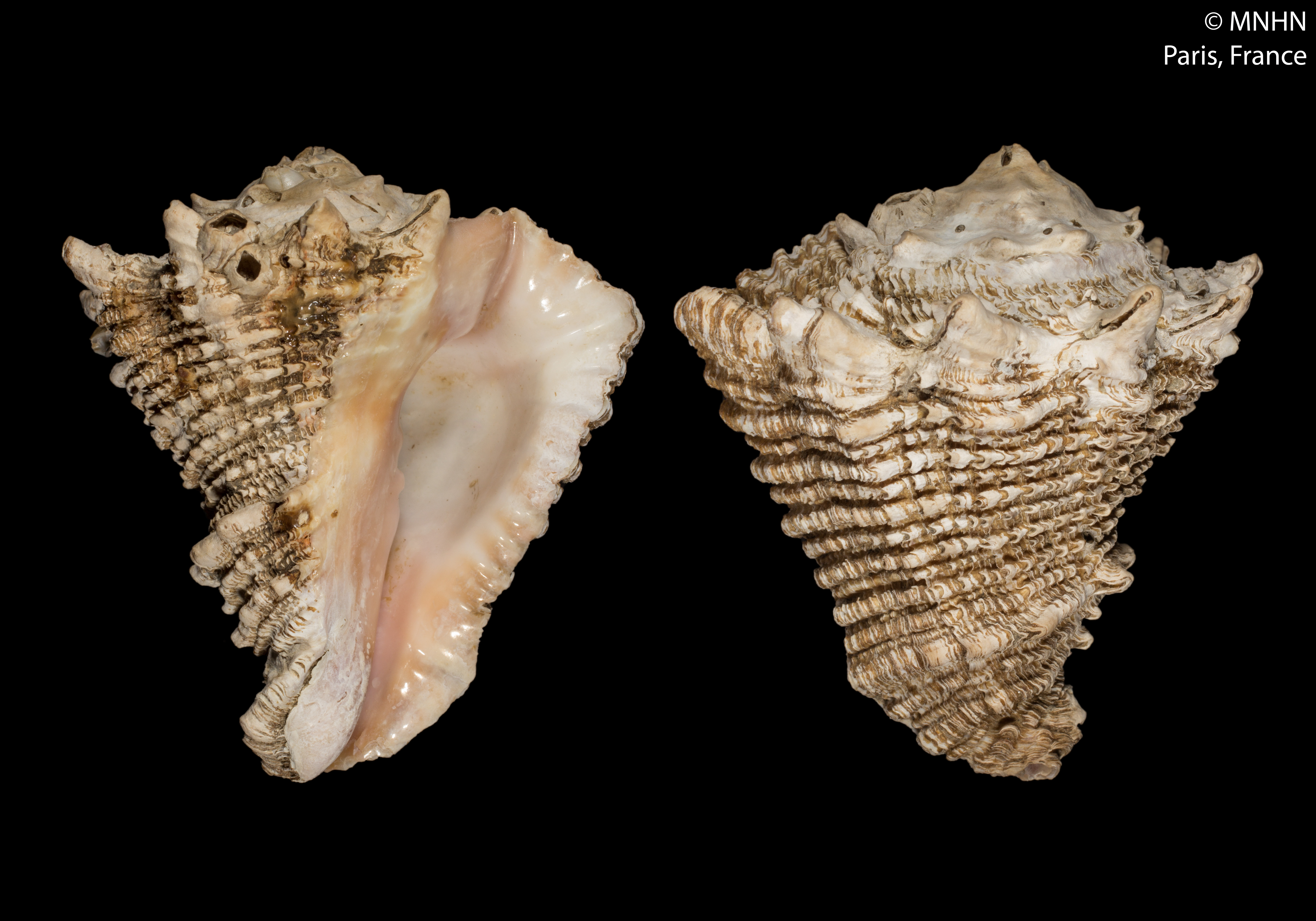
- Shell of Aristovasum cassiforme (syntype at MNHN, Paris)

Scientific classification
- Kingdom: Animalia
- Phylum: Mollusca
- Class: Gastropoda
- Subclass: Caenogastropoda
- Order: Neogastropoda
- Family: Vasidae
- Genus: Aristovasum; Vermeij, 2024

Type species
- Turbinella cassiformis Kiener, 1840

= Aristovasum =

Genus of gastropods

Aristovasum is a genus of large sea snails, marine gastropod mollusks in the subfamily Vasinae, the vase shells, within the family Vasidae.

== Species ==
- Aristovasum cassiforme (Kiener, 1840)
- † Aristovasum chipolense (E. H. Vokes, 1966)
