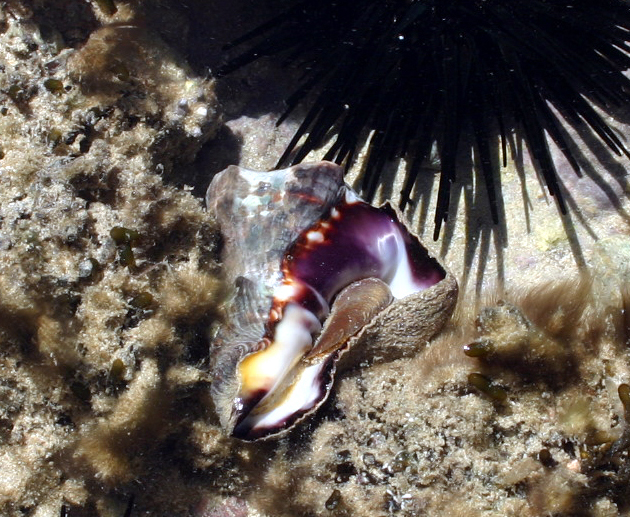
- Rhinovasum rhinoceros in a tide pool in Mombasa, Kenya, Africa

Scientific classification
- Kingdom: Animalia
- Phylum: Mollusca
- Class: Gastropoda
- Subclass: Caenogastropoda
- Order: Neogastropoda
- Superfamily: Turbinelloidea
- Family: Vasidae
- Genus: †Rhinovasum
- Species: †R. rhinoceros

Binomial name
- †Rhinovasum rhinoceros (Gmelin, 1791)

Synonyms
- Vasum rhinoceros (Gmelin, 1791) superseded combination; Voluta rhinoceros Gmelin, 1791 ·

= Rhinovasum rhinoceros =

Species of gastropod

Rhinovasum rhinoceros, common name the rhinoceros vase snail or rhinoceros vase shell, is a species of large predatory sea snail, a marine gastropod mollusk within the family Vasidae.

Subspecies

- Rhinovasum rhinoceros attolinoi (T. Cossignani, 2017)
- Rhinovasum rhinoceros rhinoceros (Gmelin, 1791)

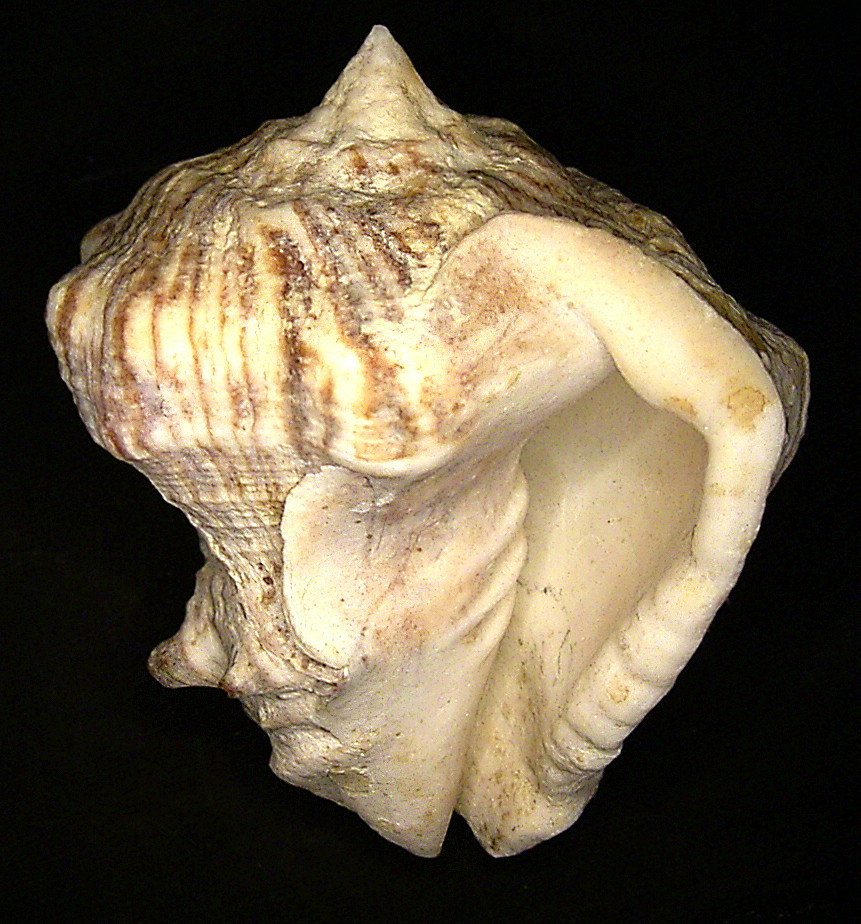
Rhinivasum rhinoceros shell

== Description ==
The length of the shell: up to 90 mm, similar to Vasum turbinellus, in shape, but more rosy pink with light brown patches. The parietal wall is yellow-brown.The columella is wide, orange pink, with only three folds and large nodules on the shoulder. (Richmond, 1997).

== Distribution ==
This species occurs in the Western Indian Ocean off Tanzania and Kenya.

== Habitat ==
Shallow, rocky, sandy substrata.
