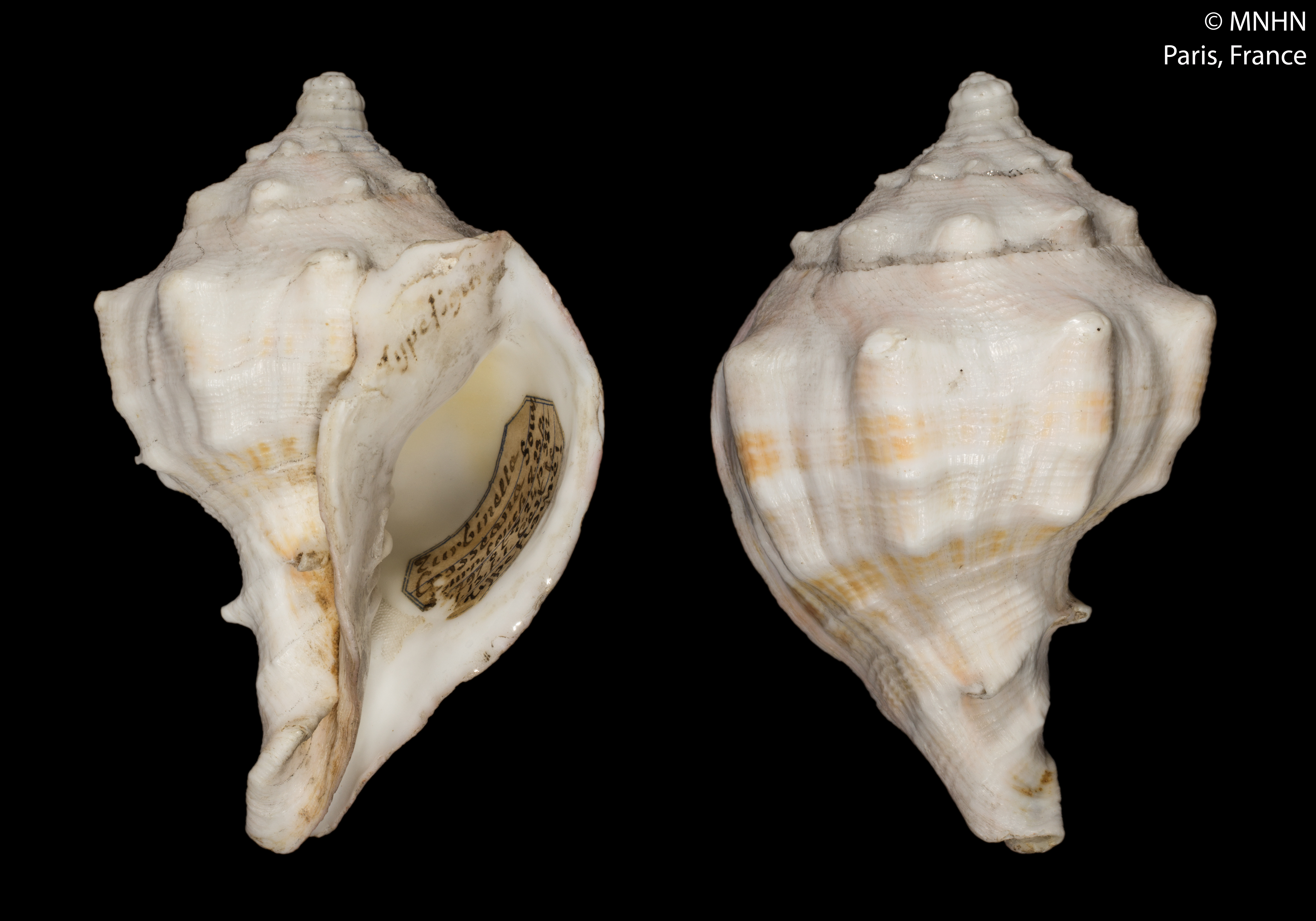
- Shell of Rhinovasum crosseanum (holotype at MNHN, Paris)

Scientific classification
- Kingdom: Animalia
- Phylum: Mollusca
- Class: Gastropoda
- Subclass: Caenogastropoda
- Order: Neogastropoda
- Superfamily: Turbinelloidea
- Family: Vasidae
- Genus: Rhinovasum
- Species: R. crosseanum

Binomial name
- Rhinovasum crosseanum (Souverbie, 1875)

Synonyms
- Turbinella crosseana Souverbie, 1875 · unaccepted (original combination); Vasum (Vasum) crosseanum (Souverbie, 1875); Vasum crosseanum (Souverbie, 1875) superseded combination

= Rhinovasum crosseanum =

Species of gastropod

Rhinovasum crosseanum, common name ceramic vase or heavy whelk, is a species of medium to large sea snail, a marine gastropod mollusk in the family Vasidae.

== Description ==
Rhinovasum crosseanum has a large, thick and heavy pyriform shell that reaches a length of 95 mm and a maximum width of 65 mm.. The shell contains eight whorls with a spiral sculpture of uneven, rough threads. There are five columellar plicae.

== Distribution ==
This rare species occurs off Mauritius.

== Habitat ==
This sea snail lives on lower eulittoral, rocky areas at depth of 10 to 40 m.
