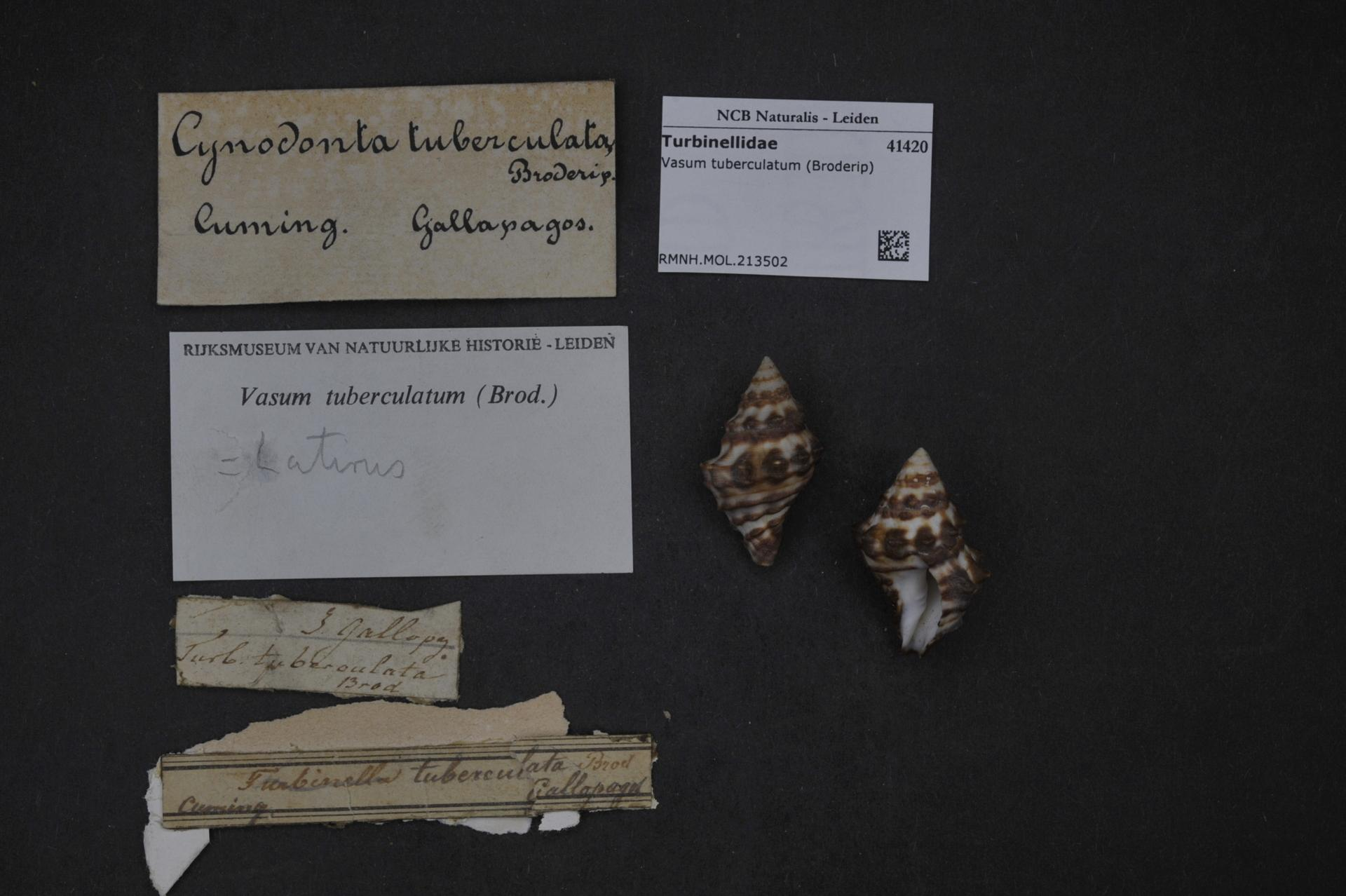
- Shell of Rhinovasum tuberculatum (specimen at Naturalis Biodiversity Center)

Scientific classification
- Kingdom: Animalia
- Phylum: Mollusca
- Class: Gastropoda
- Subclass: Caenogastropoda
- Order: Neogastropoda
- Superfamily: Turbinelloidea
- Family: Vasidae
- Genus: Rhinovasum
- Species: †R. tuberculatum

Binomial name
- †Rhinovasum tuberculatum Gabb 1873

Synonyms (Vermeij, 2024)
- † Vasum tuberculatum Gabb, 1873 superseded combination

= Rhinovasum tuberculatum =

Species of gastropod

Rhinovasum tuberculatum is an extinct species of medium to large sea snail, a marine gastropod mollusk in the family Vasidae.

== Description ==
Its shell is medium to large, with 8 to 9 whorls, including a slightly concave profile on the final whorl, a feature common among the Rhinovasum genus. Its species name, tuberculatum, owes to its prominent tubercles that are arranged in rows.

One fossil record displays a shell height of 111 mm and a diameter of 86 mm, with larger specimens exceeding 120 mm in height.

== Distribution ==
Fossils of this marine species have been found in Miocene to Pliocene strata of the Dominican Republic and Venezuela (age range: 20.43 to 3.6 Ma).

== Renaming ==
R. tuberculatum was renamed from Vasum tuberculatum in 2024 as part of a comprehensive revision of the Vasidae family.
