= Globivasum dominicense =

Scientific classification
- Kingdom: Animalia
- Phylum: Mollusca
- Class: Gastropoda
- Subclass: Caenogastropoda
- Order: Neogastropoda
- Superfamily: Turbinelloidea
- Family: Vasidae
- Genus: Globivasum
- Species: †G. dominicense

Binomial name
- †Globivasum dominicense (Gabb 1873 )

Synonyms
- † Vasum dominicense Gabb, 1873 superseded combination; † Vasum dominicensis Gabb, 1873

Species of gastropod

Globivasum dominicense is an extinct species of medium to large sea snail, a marine gastropod mollusk in the family Vasidae.

== Description ==
The height of the shell: 60 mm, its diameter is 37 mm.

== Distribution ==
Fossils of this marine species have been found in Pliocene strata of the Dominican Republic. (age range: 5.332 to 3.6 Ma)
