= Rhinovasum aquitanicum =

Scientific classification
- Kingdom: Animalia
- Phylum: Mollusca
- Class: Gastropoda
- Subclass: Caenogastropoda
- Order: Neogastropoda
- Superfamily: Turbinelloidea
- Family: Vasidae
- Genus: Rhinovasum
- Species: †R. aquitanicum

Binomial name
- †Rhinovasum aquitanicum (Peyrot 1928)

Synonyms
- †Vasum aquitanicum Peyrot, 1928 superseded combination; † Vasum subpugillare mut. aquitanicum Peyrot, 1928 (basionym)

Species of gastropod

Rhinovasum aquitanicum is an extinct species of medium to large sea snail, a marine gastropod mollusk in the family Vasidae.

== Distribution ==
Fossils of this marine species have been found in Oligocene of the Adour region in France.
