= Globivasum suwanneense =

Scientific classification
- Kingdom: Animalia
- Phylum: Mollusca
- Class: Gastropoda
- Subclass: Caenogastropoda
- Order: Neogastropoda
- Superfamily: Turbinelloidea
- Family: Vasidae
- Genus: Globivasum
- Species: †G. suwanneense

Binomial name
- †Globivasum suwanneense (Petuch 1997)

Synonyms
- † Vasum suwanneense Petuch, 1997 superseded combination; † Vasum suwanneensis Petuch, 1997 incorrect grammatical agreement of specific epithet

Species of gastropod

Globivasum suwanneensis is an extinct species of medium to large sea snail, a marine gastropod mollusk in the family Vasidae.

== Description ==
Measurements of the (incomplete) shell: 39.0 x 23.0 mm.

== Distribution ==
Fossils of this species were found in Oligocene strata in Florida, USA.
