= Afrivasum =

Scientific classification
- Kingdom: Animalia
- Phylum: Mollusca
- Class: Gastropoda
- Subclass: Caenogastropoda
- Order: Neogastropoda
- Family: Vasidae
- Genus: Afrivasum; Y. Zheng, S. J. Maxwell & Dekkers, 2026

Type species
- Tudicula zanzibarica Abbott, 1958

Genus of gastropods

Afrivasum is a genus of large sea snails, marine gastropod mollusks in the subfamily Vasinae, the vase shells, within the family Vasidae.

== Species ==
Species within the genus Afrivasum include:

- Afrivasum simonaikeni (T. Cossignani, 2024)
- Afrivasum zanzibaricum (Abbott, 1958)
