= Globivasum aedificatum =

Scientific classification
- Kingdom: Animalia
- Phylum: Mollusca
- Class: Gastropoda
- Subclass: Caenogastropoda
- Order: Neogastropoda
- Superfamily: Turbinelloidea
- Family: Vasidae
- Genus: Globivasum
- Species: †G. aedificatum

Binomial name
- †Globivasum aedificatum Guppy 1876

Synonyms
- † Turbinellus aedificatus Guppy 1876; † Vasum aedificatum (Guppy, 1876) superseded combination

Species of gastropod

Globivasum aedificatum is an extinct species of medium to large sea snail, a marine gastropod mollusk in the family Vasidae.

== Description ==
G. aedificatum is carnivorous. Measurements of the shell are 62.6 mm x 33.3 mm.

== Distribution ==
Fossils of this marine species have been found in Miocene to Pliocene strata of the Dominican Republic (age range: 7.246 to 5.332 Ma).
