= Globivasum =

Scientific classification
- Kingdom: Animalia
- Phylum: Mollusca
- Class: Gastropoda
- Subclass: Caenogastropoda
- Order: Neogastropoda
- Superfamily: Turbinelloidea
- Family: Vasidae
- Genus: Globivasum; Abbott, 1950

Type species
- Turbinella nuttingi J. B. Henderson, 1919

Synonyms
- Vasum (Globivasum) Abbott, 1950 superseded rank

Genus of gastropods

Globivasum, common name the vase snails or vase shells, is a genus of mostly rather large predatory sea snails, marine gastropod mollusks in the family Vasidae.

== Species ==
- † Globivasum aedificatum (Guppy, 1876)
- † Globivasum cancellatum (Grateloup, 1845)
- Globivasum capitellum (Linnaeus, 1758)
- † Globivasum dominicense (Gabb, 1873)
- † Globivasum elongatum (E. H. Vokes, 1970)
- Globivasum globulus (Lamarck, 1816)
- † Globivasum gurabicum (Maury, 1917)
- † Globivasum humerosum (Vaughan, 1896)
- † Globivasum intermedium (Grateloup, 1832)
- † Globivasum kraatzi (C. S. Ferreira & O. R. Cunha, 1957)
- † Globivasum omanicum (Harzhauser, 2007)
- † Globivasum pugnus (Pilsbry & C. W. Johnson, 1917)
- † Globivasum subcapitellum (Heilprin, 1886)
- † Globivasum suwanneense (Petuch, 1997)
- Globivasum whicheri Petuch, 2013
