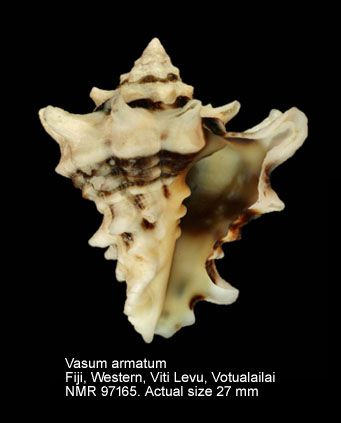
- Shell of Vasum armatum

Scientific classification
- Kingdom: Animalia
- Phylum: Mollusca
- Class: Gastropoda
- Subclass: Caenogastropoda
- Order: Neogastropoda
- Superfamily: Turbinelloidea
- Family: Vasidae
- Genus: Vasum
- Species: V. armatum

Binomial name
- Vasum armatum (Broderip, 1833)

Synonyms
- Turbinella armata Broderip, 1833 (original combination)

= Vasum armatum =

Species of gastropod

Vasum armatum, common name the helmet vase, is a species of medium to large sea snail, a marine gastropod mollusk in the family Vasidae.

== Distribution ==
This marine species occurs off French Polynesia

== Shell description ==
The shell is yellowish white and black, variegated, stained and irregularly banded. The outer lip usually black-bordered within.
