= Florivasum =

Scientific classification
- Kingdom: Animalia
- Phylum: Mollusca
- Class: Gastropoda
- Subclass: Caenogastropoda
- Order: Neogastropoda
- Superfamily: Turbinelloidea
- Family: Vasidae
- Genus: Florivasum; Vermeij, 2024

Type species
- Turbinella tubifera Anton, 1838

Genus of gastropods

Florivasum, common name the vase snails or vase shells, is a genus of mostly rather large predatory sea snails, marine gastropod mollusks in the family Vasidae.

== Species ==
- Florivasum lactisfloris (Ferrario, 1983)
- Florivasum stephanti (W. K. Emerson & Sage, 1988)
- Florivasum tubiferum (Anton, 1838)
