= Globivasum omanicum =

Scientific classification
- Kingdom: Animalia
- Phylum: Mollusca
- Class: Gastropoda
- Subclass: Caenogastropoda
- Order: Neogastropoda
- Superfamily: Turbinelloidea
- Family: Vasidae
- Genus: Globivasum
- Species: †G. omanicum

Binomial name
- †Globivasum omanicum (Harzhauser, 2007)

Synonyms
- † Vasum omanicum Harzhauser, 2007 superseded combination

Species of gastropod

Globivasum omanicum is an extinct species of medium to large sea snail, a marine gastropod mollusk in the family Vasidae.

== Distribution ==
Fossils of this marine species have been found in Miocene strata in Oman (age range: 28.4 to 23.03 Ma)
