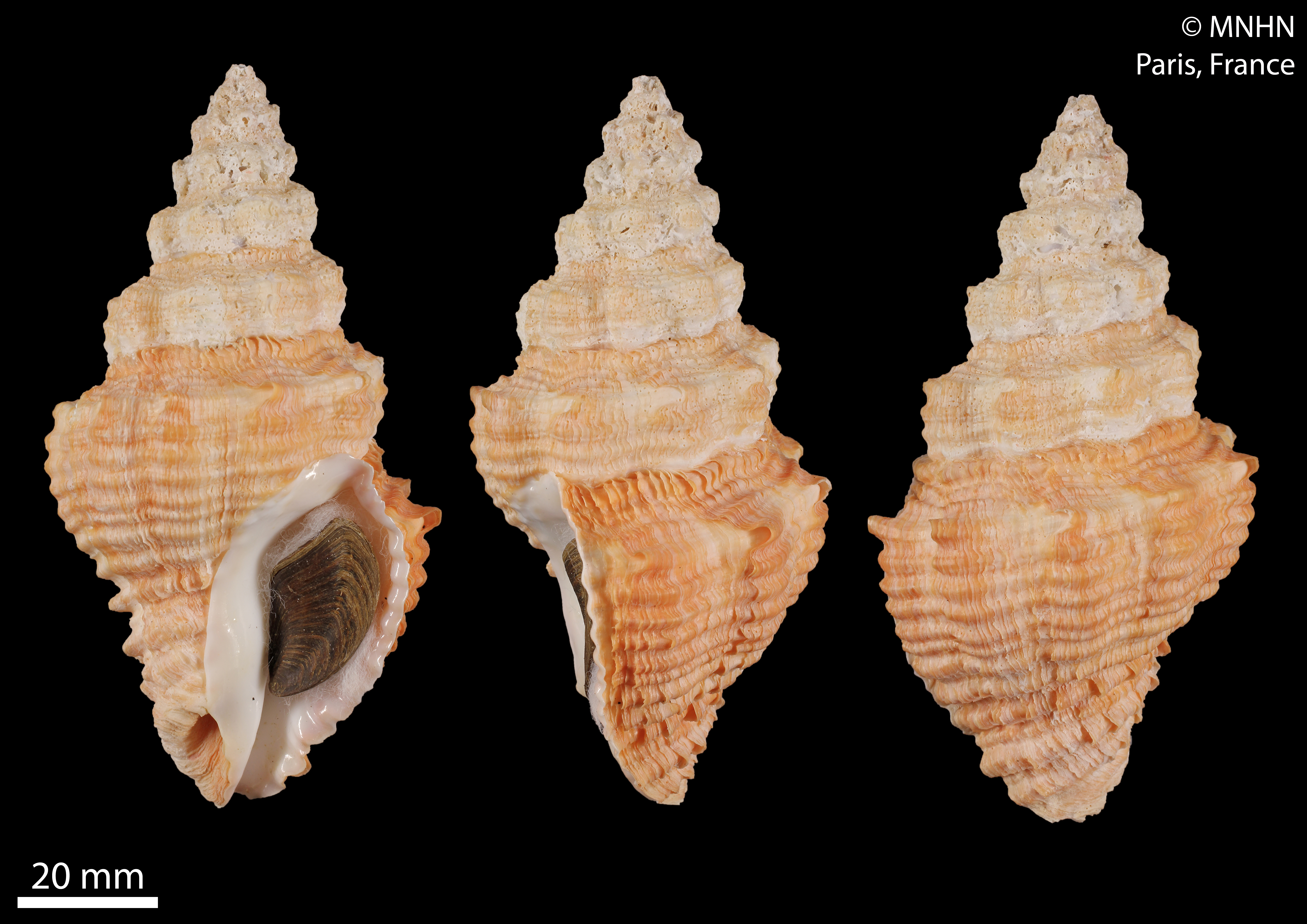
- Shell of Altivasum flindersi (specimen at MNHN, Paris)

Scientific classification
- Kingdom: Animalia
- Phylum: Mollusca
- Class: Gastropoda
- Subclass: Caenogastropoda
- Order: Neogastropoda
- Family: Vasidae
- Genus: Altivasum
- Species: A. flindersi

Binomial name
- Altivasum flindersi Verco, 1914

Synonyms
- Altivasum aurantiacum Hedley, 1914; Altivasum typicum Hedley, 1916; Latirus aurantiacus Verco, 1895 (invalid: junior homonym of Latirus aurantiacus Montfort, 1810; Altivasum flindersi and A. typicum are replacement names); Vasum flindersi (Verco, 1914) ·

= Altivasum flindersi =

Genus of gastropods

Altivasum flindersi is a species of sea snails, marine gastropod molluscs in the family Vasidae.

== Description ==
The length of the shell attains 130 mm, its diameter 65 mm.

(Original description) The shell is large, yet relatively light and thin for its size, with an ovate-acuminate shape and a broad, deep perforation. Its color is a uniform salmon red.

The shell consists of eleven gradate whorls that increase gradually in size, are angled at the suture, and contract at the base before extending into the siphonal canal. The apex is mucronate, composed of two smooth whorls. The epidermis is thin, membranous, and easily shredded.

Sculpture: Broad, low radial ribs ascend the spire obliquely at a rate of about a dozen per whorl, disappearing on the body whorl. Eight spiral cords are present, with the four lower ones spaced wider than those above, two of which extend up the spire. Each cord carries distant, high vaulted scales that sometimes project into long spines, especially on the shoulder and base, with about 12 to 15 scales per whorl. Additionally, there is an unarmed spiral beneath the suture and another bordering the umbilicus. The perforation is broad, deep, and expands into a spiral tube penetrating earlier whorls. Its surface is spirally grooved and transversely scaled.

The aperture is elliptical, with the outer lip fringed by developing scales. The inner lip adheres briefly to the preceding whorl before becoming free along the remainder of its course. The aperture is slightly channeled above, transitioning below into a short, narrow, recurved siphonal canal. Deep within the aperture, low on the columella, are three prominent and well-spaced plaits, the lowest of which nearly overlaps the umbilical margin of the preceding whorl.

== Distribution ==
This marine species is endemic to Australia and occurs off South Australia and Western Australia.
