= Siphovasum =

Scientific classification
- Kingdom: Animalia
- Phylum: Mollusca
- Class: Gastropoda
- Subclass: Caenogastropoda
- Order: Neogastropoda
- Family: Vasidae
- Genus: Siphovasum; Rehder & Abbott, 1950

Synonyms
- Vasum (Siphovasum) Rehder & Abbott, 1951 · unaccepted > superseded rank

Genus of gastropods

Siphovasum is a genus of large sea snails, marine gastropod mollusks in the subfamily Vasinae, the vase shells, within the family Vasidae.

== Species ==
Species within the genus include:

- Siphovasum latiriforme (Rehder & Abbott, 1951)
