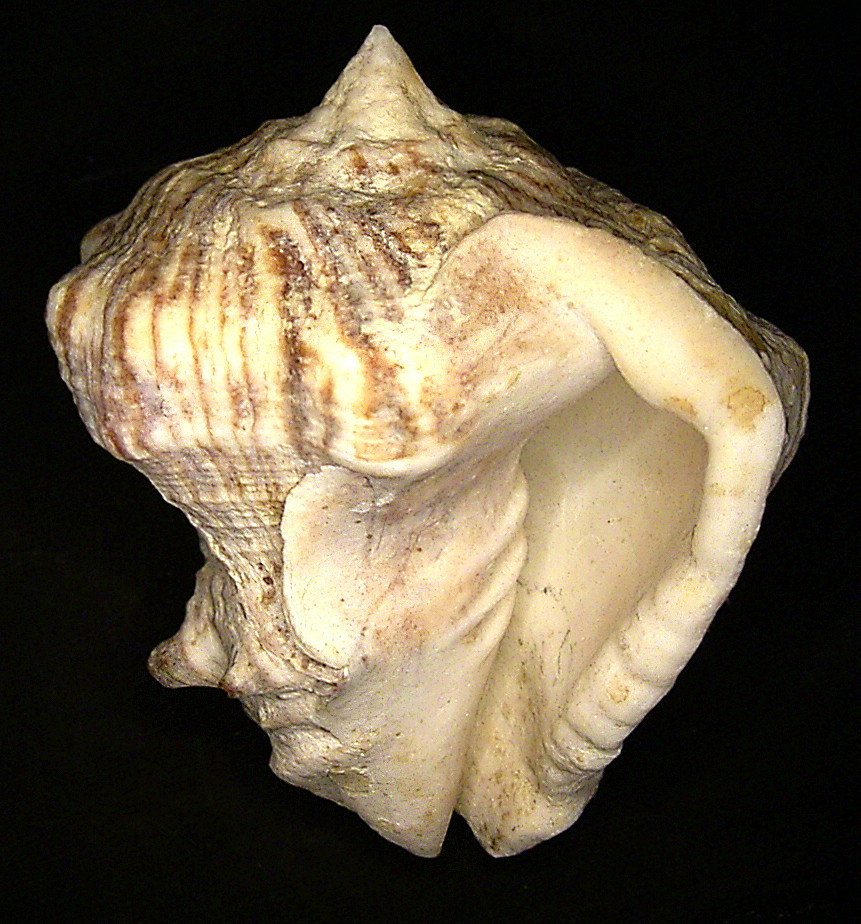
- Shell of Rhinovasum rhinoceros

Scientific classification
- Kingdom: Animalia
- Phylum: Mollusca
- Class: Gastropoda
- Subclass: Caenogastropoda
- Order: Neogastropoda
- Family: Vasidae
- Genus: Rhinovasum; Vermeij, 2024

Type species
- Voluta rhinoceros Gmelin, 1791

= Rhinovasum =

Genus of gastropods

Rhinovasum is a genus of large sea snails, marine gastropod mollusks in the subfamily Vasinae, the vase shells, within the family Vasidae.

== Species ==
Species within the genus Rhinovasum include:

- † Rhinovasum aquitanicum (Peyrot, 1928)
- Rhinovasum crosseanum (Souverbie, 1875)
- Rhinovasum rhinoceros (Gmelin, 1791)
- † Rhinovasum subpugillare (A. d'Orbigny, 1852)
- Rhinovasum triangulare (E. A. Smith, 1902)
- Rhinovasum truncatum (G. B. Sowerby III, 1892)
- † Rhinovasum tuberculatum (Gabb, 1873)
