= Globivasum gurabicum =

Scientific classification
- Kingdom: Animalia
- Phylum: Mollusca
- Class: Gastropoda
- Subclass: Caenogastropoda
- Order: Neogastropoda
- Superfamily: Turbinelloidea
- Family: Vasidae
- Genus: Globivasum
- Species: †G. gurabicum

Binomial name
- †Globivasum gurabicum (Maury 1917)

Synonyms
- † Vasum dominicense var. gurabicum Maury, 1917 · > superseded combination; † Vasum gurabicum Maury, 1917 † · > superseded combination

Species of gastropod

Globivasum gurabicum (original: Vasum dominicense var. gurabicum) is an extinct species of medium to large sea snail, a marine gastropod mollusk in the family Vasidae.

== Description ==
The height of the shell is 37 mm, its diameter is 24 mm.

== Distribution ==
Fossils of this marine species have been found in Miocene and Pliocene strata of the Dominican Republic. (age range: 5.332 to 3.6 Ma).
