= Rhinovasum subpugillare =

Scientific classification
- Kingdom: Animalia
- Phylum: Mollusca
- Class: Gastropoda
- Subclass: Caenogastropoda
- Order: Neogastropoda
- Superfamily: Turbinelloidea
- Family: Vasidae
- Genus: Rhinovasum
- Species: †R. subpugillare

Binomial name
- †Rhinovasum subpugillare (d'Orbigny, 1852)

Synonyms
- † Turbinella subpugillaris A. d'Orbigny, 1852 superseded combination; † Vasum subpugillare (A. d'Orbigny, 1852) superseded combination

Species of gastropod

Rhinovasum subpugillare is an extinct species of medium to large sea snail, a marine gastropod mollusk in the family Vasidae.

== Distribution ==
Fossils of this marine species have been found in Oligocene strata in France.
