= Globivasum intermedium =

Scientific classification
- Kingdom: Animalia
- Phylum: Mollusca
- Class: Gastropoda
- Subclass: Caenogastropoda
- Order: Neogastropoda
- Superfamily: Turbinelloidea
- Family: Vasidae
- Genus: Globivasum
- Species: †G. intermedium

Binomial name
- †Globivasum intermedium (Grateloup, 1832)

Synonyms
- † Turbinella intermedia Grateloup, 1832 (original combination); † Turbinella submuricata d'Orbigny, 1852; † Vasum intermedium (Grateloup, 1832) superseded combination

Species of gastropod

Globivasum intermedium is an extinct species of medium to large sea snail, a marine gastropod mollusk in the family Vasidae. Originally called as Turbinella intermedia by Jean-Pierre-Louis Grateloup in 1852, the old term was originally from Oligocene fossils in southwestern France.

== Description ==
The height of the shell attains 65 mm.

== Distribution ==
Fossils of this marine species have been found in Oligocene strata of the Adour Basin, France.
