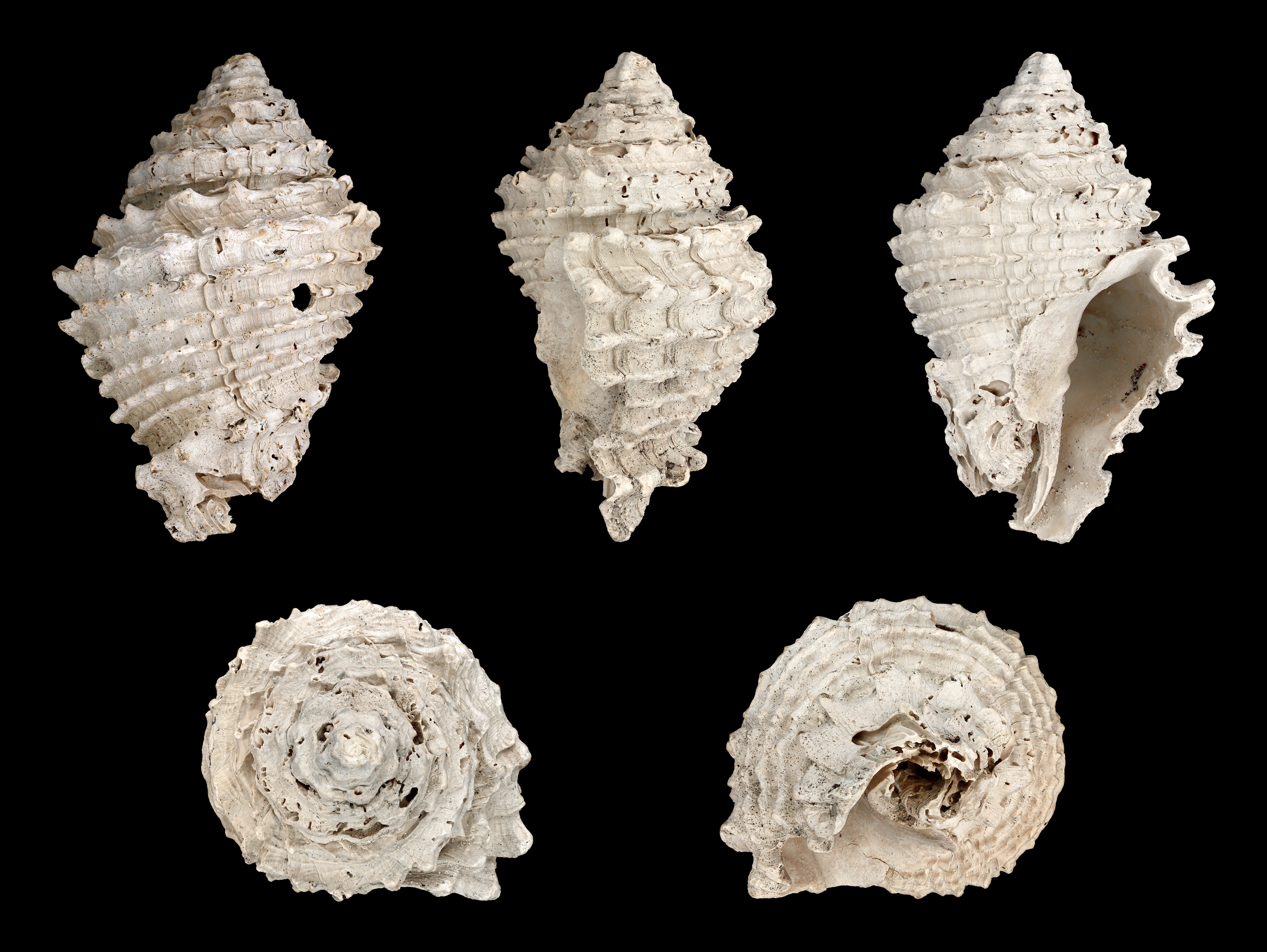
- Five views of a fossil shell of Hystrivasum squamosum (Hollister 1971)

Scientific classification
- Kingdom: Animalia
- Phylum: Mollusca
- Class: Gastropoda
- Subclass: Caenogastropoda
- Order: Neogastropoda
- Family: Turbinellidae
- Subfamily: Vasinae
- Genus: Hystrivasum; Olsson & Petit, 1964

Synonyms
- † Vasum (Hystrivasum) Olsson & Petit, 1964 superseded rank

= Hystrivasum =

Extinct genus of gastropods

Hystrivasum is an extinct genus of medium-sized fossil predatory gastropods in the family Vasidae.

The species in this genus are known from the Pliocene and Pleistocene deposits of Florida.

== Species ==
Species within the genus Hystrivasum include:

- † Hystrivasum barkleyae Petuch, 1994
- Hystrivasum chilesi Petuch, 1994
- † Hystrivasum griffini Petuch, 1994
- † Hystrivasum hertweckorum Petuch, 1994
- Hystrivasum horridum (Heilprin, 1886)
- † Hystrivasum hyshugari Petuch, 1994
- Hystrivasum jacksonense (E. H. Vokes, 1966)
- † Hystrivasum kissimeense (Hollister, 1971) †
- † Hystrivasum lindae Petuch, 1994
- Hystrivasum locklini (Olsson & Harbison, 1953)
- † Hystrivasum martinshugari Petuch, 1994
- † Hystrivasum olssoni (E. H. Vokes, 1966)
- † Hystrivasum palmerae (Hollister, 1971)
- † Hystrivasum schrinerae (Hollister, 1971)
- Hystrivasum squamosum (Hollister, 1971)
- † Hystrivasum violetae Petuch, 1994
- † Hystrivasum vokesae (Hollister, 1971)

== Exyternal links ==
- Olsson, A. A. & Petit R. E. (1964). "Some Neogene Mollusca from Florida and the Carolinas". Bulletins of American Paleontology. 47 (217): 547.
