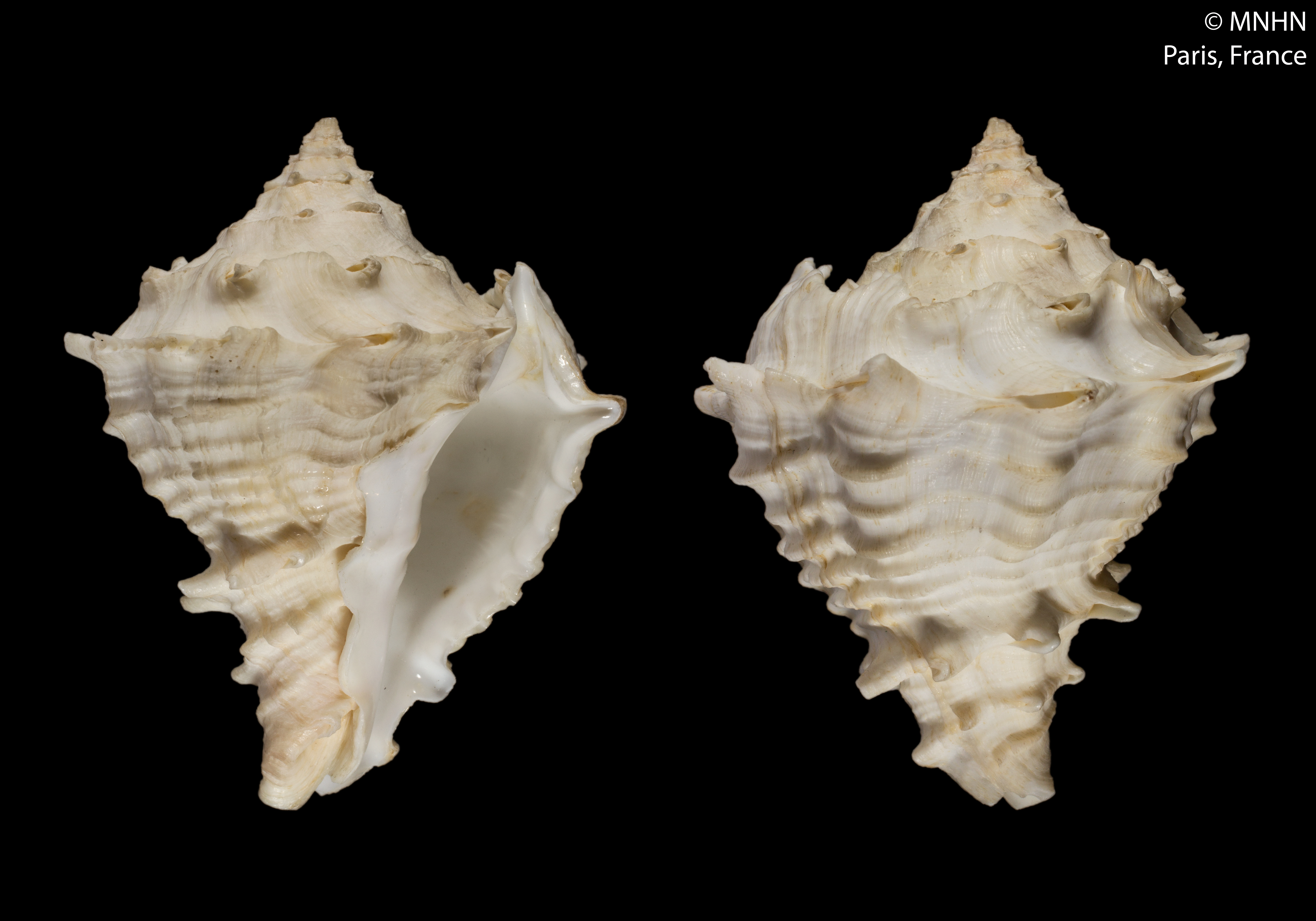
- Shell of Florivasum lactisfloris (holotype at MNHN, Paris)

Scientific classification
- Kingdom: Animalia
- Phylum: Mollusca
- Class: Gastropoda
- Subclass: Caenogastropoda
- Order: Neogastropoda
- Superfamily: Turbinelloidea
- Family: Vasidae
- Genus: Florivasum
- Species: F. lactisfloris

Binomial name
- Florivasum lactisfloris (Ferrario, 1983)

= Florivasum lactisfloris =

Species of gastropod

Florivasum lactisfloris is a rare species of medium-sized predatory sea snail, a marine gastropod mollusk in the family Turbinellidae, subfamily Vasinae, the vase snails.

== Description ==
The length of the shell attains 77 mm.

== Distribution ==
This marine species occurs off Somalia.
