= Globivasum cancellatum =

Scientific classification
- Kingdom: Animalia
- Phylum: Mollusca
- Class: Gastropoda
- Subclass: Caenogastropoda
- Order: Neogastropoda
- Superfamily: Turbinelloidea
- Family: Vasidae
- Genus: Globivasum
- Species: †G. cancellatum

Binomial name
- †Globivasum cancellatum (Grateloup, 1845)

Synonyms
- † Cynodonta crenata (Michelotti, 1861) junior subjective synonym; † Turbinella cancellata Grateloup, 1845 (original combination); † Turbinella duchassaingi Michelotti, 1861; † Vasum cancellatum (Grateloup, 1845) superseded combination; † Vasum excrenatum Sacco, 1904; † Vasum excrenatum var. duchassaingi (Michelotti, 1861); † Vasum stephanense Peyrot, 1928; † Voluta crenata Michelotti, 1861 (invalid: junior homonym of Voluta crenata Zekeli, 1852; Vasum excrenatum is a replacement name)); † Volutella crenata (Michelotti, 1861); † Volutella crenata var. bellardii Rovereto, 1900

Species of gastropod

Globivasum cancellatum is an extinct species of medium to large sea snail, a marine gastropod mollusk in the family Vasidae.

== Distribution ==
Fossils of this marine species have been found in Oligocene strata of the Landes, France.
