= Siphovasum latiriforme =

Scientific classification
- Kingdom: Animalia
- Phylum: Mollusca
- Class: Gastropoda
- Subclass: Caenogastropoda
- Order: Neogastropoda
- Superfamily: Turbinelloidea
- Family: Vasidae
- Genus: Siphovasum
- Species: S. latiriforme

Binomial name
- Siphovasum latiriforme (Rehder & Abbott, 1951)

Synonyms
- Vasum (Siphovasum) latiriforme Rehder & Abbott, 1951; Vasum latiriforme Rehder & Abbott, 1951 superseded combination

Species of gastropod

Siphovasum latiriforme is a rare species of medium-sized predatory sea snail, a marine gastropod mollusk in the family Vasidae, the vase snails.

== Description ==
The length of the shell attains 65 mm.

== Distribution ==
This marine species occurs in the Gulf of Mexico and off Tanzania.
