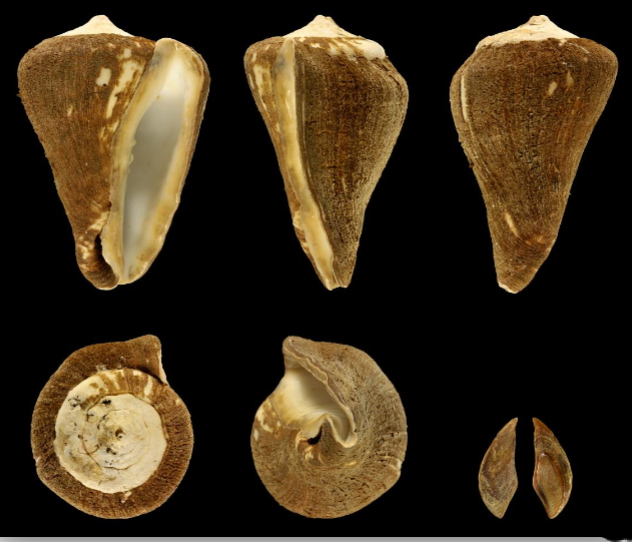
- Shell of Rhinovasum truncatum (specimen at the Smithsonian Institution)

Scientific classification
- Kingdom: Animalia
- Phylum: Mollusca
- Class: Gastropoda
- Subclass: Caenogastropoda
- Order: Neogastropoda
- Superfamily: Turbinelloidea
- Family: Vasidae
- Genus: Rhinovasum
- Species: R. truncatum

Binomial name
- Rhinovasum truncatum (G.B. Sowerby III, 1892)

Synonyms
- Turbinella truncata G. B. Sowerby III, 1892; Vasum truncatum (G.B. Sowerby III, 1892) superseded combination; Vasum truncatum truncatum (G. B. Sowerby III, 1892)

= Rhinovasum truncatum =

Species of gastropod

Rhinovasum truncatum is a species of large predatory sea snail, a marine gastropod mollusk within the family Vasidae.

== Description ==
The length of the shell attains 71 mm.

(Originally described as Turbinella truncata) The solid, white shell has a subcylindical-turbinate shape. It is truncated and obtusely angulated. The shell contains eight whorls, including two flat, papillate whorls of the protoconch. The anterior portion answering to the rostrum in the typical form as in Turbinella pyrum (Linnaeus, 1767) is quite half as broad as the widest part of the shell, and the anterior part of the elongated, white aperture is so little narrower than the posterior, that it can scarcely be called a siphonal canal. The four small, slightly oblique plaits are situated about (or a little below) the middle of the columella.

== Distribution ==
This marine species occurs off South Africa
