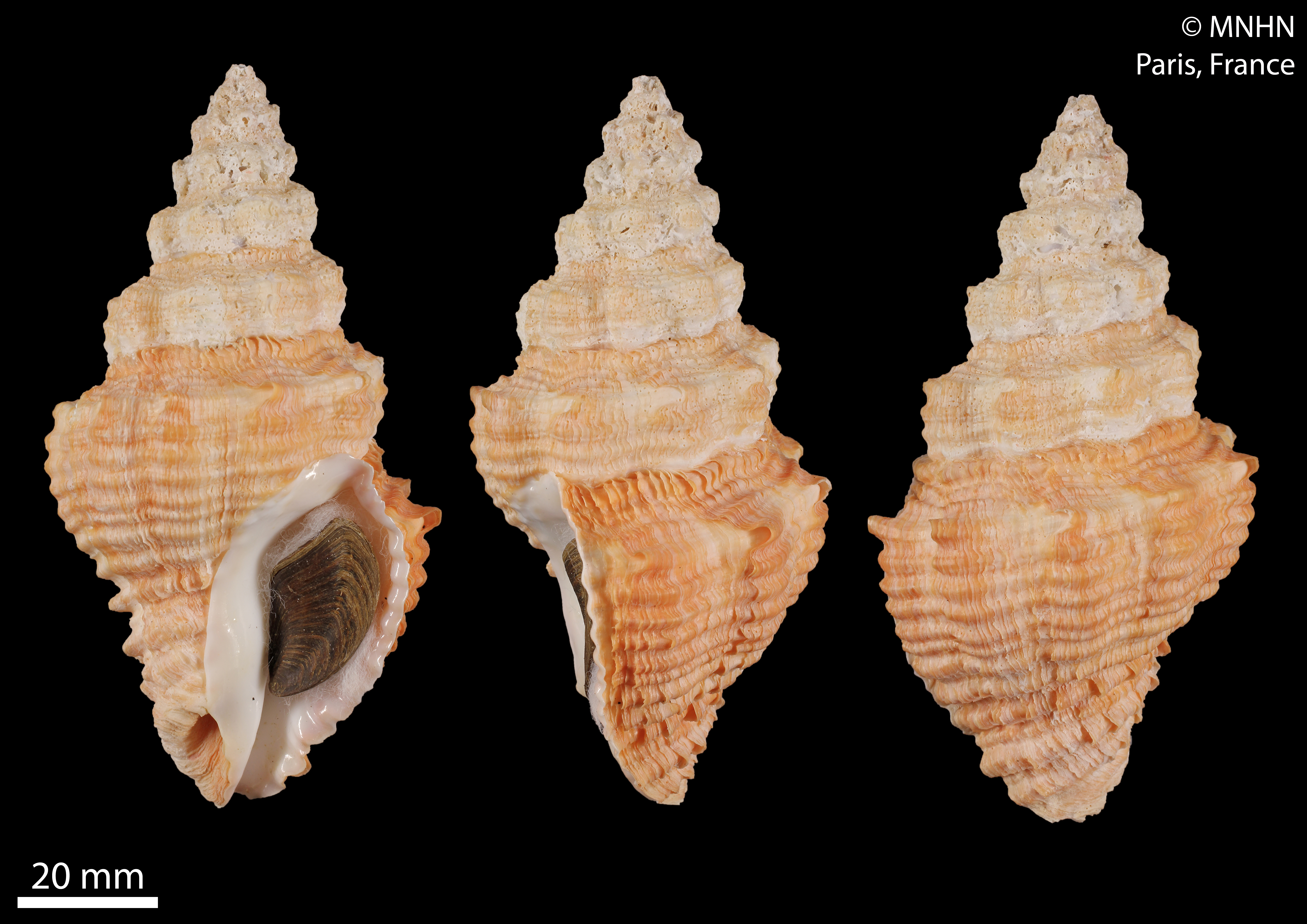
- Shell of Altivasum flindersi (specimen at MNHN, Paris)

Scientific classification
- Kingdom: Animalia
- Phylum: Mollusca
- Class: Gastropoda
- Subclass: Caenogastropoda
- Order: Neogastropoda
- Superfamily: Turbinelloidea
- Family: Vasidae
- Genus: Altivasum; Hedley, 1914

Type species
- Latirus aurantiacus Verco, 1895

Species
- See text

Synonyms
- Vasum (Altivasum) Hedley, 1914

= Altivasum =

Genus of gastropods

Altivasum is a genus of sea snails, marine gastropod mollusks in the family Vasidae.

== Description ==
(Original description) This newly identified genus is characterized by its elevated spire, hollow axis, and three distinct plaits on the lower columella.

== Species ==
Species within the genus Altivasum include:

- Altivasum clarksoni S. J. Maxwell & Dekkers, 2019
- Altivasum flindersi Verco, 1914
- Altivasum hedleyi S. J. Maxwell & Dekkers, 2019
- Altivasum pauladellaboscae M. Cooper & S. J. Maxwell, 2020
- Altivasum profundum Dekkers & S. J. Maxwell, 2018

Species brought into synonymy

- Altivasum typicum Hedley, 1916: synonym of Altivasum flindersi Verco, 1914
