= Florivasum stephanti =

Scientific classification
- Kingdom: Animalia
- Phylum: Mollusca
- Class: Gastropoda
- Subclass: Caenogastropoda
- Order: Neogastropoda
- Superfamily: Turbinelloidea
- Family: Vasidae
- Genus: Florivasum
- Species: F. stephanti

Binomial name
- Florivasum stephanti (W. K. Emerson & Sage, 1988)

Synonyms
- Vasum stephanti W. K. Emerson & Sage, 1988 superseded combination

Species of gastropod

Florivasum stephanti, common name the rhinoceros vase snail or rhinoceros vase shell, is a species of large predatory sea snail, a marine gastropod mollusk within the family Vasidae.

== Description ==
The length of the shell attains 58 mm.

== Distribution ==
This marine species occurs off Somalia.
