= Globivasum elongatum =

Scientific classification
- Kingdom: Animalia
- Phylum: Mollusca
- Class: Gastropoda
- Subclass: Caenogastropoda
- Order: Neogastropoda
- Superfamily: Turbinelloidea
- Family: Vasidae
- Genus: Globivasum
- Species: †G. elongatum

Binomial name
- †Globivasum elongatum (E. H. Vokes. 1970)

Synonyms
- † Vasum elongatum E. H. Vokes, 1970 superseded combination

Species of gastropod

Globivasum elongatum is an extinct species of medium to large sea snail, a marine gastropod mollusk in the family Vasidae.

== Description ==
Measurements of the shell: 42.0 x 21.5 mm.

== Distribution ==
Fossils of this marine species have been found in Miocene strata of the Florida, USA. (age range: 20.43 to 15.97 Ma).
