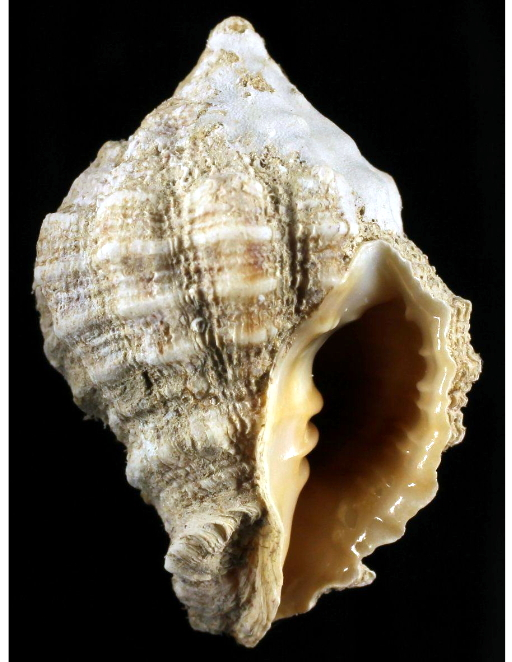
- Shell of Globivasum globulus (specimen at MNHN, Paris)

Scientific classification
- Kingdom: Animalia
- Phylum: Mollusca
- Class: Gastropoda
- Subclass: Caenogastropoda
- Order: Neogastropoda
- Superfamily: Turbinelloidea
- Family: Vasidae
- Genus: Globivasum
- Species: G. globulus

Binomial name
- Globivasum globulus (Lamarck, 1816)

Synonyms
- Buccinella tuberculata Perry, 1811 (invalid: declared a nomen oblitum by Petit (2003) under ICZN Article 23.9.2, with the junior synonym Vasum globulus becoming a nomen protectum); Turbinella globulus Lamarck, 1816 (basionym); Turbinella nuttingi Henderson, 1919; Vasum (Globivasum) globulus (Lamarck, 1816) alternative representation; Vasum (Globivasum) globulus nuttingi (J. B. Henderson, 1919) junior subjective synonym; Vasum (Globivasum) nuttingi (J. B. Henderson, 1919) junior subjective synonym; Vasum antiguaensis Usticke, 1971; Vasum globulus (Lamarck, 1816) superseded combination; Vasum globulus antiguense Nowell-Usticke, 1969; Vasum globulus nuttingi (J. B. Henderson, 1919) junior subjective synonym; Voluta globosa Dillwyn, 1817

= Globivasum globulus =

Species of gastropod

Globivasum globulus is a rare species of medium-sized predatory sea snail, a marine gastropod mollusk in the family Vasidae, the vase snails.

Subspecies:

- Globivasum globulus whicheri Petuch, 2013: synonym of Globivasum whicheri Petuch, 2013 (superseded rank)

== Description ==
The shell of the species is almost spherical, which is unusual in vase snails, hence the specific name globulus. The maximum recorded size of the shell is 43 mm, but it is small compared to that of other species in the same genus.

== Distribution ==
This species appears to be endemic to a few small islands in the Leeward Island chain of the Lesser Antilles, West Indies. It has been recorded from the following islands:

- Barbuda
- Antigua
- Sint Eustatius
