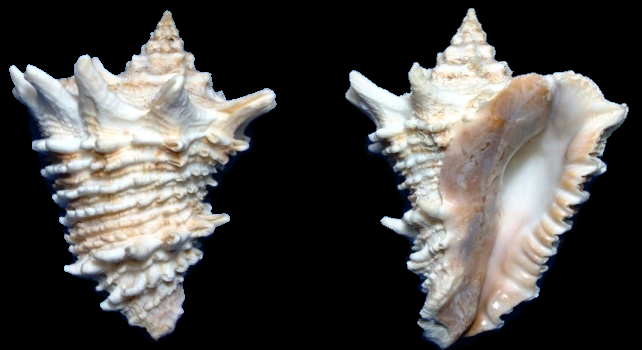
- Two views of a shell of the helmet vase, Aristovasum cassiforme.

Scientific classification
- Kingdom: Animalia
- Phylum: Mollusca
- Class: Gastropoda
- Subclass: Caenogastropoda
- Order: Neogastropoda
- Superfamily: Turbinelloidea
- Family: Vasidae
- Genus: Aristovasum
- Species: A. cassiforme

Binomial name
- Aristovasum cassiforme (Kiener, 1840)

Synonyms
- Turbinella cassiformis Kiener, 1840; Vasum cassidiforme Kiener, 1845

= Aristovasum cassiforme =

Species of gastropod

Aristovasum cassiforme, common name the helmet vase, is a species of medium to large sea snail, a marine gastropod mollusk in the family Vasidae.

== Distribution ==
Aristovasum cassiforme lives in the southeastern and northeastern littoral of Brazil, including Abrolhos and the Brazilian states of Rio Grande do Norte, Paraíba, Pernambuco, Alagoas, Sergipe, Bahia and Espírito Santo.

== Shell description ==
The maximum reported size of this species shell is 114.9 mm.

Aristovasum cassiforme has a large, thick and heavy shell, presenting 8 whorls. One of its most striking characteristics is its rich ornamentation, with foliated cords and spines over the body whorl and shoulder, respectively. It is colored cream or light brown externally, while the aperture may be colored purplish-brown.

== Distribution ==
This marine species occurs off Brazil.

== Ecology ==
=== Habitat ===
This sea snail lives on sand and muddy bottoms, to a depth of 70 m.
