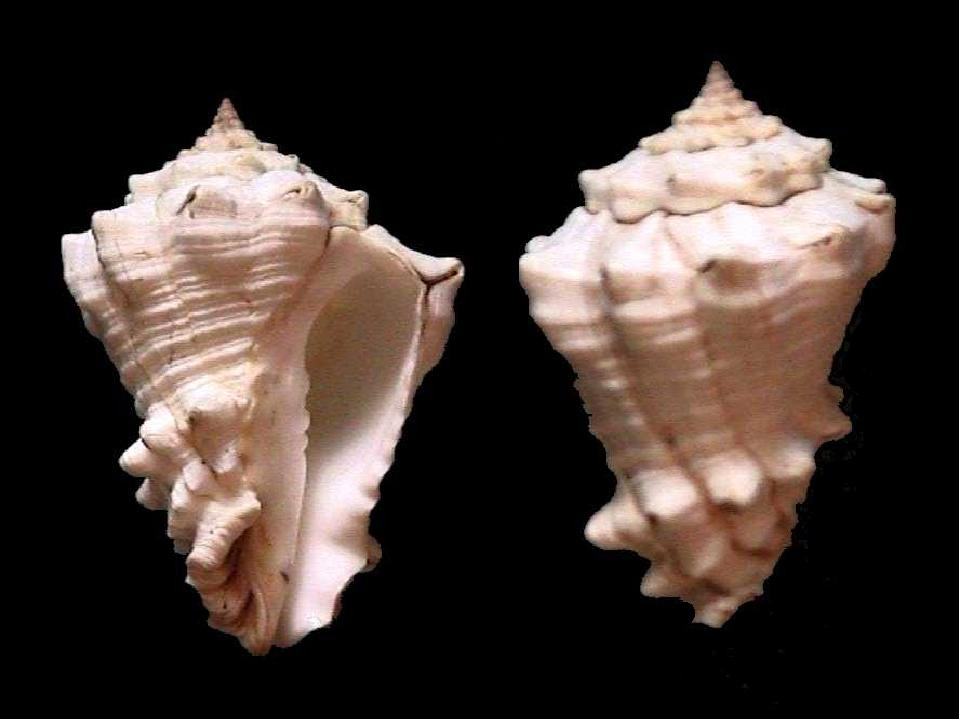
- Two views of a shell of Volutella muricata without periostracum from Los Roques archipelago, Venezuela

Scientific classification
- Kingdom: Animalia
- Phylum: Mollusca
- Class: Gastropoda
- Subclass: Caenogastropoda
- Order: Neogastropoda
- Superfamily: Turbinelloidea
- Family: Vasidae
- Genus: Volutella
- Species: V. muricata

Binomial name
- Volutella muricata (Born, 1778)

Synonyms
- Turbinella pugillaris Lamarck, 1822; Vasum muricatum (Born, 1778) superseded combination; Vasum urna Röding, 1798; Voluta muricata Born, 1778 (original combination); Volutella divergens Perry, 1810

= Volutella muricata =

Species of gastropod

Volutella muricata, common name the Caribbean vase, is a species of medium to large sea snail, a marine gastropod mollusk in the family Vasidae.

== Description ==
Volutella muricata has a large, thick and heavy shell that reaches a length of 50 – 100 mm. The shell is quite elongated, conical or vase-shaped (hence the common name). There are blunt spines at the shoulder and near the base. The shell is off- white with black or dark brown periostracum externally, while the aperture is usually white. The columella has 5 strong folds, the first and third being the largest.

== Distribution ==
This species is widespread in the Caribbean Sea. In Venezuela this species has been reported from the state of Falcon, Nueva Esparta and Dependencias Federales.

== Habitat ==
This species is rather common and is often found in pairs in shallow water. It preys on worms and clams.

== Gallery ==
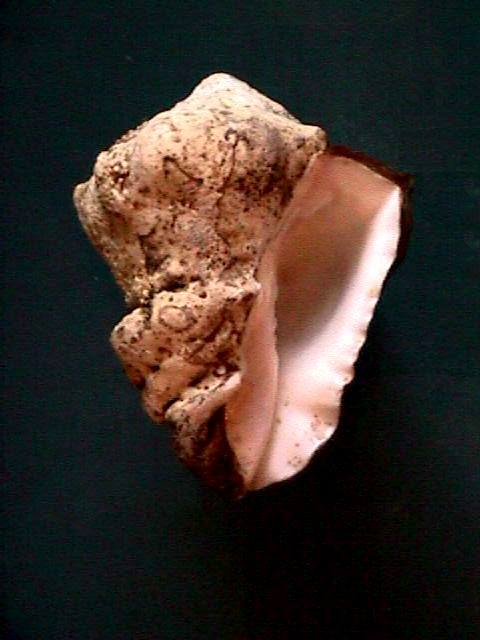
Volutella muricata from Los Monjes Archipelago, Venezuela.

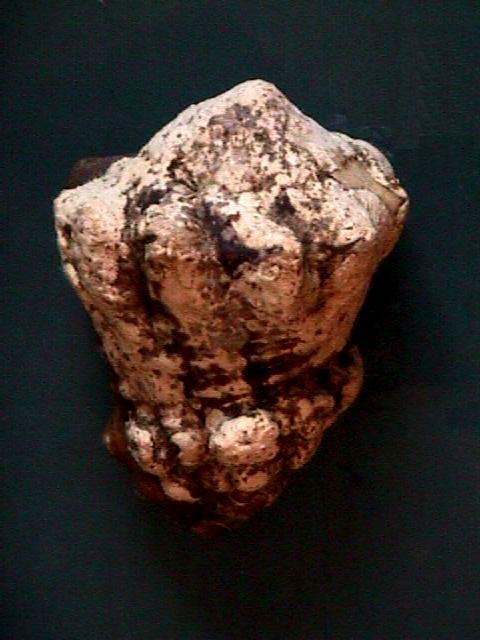
Volutella muricata from Los Monjes Archipelago, Venezuela.

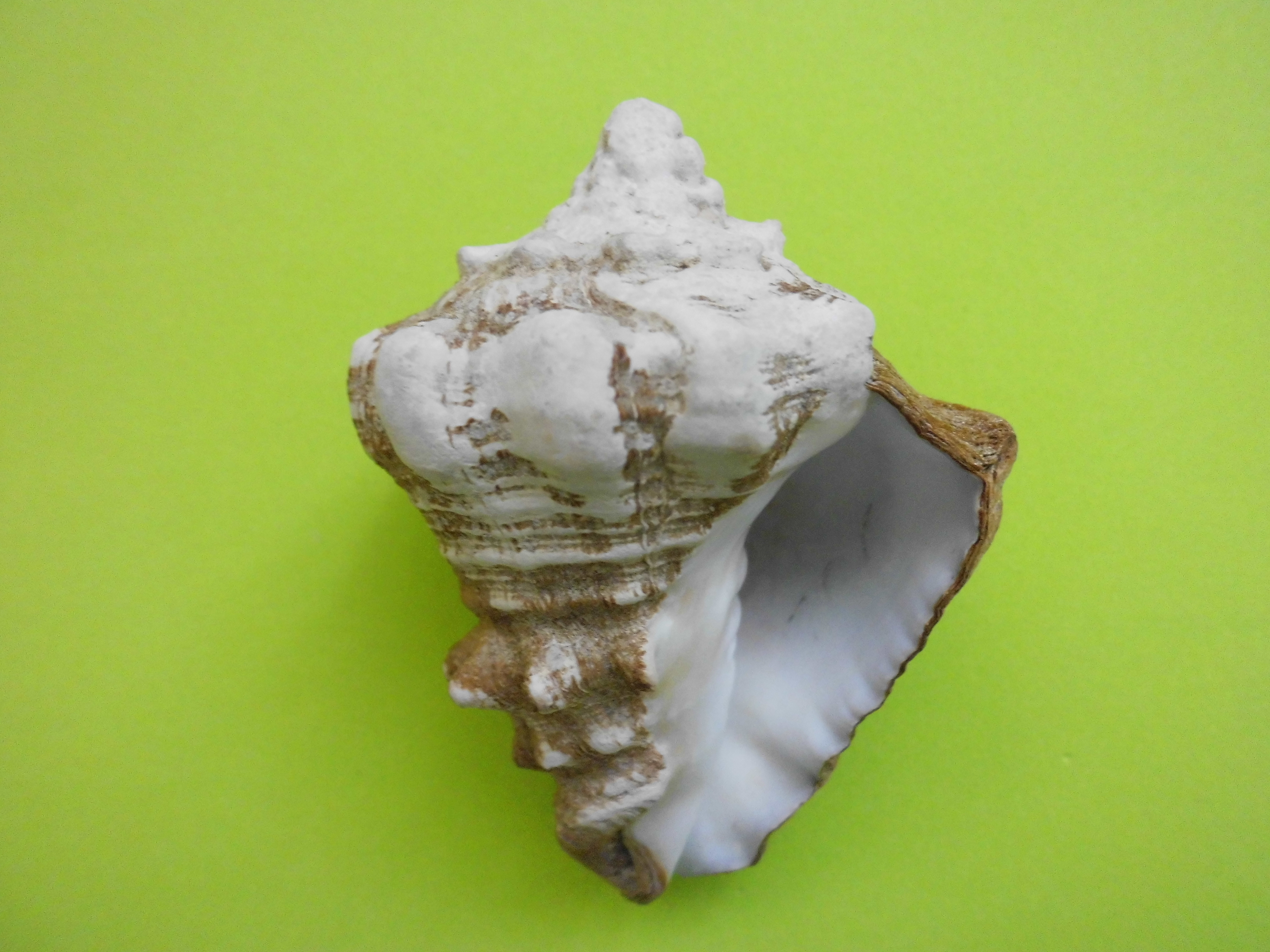
Volutella muricata from Isla La Tortuga

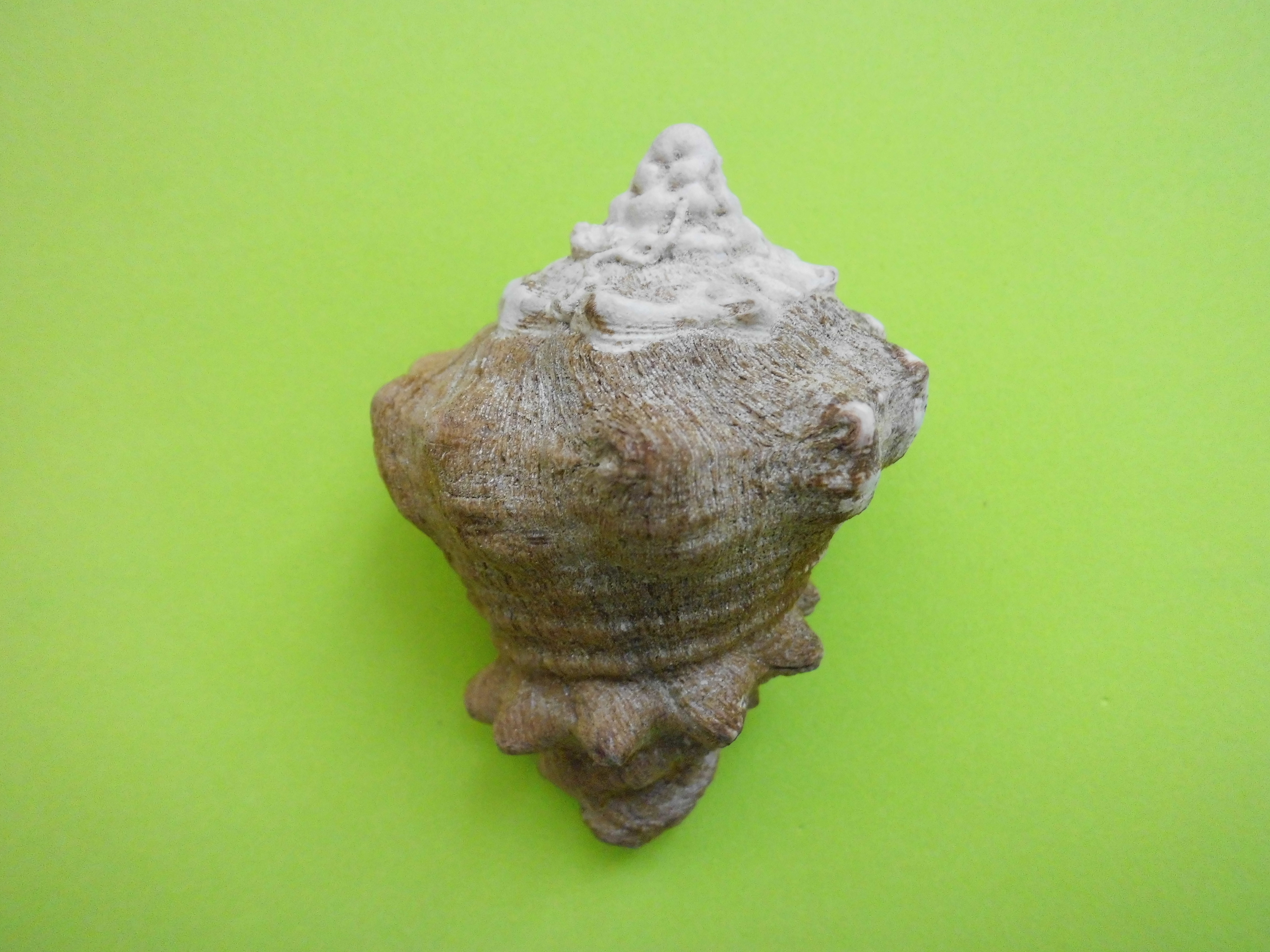
Volutella muricata from Isla La Tortuga
