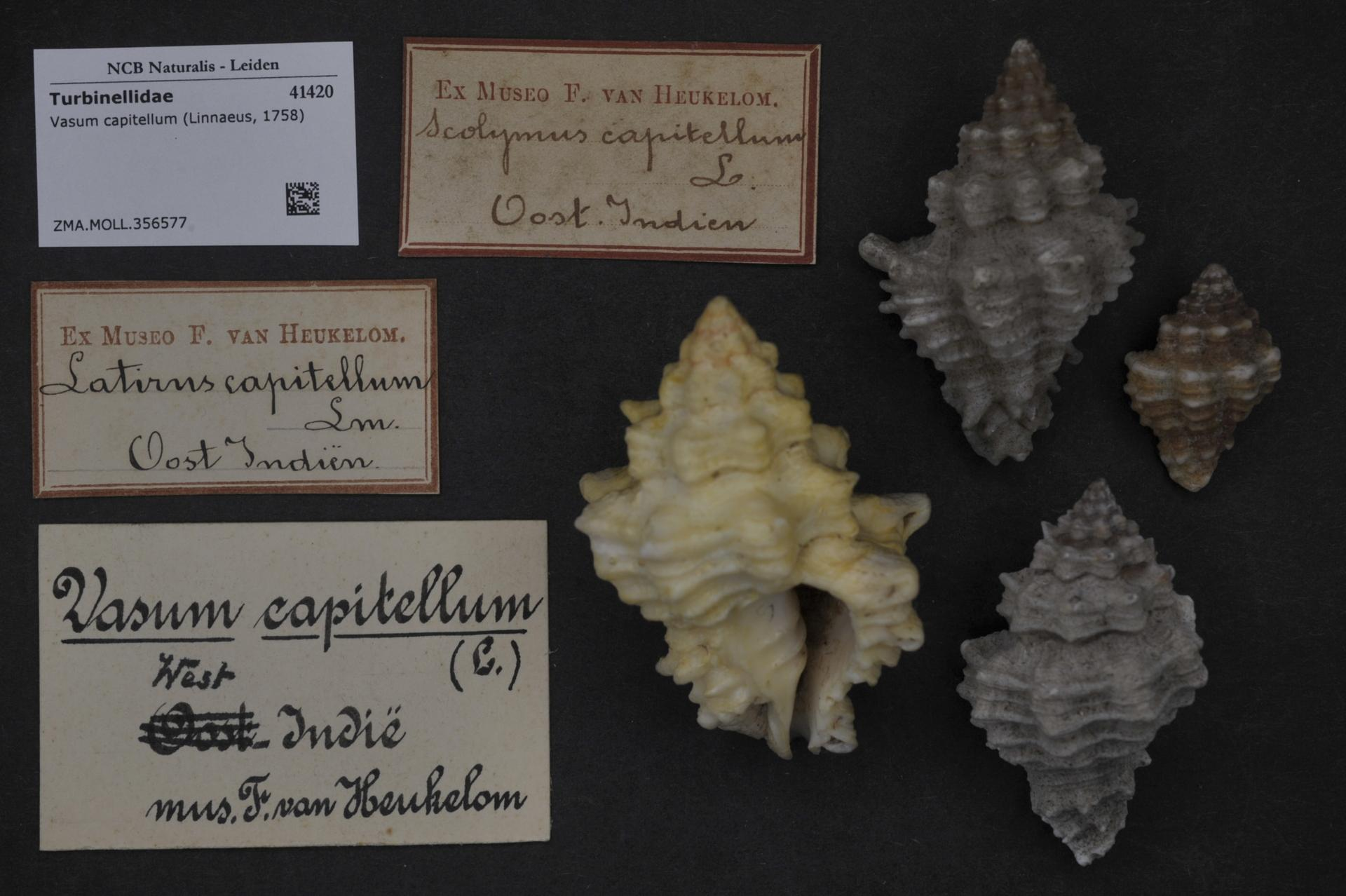
- Shell of Globivasum capitellum (specimen at Naturalis Biodiversity Center)

Scientific classification
- Kingdom: Animalia
- Phylum: Mollusca
- Class: Gastropoda
- Subclass: Caenogastropoda
- Order: Neogastropoda
- Superfamily: Turbinelloidea
- Family: Vasidae
- Genus: Globivasum
- Species: G. capitellum

Binomial name
- Globivasum capitellum (Linnaeus, 1758)

Synonyms
- Murex capitellum Linnaeus, 1758 (original combination); Turbinella bilamillata Risso, 1826 junior subjective synonym; Turbinella mitis Lamarck, 1822; Vasum capitellum (Linnaeus, 1758) · unaccepted > superseded combination; Volutella rubescens Perry, 1811

= Globivasum capitellum =

Species of gastropod

Globivasum capitellum, common name the helmet vase, is a species of medium to large sea snail, a marine gastropod mollusk in the family Vasidae.

== Shell description ==
The length of the shell varies between 33 mm and 79.6 mm.

== Distribution ==
This marine species occurs in the Caribbean Sea.

Fossils have been found in Quaternary strata of the Dominican Republic (age range: 2.588 to 0.012 Ma).
