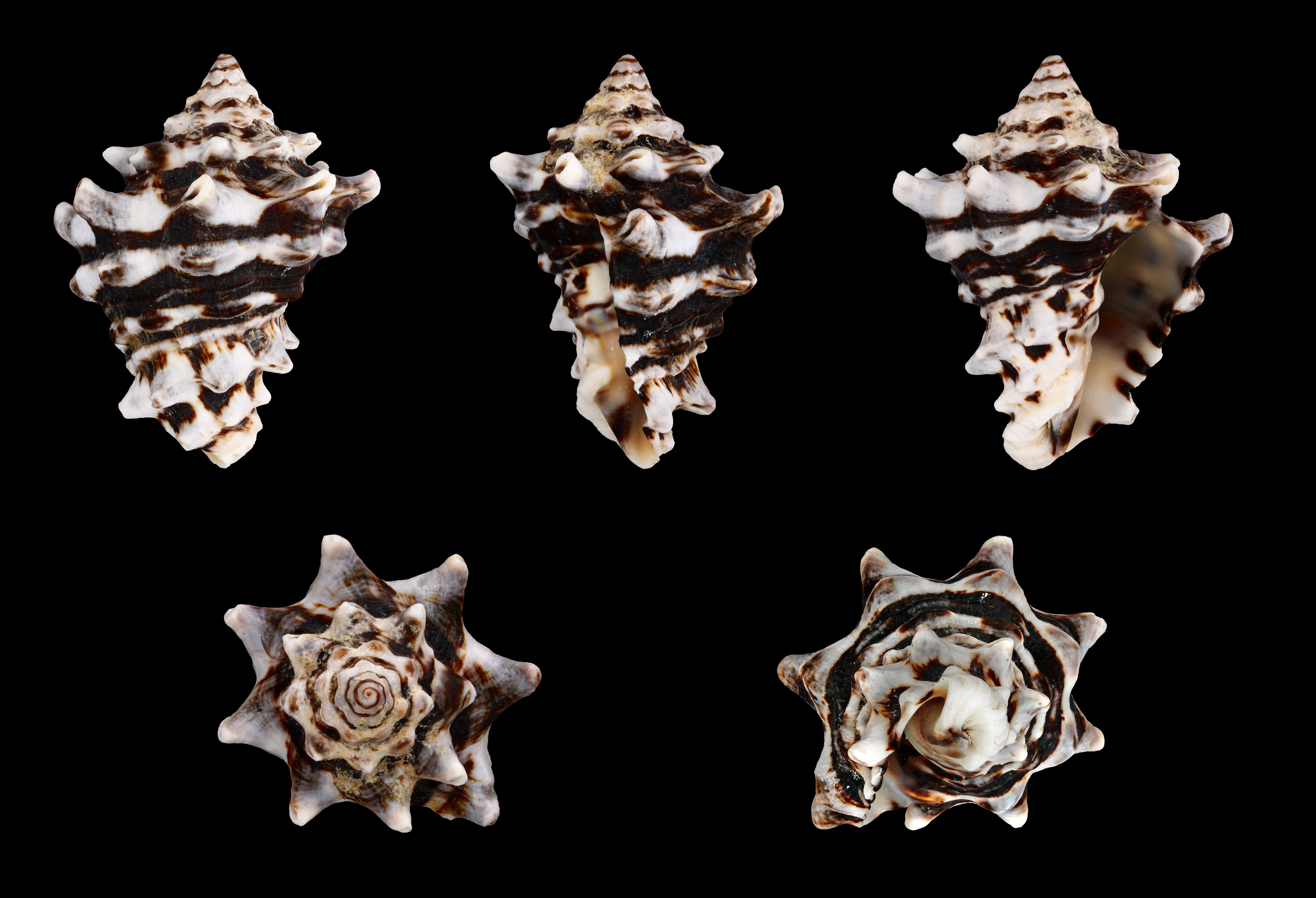

Scientific classification
- Kingdom: Animalia
- Phylum: Mollusca
- Class: Gastropoda
- Subclass: Caenogastropoda
- Order: Neogastropoda
- Superfamily: Turbinelloidea
- Family: Vasidae
- Genus: Vasum
- Species: V. turbinellus

Binomial name
- Vasum turbinellus (Linnaeus, 1758)

Synonyms
- Murex turbinellus Linnaeus, 1758 (original combination); Turbinella cornigera Lamarck, 1822; Turbinella variolaris Lamarck, 1822; Vasum nigra G. Perry, 1811; Vasum turbinellum [sic] (misspelling); Vasum variolaris J.B.P.A. Lamarck, 1822; Volutella nigra Perry, 1811; Vasum nigricans G. Perry, 1811

= Vasum turbinellus =

Species of gastropod

Vasum turbinellus is a species of gastropods belonging to the family Vasidae.

== Description ==
The length of the shell varies between 36.7 mm and 86 mm.

The shell is yellowish white and chestnut-black, stained and obscurely banded. The aperture is yellowish white. The border of the outer lip is black-spotted.

== Distribution ==
The species is found in Western Africa, Indian Ocean, Malesia, the Philippines, Indonesia, New Caledonia, the South China Sea, Australia.

Fossils have been found in Quaternary strata of Saudi Arabia (age range: 0.126 to 0.012 Ma).
