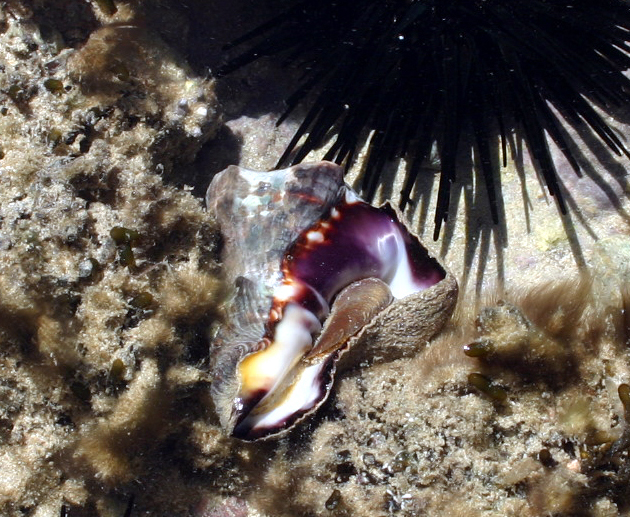
- A live but retracted individual of Vasum rhinoceras in a tide pool in Mombasa, Kenya, Africa

Scientific classification
- Kingdom: Animalia
- Phylum: Mollusca
- Class: Gastropoda
- Subclass: Caenogastropoda
- Order: Neogastropoda
- Superfamily: Turbinelloidea
- Family: Vasidae; H. Adams & A. Adams, 1853 (1840)

Type genus
- Vasum Röding, 1798

Synonyms
- Cynodontidae MacDonald, 1860; Vasinae H. Adams & A. Adams, 1853 (1840) superseded rank

= Vasidae =

Subfamily of gastropods

Vasidae, common name the vase snails or vase shells, are a taxonomic family of large predatory sea snails, marine gastropod mollusks within the superfamily Turbinelloidea.

Before 2024 it was considered as a subfamily of the Turbinellidae. Despite their historical inclusion in Turbinelloidea, they have been found by phylogenetic analysis to form a well-supported clade with Buccinoidea, while there is less support for a buccinoid clade to the exclusion of Vasidae, leading to the suggestion of including Vasidae in Buccinoidea.

== Shell description ==
The radula on the lingual membrane occur in three series, the central recurved, toothed at the tip, the lateral not versatile; the central tooth is broad, few-toothed; the lateral teeth are narrow, strong, with a single large denticle. The mantle is enclosed, with a straight siphon.

The operculum is ovate, acute, with the nucleus apical.

The shell is more or less turbinate, with plaits on the middle of the columella.

Shells of species in this subfamily are fairly large, very thick, and heavy. The shells have low spires and have plaits on the columella.

== Genera ==
Genera of the family Vasidae include:

- Afrivasum Y. Zheng, S. J. Maxwell & Dekkers, 2026
- Altivasum Hedley, 1914
- Aristovasum Vermeij, 2024
- Australivasum Y. Zheng, S. J. Maxwell & Dekkers, 2026
- Florivasum Vermeij, 2024
- Globivasum Abbott, 1950
- † Hystrivasum Olsson & Petit, 1964
- † Lupira Stephenson, 1941
- Rhinovasum Vermeij, 2024
- Siphovasum Rehder & Abbott, 1950
- Tudivasum Rosenberg & Petit, 1987
- Vasum Röding, 1798
- Volutella G. Perry, 1810

Else may include Enigmavasum Poppe & Tagaro, 2005, in later schemes as (Superfamily) Neogastropoda incertae sedis

Else for † Fyfea Finlay & Marwick, 1937, see Turbinellidae

Synonyms

- Cynodonta Schumacher, 1817: synonym of Vasum Röding, 1798
- Globivasum Abbott, 1950: synonym of Vasum Röding, 1798
- Scolymus Swainson, 1835: synonym of Vasum Röding, 1798
- Tudicula H. Adams & A. Adams, 1864: synonym of Tudivasum Rosenberg & Petit, 1987 (junior homonym of Tudicula Ryckholt, 1862)

(See also Volutella Perry, 1810: elsewhere a synonym of Vasum Röding, 1798)
