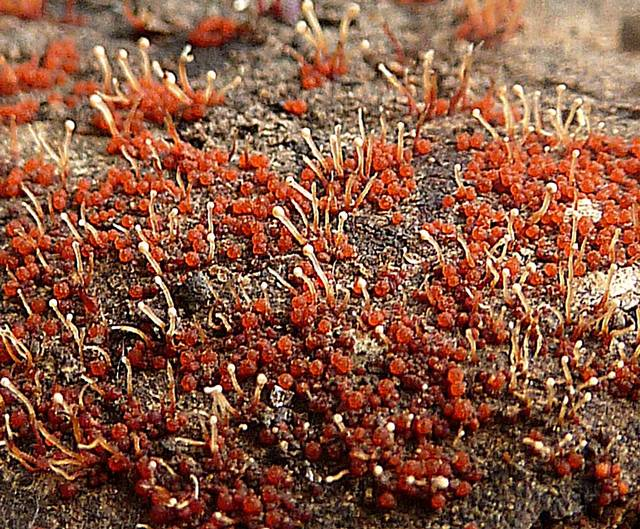
- Cosmospora stilbellae

Scientific classification
- Kingdom: Fungi
- Division: Ascomycota
- Class: Sordariomycetes
- Order: Hypocreales
- Family: Nectriaceae
- Genus: Cosmospora; Rabenh. 1862

Type species
- Cosmospora coccinea Rabenh. 1862

Species
- See text

= Cosmospora =

Genus of fungi

Cosmospora is a genus of ascomycete fungi in the family Nectriaceae. The genus, as circumscribed by Rossman et al. (1998), included all the nectrioid species with small, reddish, non-ornamented sexual fruiting bodies that collapse laterally when dry. However, the genus was shown to be polyphyletic, and the majority of species were re-classified into revived or recently established genera that are monophyletic. Cosmospora sensu Rossman housed members of the following genera: Chaetopsina, Cylindrocladiella, Fusicolla, Macroconia, Mariannaea, Microcera, Pseudocosmospora, Stylonectria, and Volutella. Cosmospora was restricted to species having acremonium-like asexual morphs that grow on polypores and xylariaceous fungi by Gräfenhan in 2011. About 20 species are accepted in the genus (Gräfenhan et al. 2011; Herrera et al. 2015; Zeng and Zhuang et al. 2016; Luo et al. 2019; Lechat et al. 2021).

The name Cosmospora comes from Greek kosmos + spora, meaning ornamented spores.

== Species ==
Cosmospora

- Cosmospora coccinea
- Cosmospora arxii
- Cosmospora butyri
- Cosmospora cymosa
- Cosmospora khandalensis
- Cosmospora lavitskiae
- Cosmospora scruposae
- Cosmospora viliuscula
- Cosmospora viridescens

Chaetopsina

- Chaetopsina fulva
- Chaetopsina penicillata
- Chaetopsina polyblastia

Cylindrocladiella

- Cylindrocladiella microcylindrica

Dialonectria

- Dialonectria episphaeria

Fusicolla

- Fusicolla matuoi

Macroconia

- Macroconia leptosphaeriae
- Macroconia cupularis
- Macroconia gigas
- Macroconia papilionacearum

Mariannaea

- Mariannaea catenulatae

Microcera

- Microcera coccophila
- Microcera diploa
- Microcera larvarum

Pseudocosmospora

- Pseudocosmospora joca
- Pseudocosmospora metepisphaeria
- Pseudocosmospora pseudepisphaeria
- Pseudocosmospora triqua
- Pseudocosmospora vilior

Stylonectria

- Stylonectria purtonii
- Stylonectria wegeliniana

Volutella

- Volutella consors
- Volutella citrinella

Incertae sedis

- Cosmospora biasolettiana
- Cosmospora chlorina
- Cosmospora damingshanica
- Cosmospora digitalicola
- Cosmospora diminuta
- Cosmospora dingleyae
- Cosmospora effusa
- Cosmospora geastroides
- Cosmospora glabra
- Cosmospora henanensis
- Cosmospora hispanica
- Cosmospora japonica
- Cosmospora jucundula
- Cosmospora kurdica
- Cosmospora lasiodiplodiae
- Cosmospora macrochaetopsinae
- Cosmospora marelliana
- Cosmospora meliopsicola
- Cosmospora nothepisphaeria
- Cosmospora nummulariae
- Cosmospora obscura
- Cosmospora peponum
- Cosmospora pseudoflavoviridis
- Cosmospora purpureocolla
- Cosmospora rickii
- Cosmospora rubrisetosa
- Cosmospora sansevieriae
- Cosmospora stegonsporii
- Cosmospora stilbosporae
- Cosmospora thujana
- Cosmospora tungurahuana
