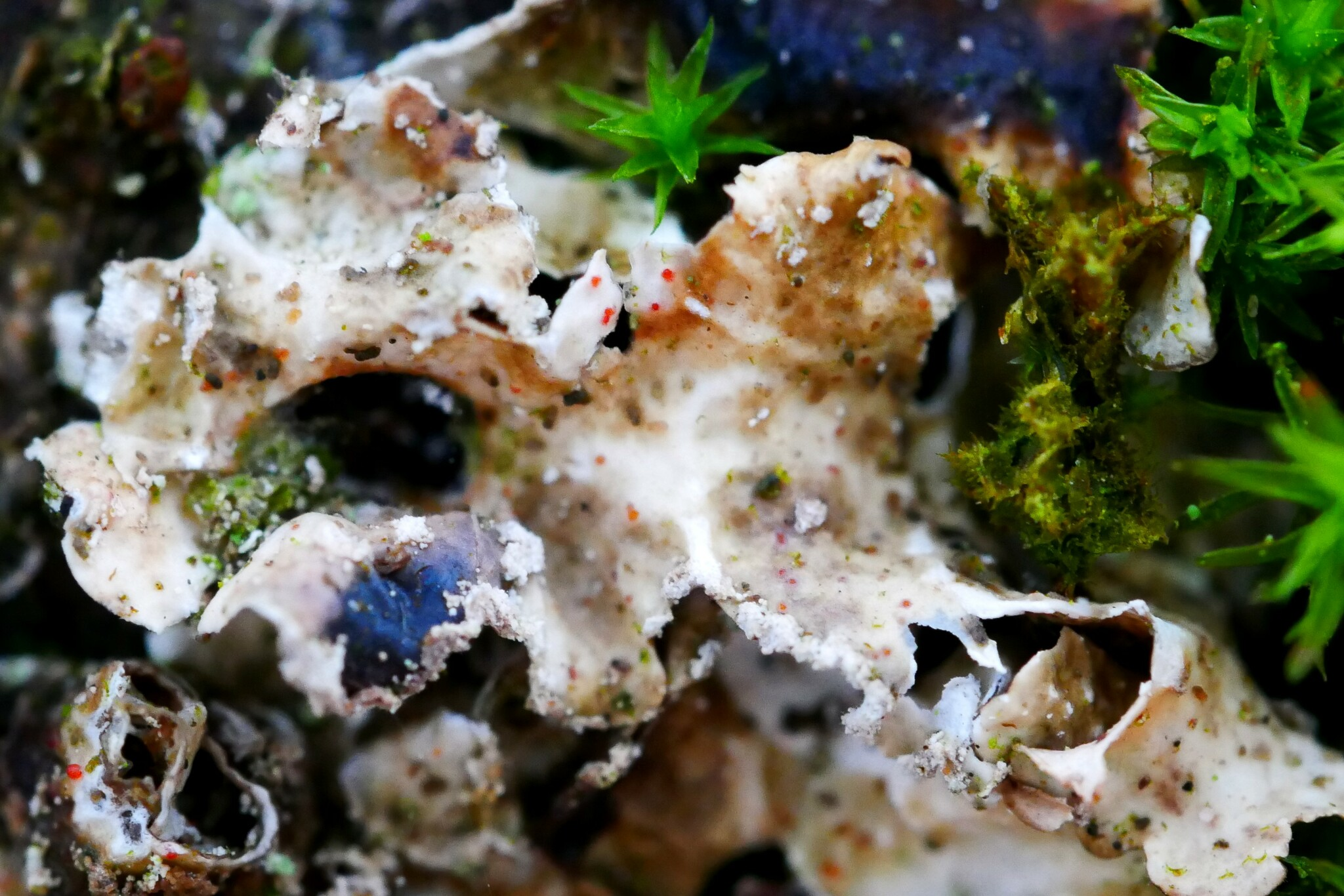

Scientific classification
- Domain: Eukaryota
- Kingdom: Fungi
- Division: Ascomycota
- Class: Sordariomycetes
- Order: Hypocreales
- Family: Nectriaceae
- Genus: Xenonectriella
- Species: X. subimperspicua

Binomial name
- Xenonectriella subimperspicua (Speg.) Etayo (2017)

Synonyms
- Nectria subimperspicua Speg. (1898); Nectriella subimperspicua (Speg.) R.Sant.(1984); Pronectria subimperspicua (Speg.) Lowen (1990); Xenonectriella subimperspicua var. degenerans Etayo (2017)

= Xenonectriella subimperspicua =

Species of lichen

Xenonectriella subimperspicua is a species of lichenicolous fungus in the family Nectriaceae. It has been recorded from South America, Europe, and New Zealand.

== Taxonomy ==
The fungus was first formally described by Carlo Luigi Spegazzini in 1898 as a member of genus Nectria. Spegazzini collected the type specimen from South America, where it was growing on Punctelia constantimontium. In 1984, Rolf Santesson proposed to transfer the taxon to genus Nectriella. Rosalind Lowen transferred it and several other lichenicolous species to Pronectria in 1990. Finally, Javier Etayo transferred the species to the genus Xenonectriella in 2017, giving it the binomial name by which it is currently known.

== Hosts ==
One of its hosts is the common foliose lichen species Punctelia borreri. Infection by X. subimperspicua creates discoloured or bleached areas on the thallus of the host; the perithecia of the fungus then become more readily visible. Two varieties of Xenonectriella subimperspicua have been defined: var. subimperspicua mostly parasitizes Parmelia and Punctelia but has also been recorded on Physcia, while var. degenerans parasitizes Parmotrema.
