= Volutella =

Volutella may refer to:

- Volutella (fungus), a genus of fungi in the family Nectriaceae
- Volutella (gastropod), a genus of gastropods in the family Vasidae
- Volutella, a genus of protists
