= List of cacao diseases =

Like other crops cocoa can be attacked by a number of pest species including fungal diseases, insects and rodents - some of which (e.g. frosty pod rot and cocoa pod borer) have increased dramatically in geographical range and are sometimes described as "invasive species".

== Bacterial diseases ==
Bacterial diseases
Crown gall	Agrobacterium tumefaciens (artificial inoculations)
Stripe	Pectobacterium carotovorum

== Fungal diseases ==
Fungal and Oomycete diseases
Anthracnose	Glomerella cingulata
Armillaria root rot	Armillaria mellea
Black pod disease	Phytophthora capsici Phytophthora citrophthora Phytophthora heveae Phytophthora megakarya Phytophthora palmivora
Black root	Rosellinia bunodes Rosellinia pepo
Brown root	Phellinus noxius
Canker	Phytophthora citrophthora Phytophthora palmivora Ceratocystis fimbriata
Ceratocystis wilt	Ceratocystis cacaofunesta Ceratocystis moniliformis Ceratocystis paradoxa
Collar crack	Armillariella mellea Armillariella tabescens
Collar rot	Ustulina deusta
Cushion gall (green-point gall)	Nectria rigidiuscula = Fusarium decemcellulare
Dieback	Physiological, stress induced, more than 80 fungal species associated with this syndrome
Frosty pod	Moniliophthora roreri
Horse hair blight	Crinipellis sarmentosa
Lasiodiplodia pod rot	Lasiodiplodia theobromae = Botryodiplodia theobromae
Leaf anthracnose	Colletotrichum spp.
Macrophoma pod rot	Macrophoma spp.
Frosty pod rot	Moniliophthora roreri
Phytophthora pod rot	Phytophthora capsici Phytophthora citrophthora Phytophthora hevae Phytophthora megakarya Phytophthora palmivora
Pink disease	Erythricium salmonicolor
Sudden death	Verticillium dahliae Mycoleptodiscus terrestris
Thread blight	Ceratobasidium koleroga
Trachysphaera pot rot (mealy pod)	Trachysphaera fructigena
Vascular streak dieback	Oncobasidium theobromae
Violet root rot	Nectria mauritiicola = Sphaerostilbe repens
Wet root rot	Ganoderma philippii
White root rot	Rigidoporus microporus = Rigidoporus lignosus
White thread	Marasmiellus scandens
Witch's broom	Moniliophthora perniciosa

== Miscellaneous diseases ==
Miscellaneous diseases
Algal disease	Cephaleuros virescens
Cherelle wilt	Physiological, no specific pathogen involved

== Insect pests ==
- Cocoa mirids or capsids worldwide (but especially Sahlbergella singularis and Distantiella theobroma in West Africa and Helopeltis spp. in Southeast Asia)
- Bathycoelia thalassina - West Africa
- Conopomorpha cramerella (cocoa pod borer – in Southeast Asia)
- Carmenta theobromae - C. & S. America

== Nematodes, parasitic ==
Nematodes, parasitic
Awl nematode	Dolichodorus spp.
Cyst nematode	Heterodera spp.
Dagger nematode	Xiphinema spp.
Lesion nematode	Pratylenchus spp.
Reniform nematode	Rotylenchulus spp.
Ring nematode	Hoplolaimus spp.
Root-knot nematode	Meloidogyne spp.
Spiral nematode	Helicotylenchus spp.
Stubby root nematode	Trichodorus spp.

== Parasitic plants ==
Mistletoes
Dendrophthora spp.
Loranthus spp.
Oryctanthus spp.
Phoradendron spp.
Phthirusa spp.
Tapinanthus spp.

== Viral and viroid diseases ==
Viral and viroid diseases
Cacao swollen shoot virus (CSSV)
Cacao yellow mosaic virus (CYMV)
Cocoa necrosis virus (CNV)
