= Peziotrichum =

Scientific classification
- Domain: Eukaryota
- Kingdom: Fungi
- Division: Ascomycota
- Class: Sordariomycetes
- Order: Hypocreales
- Family: Nectriaceae
- Genus: Peziotrichum

Species
- Peziotrichum corticola; Peziotrichum lachnella; Peziotrichum pulchellum; Peziotrichum saccardoanum

Genus of fungi

Peziotrichum is a genus of ascomycete fungus. It is an entomogenous fungus, meaning that it is found growing on the body of insects.
