= Cephalodiplosporium =

Scientific classification
- Kingdom: Fungi
- Division: Ascomycota
- Class: Sordariomycetes
- Order: Hypocreales
- Family: Nectriaceae
- Genus: Cephalodiplosporium; Kamyschko, 1961

Species
- Cephalodiplosporium elegans; Cephalodiplosporium terricola (type)

Genus of fungi

Cephalodiplosporium is a genus of fungi in the Nectriaceae.
