= Peziotrichum corticola =

Scientific classification
- Domain: Eukaryota
- Kingdom: Fungi
- Division: Ascomycota
- Class: Sordariomycetes
- Order: Hypocreales
- Family: Nectriaceae
- Genus: Peziotrichum
- Species: P. corticola

Binomial name
- Peziotrichum corticola Subramanian (Massee)

Species of fungus

Peziotrichum corticola is an ascomycete fungus that is a plant pathogen. It was first discovered in India by Massee. Rhinocladium corticola is a known synonym.

P. corticola causes black-band disease on the leaves and bark of mango trees. Black-band disease is little known, but highly infectious; it has caused significant damage to mango yield in India since 2009.
