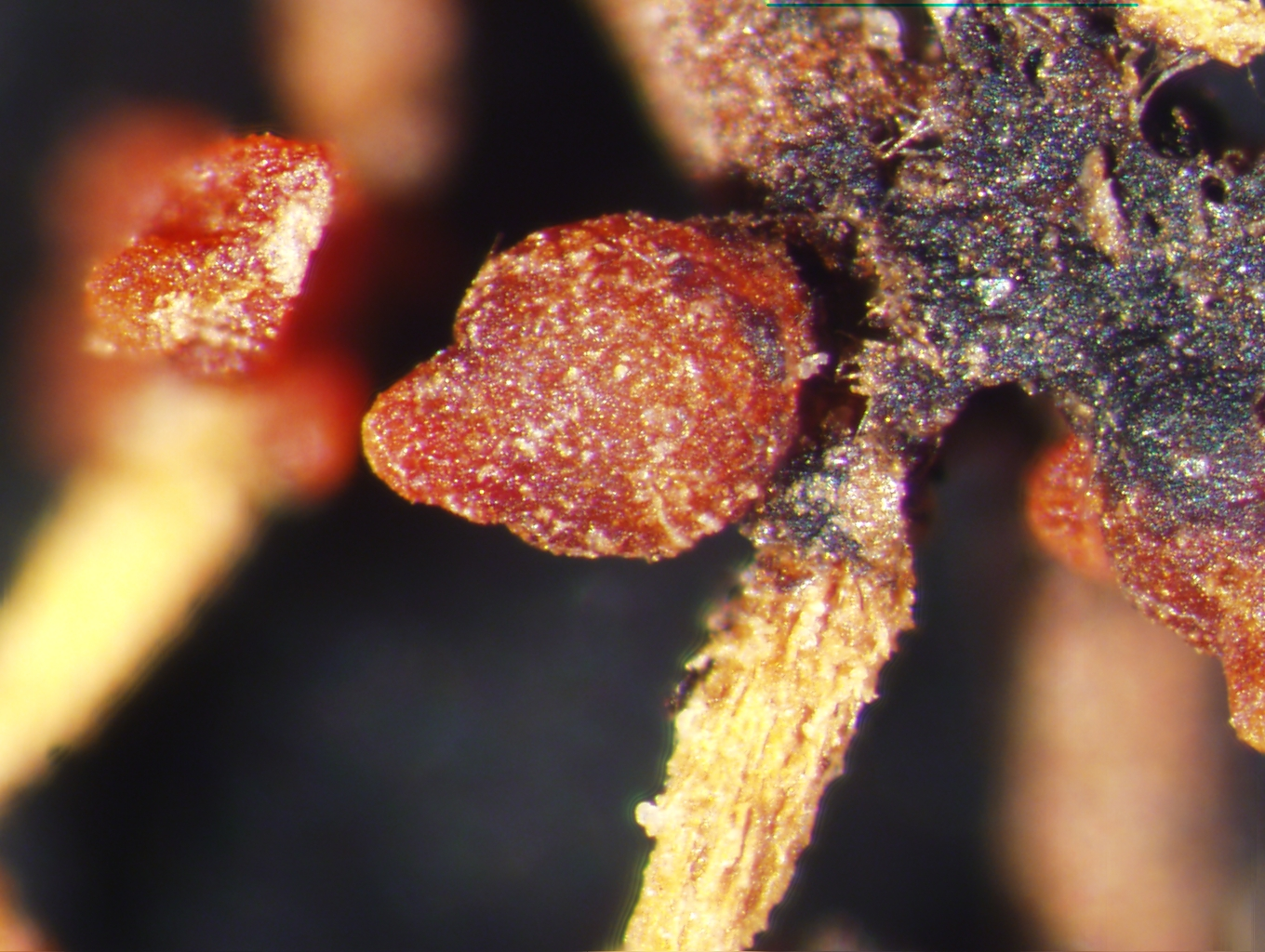
- Sexual fruiting body of Corallomycetella elegans

Scientific classification
- Domain: Eukaryota
- Kingdom: Fungi
- Division: Ascomycota
- Class: Sordariomycetes
- Order: Hypocreales
- Family: Nectriaceae
- Genus: Corallomycetella
- Species: C. elegans

Binomial name
- Corallomycetella elegans (Berk. and M.A. Curtis) C. Herrera & P. Chaverri (2013)

Synonyms
- Corallomyces elegans Berk. & M.A. Curtis (1853); Nectria mauritiicola (Henn.) Seifert & Samuels, (1985); Corallomyces mauritiicola Henn., (1904); Corallomycetella repens (Berk. & Broome) Rossman & Samuels, (1999); Sphaerostilbe repens

= Corallomycetella elegans =

Species of fungus

Violet root rot
- Common names: red root rot of citrus, pourriture des racines de l'hévéa (French)
- Causal agents: Corallomycetella elegans
- Hosts: rubber, cacao and tea trees
- EPPO Code: SPHSRE

Corallomycetella elegans is one of the two recognized species in the fungus genus Corallomycetella. It is a parasite of rubber, cacao and tea trees.

== See also ==
- List of cacao diseases
- List of tea diseases
