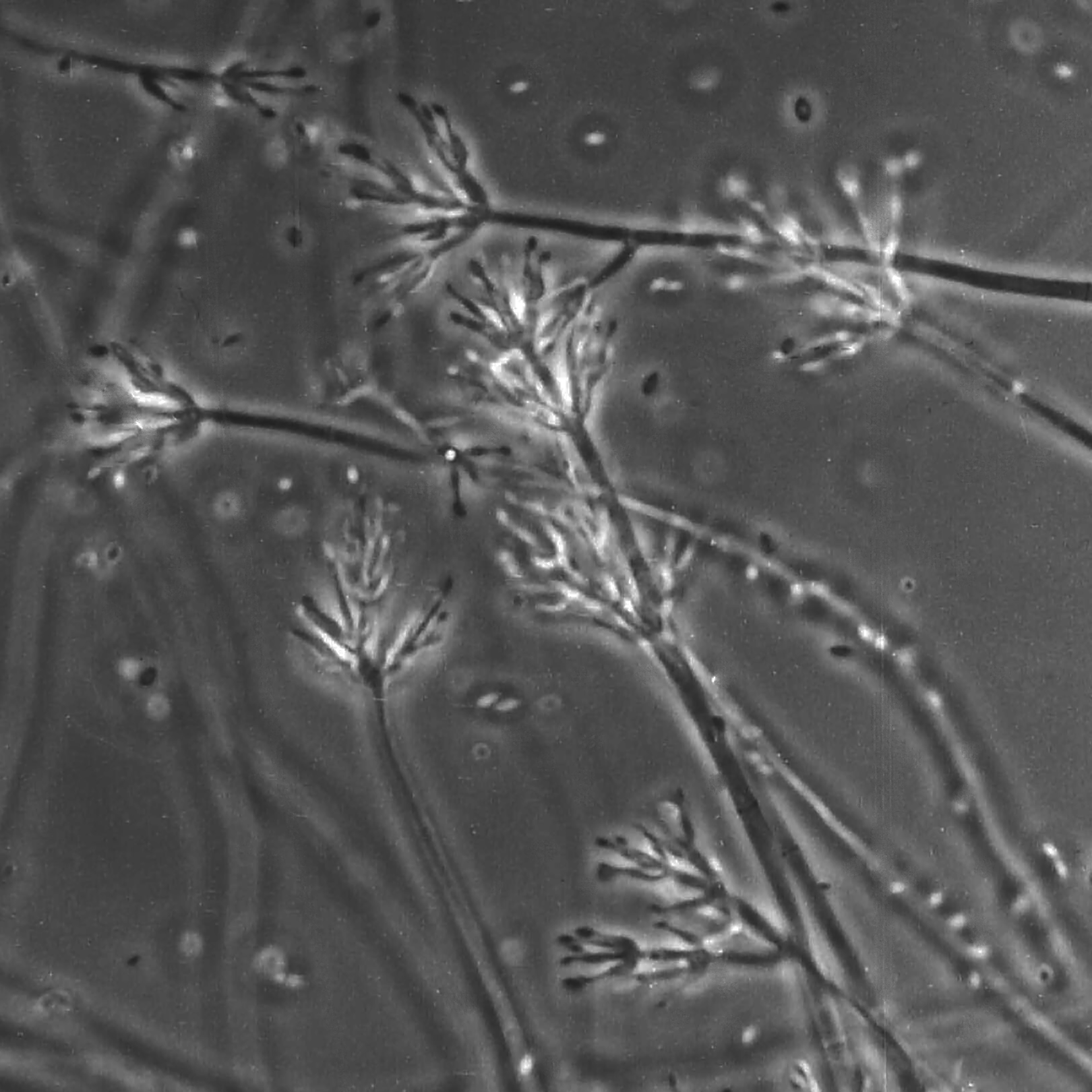

Scientific classification
- Kingdom: Fungi
- Division: Ascomycota
- Class: Sordariomycetes
- Order: Hypocreales
- Family: Nectriaceae
- Genus: Mariannaea
- Species: M. elegans

Binomial name
- Mariannaea elegans (Corda) Samson (1974)

Synonyms
- Penicillium elegans Corda (1838); Paecilomyces elegans Corda (1951); Penicillium elegant Corda (1838); Hormodendrum elegans (Corda) Bonord (1851); Spicaria elegans (Corda) (1871); Paecilomyces elegans (Corda) (1951); Spicaria elegans var. sorghina Sacc.(1886); Spicaria elegans var. microspora Jacz.(1922)

= Mariannaea elegans =

Species of fungus

Mariannaea elegans an anamorphic fungus (i.e., it reproduces exclusively asexually). It is mainly found on rotting wood and soil. M. elegans is not pathogenic to humans, animals, or plants.

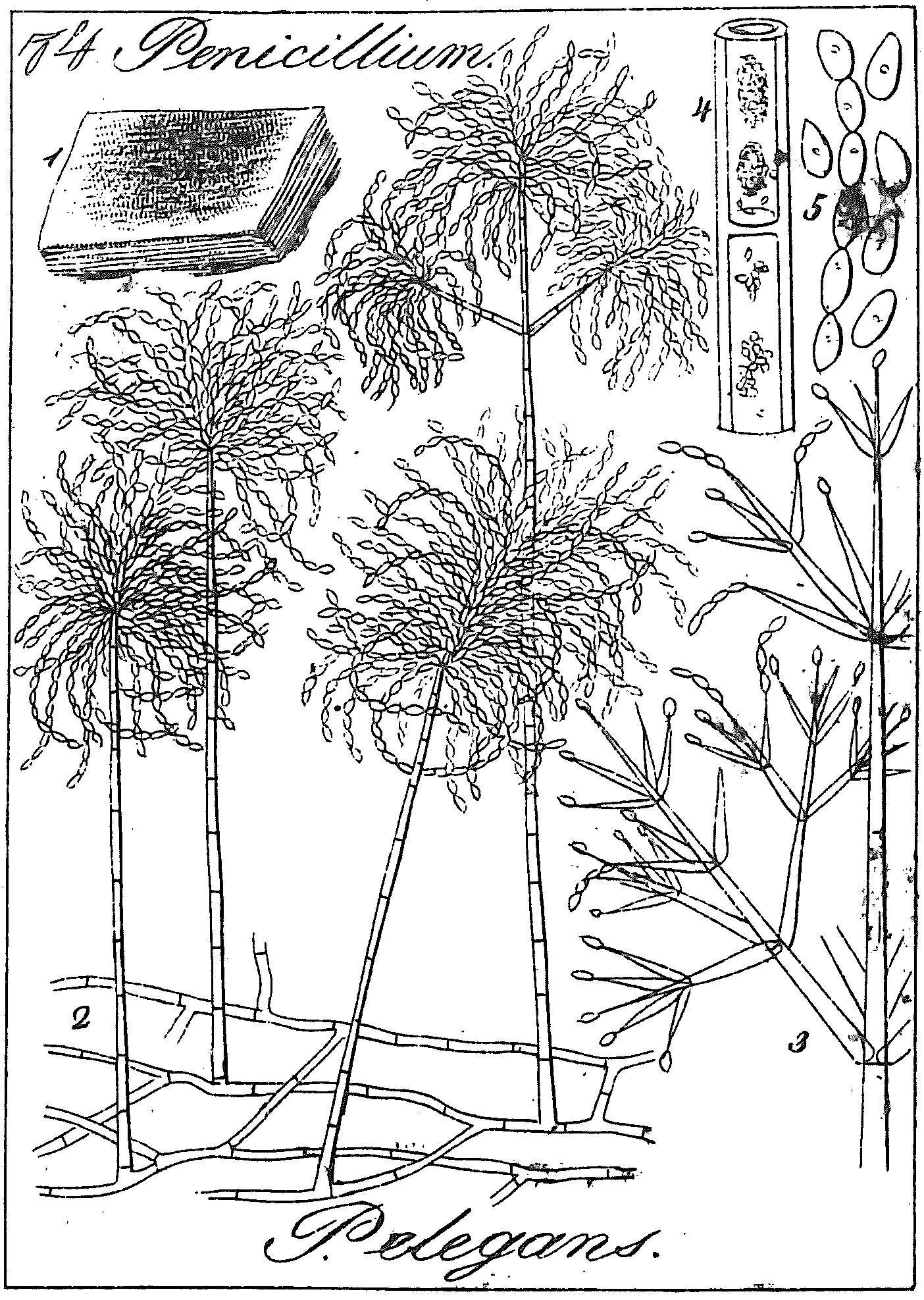
Original line illustration of Penicillium elegans (= Mariannaea elegans), source: ACJ Corda. 1838. Icones fungorum hucusque cognitorum. 2:1-43.

== History and taxonomy ==
Czech mycologist August Carl Joseph Corda named this species Penicillium elegans in 1838. This species was transferred to the genus Paecilomyces in 1951. Later, in 1952, French mycologist, Gabriel Arnaud named the species Mariannaea elegans although he failed to provide a Latin description, which was a requirement for valid publication at the time. Arnaud noted that the genus Mariannaea shared many characteristics with genus Paecilomyces but was distinguished by the divergent nature of the conidial chains of Mariannaea. This conclusion was supported by Dutch mycologist, Robert Archibald Samson, who in 1974 validated the names of the genus and species by providing Latin diagnoses. The genus Mariannaea currently consists of eight species. Two varieties of M. elegans exist: M. elegans var. elegans and M. elegans var. punicea.

== Growth and morphology ==
Mariannaea elegans is an anamorphic fungus (i.e., it reproduces asexually). When M. elegans is grown on a Petri dish in 2% MEA (Malt Extract Agar; medium used in a Petri dish) and PDA (potato-dextrose agar) at 22 °C (72 °F) the growth and morphological characteristics listed below are observed. The colonies of M. elegans grows better in MEA than in PDA. On average colonies of M. elegans can be observed with the naked eye having a diameter of 2.5–6 cm after 10 days of growth. They appear thin and velvety (i.e. smooth) or floccose (i.e. woolly) or matted (i.e. powdery) and are odourless. Sometimes the colonies make a ring shaped pattern as might be seen on a jawbreaker candy. Specimens isolated from wood possess brown colonies whose brown pigment fuses into the surrounding agar. However, specimens isolated from soil possess reddish-purple colonies whose pigmentation does not diffuse in to the agar surrounding the colonies of M. elegans. Colonies are white to cinnamon buff (peanut butter colour) and possess either smooth or rough walls. The mycelium is either smooth-walled or rough-walled, white to olivaceous (the green colour of the mould on blue cheese) or pink.

Conidiophores are arise from mycelia immersed in the agar. They are light brown, with a smooth or verrucose (i.e., bumpy) surface and grow to a maximum of 1000 μm long and reach a maximum of 10 μm in width at the base. Conidiophores can also arise from aerial hyphae. These conidiophores grow to 250 μm in length and 7 μm in width. Additionally, they can grow to reach a maximum of 1400 μm in length and 23 μm in width at their base. The tops narrow to 3-4 μm. Alternatively, conidiophores can grow laterally from ascending mycelium (i.e., the mycelium is not immersed in the agar) or hyphal ropes. On average these conidiophores are smaller than the ones that grow from hypha immersed in agar. They are smooth-walled or rough-walled, hyaline to pale yellowish. Bearing up to 4 diverging branches that are 9-22 μm long and 3-5 μm wide. They may bear secondary branches. Phialides are observed at the apex of the conidiophores and their branches. They are hyaline in colour and possesses a smooth surface and ellipsoidal (i.e. shaped like a football) to fusiform (i.e. spindle) in shape. They are 8-22 x 2.2-3.5 μm in width and they gradually become thinner reaching 0.8-1.4 μm in width at their apex. Growing obliquely form the apex of a phialide are long chains of conidia (singular conidium). Like phialides, they have a smooth surface and are ellipsoidal to fusiform in shape. Their apex is sharply pointed and round at the base, on average 5.3 x 2.7 μm and reaches a maximum of 9.0 x 4.0 μm in width.

The two varieties of Mariannaea elegans, M. elegans var. elegans and M. elegans var. punicea, are highly morphologically similar. Colonies of M. elegans var. elegans grow more slowly than those of M. elegans var. punicea. Colonies of the former also tend to develop a brownish colour and ringed pattern whereas those of the latter tend to develop a reddish-purple pigmentation and lacking a ringed pattern. M. elegans var. elegans is most commonly isolated from rotting wood whereas M. elegans var. punicea is only known from soil. The genus Mariannaea is closely related to Clonastachys and Gliocladium. They differ from Mariannaea because their conidiophores are clustered tightly together. M. elegans is often misidentified as a member of the genus Paecilomyces because of its morphological similarity. However, the phialides of Mariannaea are flask shaped (thick at the base gradually narrow towards the apex, in cross-section like a canoe paddle) whereas those of Paecilomyces tend to be shorter and stouter (in cross-section like a tennis racquet).

== Physiology ==
This fungus is not known to be a pathogen of humans, animals, or plants. A study carried out in 2007 revealed anti-M. elegans cutaneous bacterial communities that live on the skin of amphibians. The presence of these bacteria inhibits the growth of M. elegans on amphibians. The species grows optimally at a pH of 7.0; however, it tolerates a pH range of 5.5-8.0. The sporulation phase of M. elegans is sensitive to pH. It sporulates best at a pH range of 6.0-6.5 and below a pH of 5.0 sporulation is reduced. The optimal temperature that it grows in is 30 °C (86 °F). However, trances of M. elegans can be founds thriving at 50 °C (122 °F). M. elegans produces amylase, beta-glucosidase, cellulase, and protease. It is able to degrade cellulose. When M. elegans is grown in vitro in the presence of different sugars (e.g., glucose, galactose, sucrose, mannose, fructose, and lactose) at 30 °C (86 °F) for 2 days in PDA distinct cell morphology is observed. Growth in 2% of glucose, galactose, or sucrose leads to the formation of many small fungal cells. Whereas the opposite is observed in 2% of mannose, fructose, or lactose, which lead to the formation of a few large fungal cells. Sugar appears to be an important factor in the growth of M.elegans because in the absence of sugar it experiences a delay in growth.

== Habitat and ecology ==
Mariannaea elegans grows on decaying coniferous bark or wood, forest soil, house dust, prairie and grassland soils, calcareous soil, running water that has little pollution, waste stabilization ponds, acid mine drainage stream, fields treated with digested sewage sludge, in arable soils, and on pine chips.

Mariannaea elegans has been isolated from various regions in Canada: Quebec, Ontario, Manitoba, Saskatchewan, and British Columbia. Both varieties have both been recorded in Germany, the Netherlands, the United States, and Canada. However, only M. elegans var. elegans has also been found in France, the British Isles, Italy, Poland, and South Africa, whereas, M. elegans var. punicea has exclusively been found in Democratic Republic of the Congo.

The ecological role of this species is not well known. It is involved in wood biodeterioration either through the formation of soft rot cavities or through cell wall erosion. It may also influence the growth of other fungi. For example, at 25 °C (77 °F) it inhibits mycelial growth in the mushroom, Pholiota microspora; but at12 °C (54 °F) it enhances mycelial growth of P. microspora. It is capable of preventing sapstain (a blue to greyish-black colour) formation on wood treated with M. elegans. This is important in the lumber industry because discoloured wood is less versatile and can not be used for some applications. M. elegans has potential implication in humans. A study carried out in 2001 concluded that mariannaeaprone, a fungal metabolite made by M. elegans induces the aggregation of human platelet cells. M. elegans may also be consumed by amoebae.
