= Cephalodiplosporium elegans =

Scientific classification
- Kingdom: Fungi
- Division: Ascomycota
- Class: Sordariomycetes
- Order: Hypocreales
- Family: Nectriaceae
- Genus: Cephalodiplosporium
- Species: C. elegans

Binomial name
- Cephalodiplosporium elegans Kamyschko, 1961

Species of fungus

Cephalodiplosporium elegans is a species of fungus in the Nectriaceae.
