= Gliocephalotrichum simplex =

Scientific classification
- Domain: Eukaryota
- Kingdom: Fungi
- Division: Ascomycota
- Class: Sordariomycetes
- Order: Hypocreales
- Family: Nectriaceae
- Genus: Gliocephalotrichum
- Species: G. simplex

Binomial name
- Gliocephalotrichum simplex (J.A.Mey.) B.J.Wiley & E.G.Simmons

Species of fungus

Gliocephalotrichum simplex is a species of fungus belonging to the family Nectriaceae.

Synonym:

- Cylindrocladium simplex J.A.Mey. (= basionym)
