= Xenocalonectria =

Scientific classification
- Kingdom: Fungi
- Division: Ascomycota
- Class: Sordariomycetes
- Order: Hypocreales
- Family: Nectriaceae
- Genus: Xenocalonectria; Crous & C.L. Schoch 2000
- Species: X. serpens

Binomial name
- Xenocalonectria serpens (Decock, Hennebert & Crous) Crous & C.L. Schoch 2000

Genus of fungi

Xenocalonectria is a genus of ascomycete fungi in the family Nectriaceae. It is a monotypic genus containing the sole species Xenocalonectria serpens.
