= Albonectria rigidiuscula =

Scientific classification
- Kingdom: Fungi
- Division: Ascomycota
- Class: Sordariomycetes
- Order: Hypocreales
- Family: Nectriaceae
- Genus: Albonectria
- Species: A. rigidiuscula

Binomial name
- Albonectria rigidiuscula (Berk. & Broome) Rossman & Samuels (1999)

Synonyms
- Calonectria eburnea Rehm (1888); Calonectria lichenigena Speg. (1889); Calonectria rigidiuscula (Berk. & Broome) Sacc., (1878); Calonectria sulcata Starbäck (1899); Calonectria tetraspora (Seaver) Sacc. & Trotter, (1913); Fusarium decemcellulare Brick (1908); Fusarium rigidiusculum W.C.Snyder & H.N.Hansen (1945); Fusarium spicariae-colorantis Sacc. & Trotter ex De Jonge [as 'spicaria-colorantis']; Nectria rigidiuscula Berk. & Broome (1873); Scoleconectria tetraspora Seaver (1910); Spicaria colorans De Jonge (1909)

Species of fungus

Albonectria rigidiuscula is a fungal plant pathogen. The anamorph of A. rigidiuscula the fungus Fusarium decemcellulare is associated with inflorescence wilt and vascular necrosis in fruit tree crops such as mango (Mangifera indica), longan (Dimocarpus longan) and rambutan (Nephelium lappaceum). F. decemcellulare causes a disease known as cushion gall in Theobroma cacao and other tropical trees.
