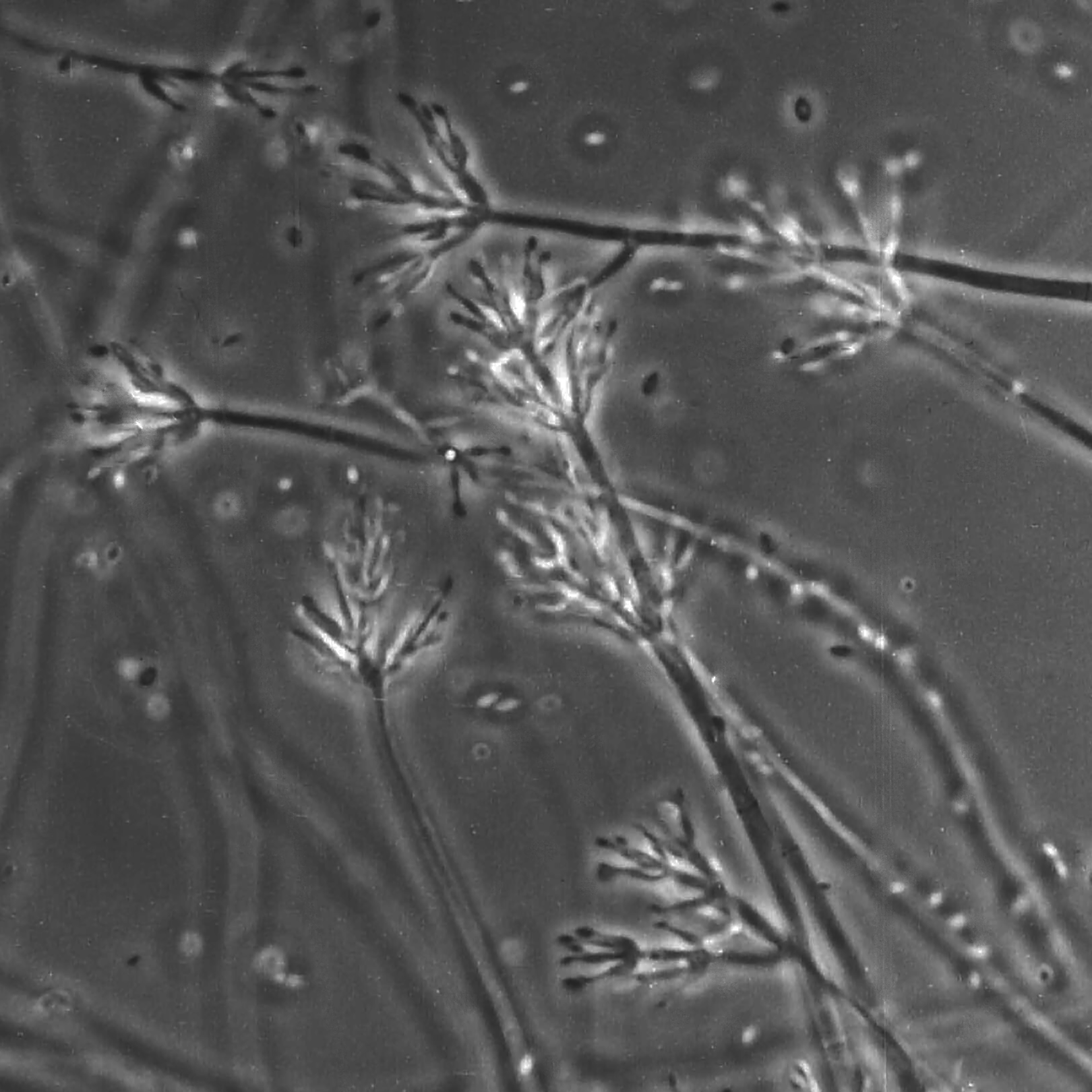
- Mariannaea elegans in phase contrast microscopy

Scientific classification
- Kingdom: Fungi
- Division: Ascomycota
- Class: Sordariomycetes
- Order: Hypocreales
- Family: Nectriaceae
- Genus: Mariannaea; G.Arnaud ex Samson

Type species
- Mariannaea elegans (Corda) Samson (1974)

= Mariannaea =

Genus of fungi

Mariannaea is a genus of fungi belonging to the family Nectriaceae.

The genus has cosmopolitan distribution.

The fungal genus was formally established by Samson (1974) to accommodate M. camptospora, M. elegans and the variety M. elegans var. punicea and was typified by M. elegans. The genus is characterized by branched, septate conidiophores with hyaline, flask-shaped phialides, 1–2-celled hyaline conidia mostly forming imbricate chains or slimy heads (Samson 1974; Samson and Bigg 1988; Samuels and Seifert 1991). The sexual morph of Mariannaea has been linked to genus Nectria (Samuels and Seifert 1991), and genus Cosmospora (Gräfenhan et al. 2011). However, Cosmospora and Nectria have been shown polyphyletic within the Nectriaceae family, while genus Mariannaea formed a monophyletic clade within Nectriaceae. Therefore, Gräfenhan et al. (2011) retained Mariannaea as a distinct genus in Nectriaceae. Five new species were further introduced in the genus (Crous et al. 2019; Hyde et al. 2020b; Boonmee et al. 2021; Watanabe and Hirose 2021; Yang et al. 2021). /

== Species ==
As accepted by Species Fungorum;

- Mariannaea aquaticola Kurniawati, L. Cai & K.D. Hyde (2010)
- Mariannaea atlantica A.L. Alves, A.C.S. Santos & P.V. Tiago (2020)
- Mariannaea camelliae Suwannar. & J. Kumla (2021)
- Mariannaea camptospora Samson (1974)
- Mariannaea chlamydospora D.M. Hu & L. Cai (2016)
- Mariannaea cinerea D.M. Hu & L. Cai (2016)
- Mariannaea clavispora Samson & Bigg (1988)
- Mariannaea dimorpha Z.Q. Zeng & W.Y. Zhuang (2014)
- Mariannaea elegans (Corda) Samson (1974)
- Mariannaea fusiformis D.M. Hu & L. Cai (2016)
- Mariannaea humicola L. Lombard & Crous (2015)
- Mariannaea imbricata D. Hirose & Kohei Watan. (2021)
- Mariannaea lignicola D.M. Hu & L. Cai (2016)
- Mariannaea macrochlamydospora Nonaka, Kaneta & Masuma (2015)
- Mariannaea nipponica Matsush. (1995)
- Mariannaea pinicola L. Lombard & Crous (2015)
- Mariannaea punicea (Samson) D.M. Hu & L. Cai (2016)
- Mariannaea samuelsii Seifert & Bissett (2011)
- Mariannaea submersa H. Yang & H. Zhang (2021)
- Mariannaea superimposita (Matsush.) Samuels (1989)
- Mariannaea terricola A.L. Alves, A.C.S. Santos, R.N. Barbosa, Souza-Motta & P.V. Tiago (2019)

Former species:

- M. catenulatae (Samuels) L. Lombard & Crous (2015) = Chaetopsina catenulata
- M. elegans var. punicea Samson (1974) = Mariannaea punicea
- M. pruinosa Z.Q. Liang (1991) = Cordyceps pruinosa, Cordycipitaceae
