= List of black walnut diseases =

This article is a list of diseases of black walnuts (Juglans nigra).

== Bacterial diseases ==
Bacterial diseases
Bacterial blight	Xanthomonas juglandis

== Fungal diseases ==
Fungal diseases
Anthracnose	Gnomonia leptostyla Marssonina juglandis [anamorph]
Cylindrocladium root rot	Cylindrocladium scoparium Calonectria kyotensis [teleomorph] Cylindrocladiella parva = Cylindrocladium parvum
Fusarium canker	Fusarium sporotrichioides Fusarium solani Fusarium lateritium Fusarium oxysporum
Leaf spot	Mycosphaerella juglandis Cylindrosporium juglandis [anamorph]
Nectria canker	Nectria galligena
Phytophthora root rot	Phytophthora citricola Phytophthora cinnamomi
Seedling shoot dieback	Phomopsis arnoldiae = Phomopsis elaeagni
Thousand cankers disease	Geosmithia fungus
Walnut bunch	Phytoplasma organism
White mold	Microstroma juglandis
White trunk rot	Phellinus igniarius
Wood decay	Schizophyllum commune Hypochnicium vellereum Trametes versicolor Phellinus gilvus Peniophora cinerea Hericium coralloides
Zonate leaf spot	Grovesinia pyramidalis

== Nematodes, parasitic ==
Nematodes, parasitic
Lesion nematodes	Pratylenchus musicola
Root-knot nematodes	Meloidogyne spp.
