= Xenonectriella nephromatis =

Scientific classification
- Domain: Eukaryota
- Kingdom: Fungi
- Division: Ascomycota
- Class: Sordariomycetes
- Order: Hypocreales
- Family: Nectriaceae
- Genus: Xenonectriella
- Species: X. nephromatis

Binomial name
- Xenonectriella nephromatis Pérez-Ort. (2020)

Species of fungus

Xenonectriella nephromatis is a little-known species of lichenicolous (lichen-dwelling) fungus in the family Nectriaceae. Found in Alaska, it was described as a species new to science in 2020 by Sergio Pérez-Ortega. The type specimen was discovered in the Hoonah–Angoon Census Area in Glacier Bay National Park and Preserve, where it was growing on a Nephroma lichen. The specific epithet alludes to this host lichen.

== Description ==
Xenonectriella nephromatis produces minute, flask-shaped fruiting bodies (ascomata) that develop inside the tissue of its lichen host. At first they are completely embedded, but as they mature they burst through the surface (erumpent) and appear as scattered, dark-red dots up to 0.6 mm wide. Each ascoma is nearly spherical to pear-shaped and lacks the external hairs sometimes seen in related fungi. Its wall is several cells thick: the outer layers consist of enlarged, brick-like cells that give the structure a reddish-orange hue, while the innermost layers are made of flattened, colorless cells. A simple spot test with potassium hydroxide (KOH) solution turns the wall a vivid violet-purple, a reaction that helps distinguish the species in the field. Around the tiny pore (ostiole) at the top, numerous slender filaments (periphyses) 15–25 μm long form a low cone that guides the spores outward.

Inside the spore chamber, the clear spore-bearing layer (hymenium) is packed with long, thin, eight-spored sacs (asci) that measure about 120–130 × 8–12 μm. The asci have a single flexible wall (unitunicate), broaden slightly at the tip, and open by a small slit rather than a lid. Their contents are arranged in a single file (uniseriate) and consist of broadly ellipsoid spores that vary somewhat in outline but are always divided by one cross-wall (1-septate). The ascospores are transparent, only faintly pinched at the septum, have rounded ends, and display a delicate surface pattern; they measure 12–16 × 5–8 μm. No sterile filaments between the asci (paraphyses) have been seen in mature material, and asexual reproductive structures are unknown for this species.
