= Nectria foliicola =

Scientific classification
- Kingdom: Fungi
- Division: Ascomycota
- Class: Sordariomycetes
- Order: Hypocreales
- Family: Nectriaceae
- Genus: Nectria
- Species: N. foliicola

Binomial name
- Nectria foliicola Berk. & M.A. Curtis (1868)

Species of fungus

Nectria foliicola is a fungal plant pathogen. It is distributed from Central America to northern South America, including Panama, Ecuador, Colombia, Mexico, and Venezuela.
