= Lanatonectria =

Scientific classification
- Kingdom: Fungi
- Division: Ascomycota
- Class: Sordariomycetes
- Order: Hypocreales
- Family: Nectriaceae
- Genus: Lanatonectria; Samuels & Rossman 1999

Species
- Lanatonectria flavolanata Lanatonectria flocculenta Lanatonectria mammiformis Lanatonectria oblongispora Lanatonectria raripila

Genus of fungi

Lanatonectria is a genus of fungi in the family Nectriaceae.
