= Cylindrocladiella elegans =

Scientific classification
- Domain: Eukaryota
- Kingdom: Fungi
- Division: Ascomycota
- Class: Sordariomycetes
- Order: Hypocreales
- Family: Nectriaceae
- Genus: Cylindrocladiella
- Species: C. elegans

Binomial name
- Cylindrocladiella elegans Crous & M.J. Wingf., 1993

Species of fungus

Cylindrocladiella elegans is an ascomycete fungus species in the genus Cylindrocladiella.
