= Viridispora =

Scientific classification
- Kingdom: Fungi
- Division: Ascomycota
- Class: Sordariomycetes
- Order: Hypocreales
- Family: Nectriaceae
- Genus: Viridispora; Samuels & Rossman 1999

Species
- Viridispora alata Viridispora diparietispora Viridispora fragariae Viridispora penicilliferi

Genus of fungi

Viridispora is a genus of fungi in the family Nectriaceae.
