= Leuconectria =

Scientific classification
- Kingdom: Fungi
- Division: Ascomycota
- Class: Sordariomycetes
- Order: Hypocreales
- Family: Nectriaceae
- Genus: Leuconectria; Rossman, Samuels & Lowen 1993

Species
- Leuconectria clusiae Leuconectria grandis

Genus of fungi

Leuconectria is a genus of fungi in the family Nectriaceae.
