= Pleogibberella =

Scientific classification
- Kingdom: Fungi
- Division: Ascomycota
- Class: Sordariomycetes
- Order: Hypocreales
- Family: Nectriaceae
- Genus: Pleogibberella; Sacc. ex Berl. & Voglino 1886

Species
- Pleogibberella calamia Pleogibberella leptospermi Pleogibberella schroeteriana

Genus of fungi

Pleogibberella is a genus of fungi in the family Nectriaceae.
