= Cyanonectria =

Scientific classification
- Domain: Eukaryota
- Kingdom: Fungi
- Division: Ascomycota
- Class: Sordariomycetes
- Order: Hypocreales
- Family: Nectriaceae
- Genus: Cyanonectria; Samuels & P.Chaverri

Genus of fungi

Cyanonectria is a genus of fungi belonging to the family Nectriaceae.

The species of this genus are found in Europe.

Species:

- Cyanonectria buxi (Fuckel) Schroers, Gräfenhan & Seifert
