= Volutella haitensis =

Scientific classification
- Kingdom: Animalia
- Phylum: Mollusca
- Class: Gastropoda
- Subclass: Caenogastropoda
- Order: Neogastropoda
- Superfamily: Turbinelloidea
- Family: Vasidae
- Genus: Volutella
- Species: †V. haitensis

Binomial name
- †Volutella haitensis (G.B. Sowerby I, 1850)

Synonyms
- †* Turbinella (Vasum) haitense G. B. Sowerby I, 1850 superseded combination: † Turbinellus haitensi G.B. Sowerby 1850; † Vasum (Vasum) haitense (G.B. Sowerby 1850); † Vasum engonatum Dall 1903; † Vasum haitense (G. B. Sowerby I, 1850) superseded combination; Vasum haitense engonatum Dall 1903

Species of gastropod

Volutella haitensis is an extinct species of medium to large sea snail, a marine gastropod mollusk in the family Vasidae.

== Description ==
The height of the shell: 60.0 mm, its diameter 37.0 mm.

(Original description in Latin) The shell is somewhat triangular and turbinated in form, transversely striated and covered with tubercles. The spire is rather depressed and slightly pointed. It consists of six whorls, which are angled at the posterior part and bear tubercles along the angle, with the sides sloping. On the anterior portion there are two rows of tubercles, of which the posterior row is much larger. The columellar lip is provided with four folds, and the siphonal canal is externally somewhat tuberculate.

== Distribution ==
Fossils of this marine species have been found in Pliocene strata of the Dominican Republic; also in Miocene strata of Brazil, Colombia, Mexico, Florida, USA and Venezuela (age range: 20.43 to 2.588 Ma)
