= Volutella pufferi =

Scientific classification
- Kingdom: Animalia
- Phylum: Mollusca
- Class: Gastropoda
- Subclass: Caenogastropoda
- Order: Neogastropoda
- Superfamily: Turbinelloidea
- Family: Vasidae
- Genus: Volutella
- Species: †V. pufferi

Binomial name
- †Volutella pufferi (W. K. Emerson, 1964)

Synonyms
- † Vasum (Vasum) pufferi W. K. Emerson, 1964 superseded combination

Species of gastropod

Volutella pufferi is an extinct species of medium to large sea snail, a marine gastropod mollusk in the family Vasidae.
