= Hermann Friedrich Bonorden =

German physician and mycologist

Hermann Friedrich Bonorden (28 August 1801 – 19 May 1884) was a German medical doctor and mycologist. During his career, he served as a Regimentarzt (regimental medical doctor) in Köln.

In 1866, Stephan Schulzer von Müggenburg named the fungi genus Bonordenia in his honor. The genus Bonordeniella was named after him by Albert Julius Otto Penzig and Pier Andrea Saccardo in 1901. Bonorden was the author of numerous mycological taxa; the following are some of the genera that he circumscribed:

- Fusicolla (1851).
- Hormomyces (1851).
- Cornicularia (1851), syn. Clavulinopsis.
- Polythecium (1861), syn. Fusicoccum.
- Byssitheca (1864), syn. Rosellinia.

== Written works ==
He was the author of books in the fields of medicine and mycology, the following are three of his mycological efforts:

- Handbuch der allgemeinen Mykologie, 1851 - Manual of general mycology.
- Zur Kenntniss einiger der wichtigsten Gattungen der Coniomyceten und Cryptomyceten, 1860 - To the knowledge of some of the major genera of Coniomycetes and Cryptomycetes.
- Abhandlungen aus dem Gebiete der Mykologie, 1864 - Treatises from the field of mycology.
