= Calostilbe =

Scientific classification
- Kingdom: Fungi
- Division: Ascomycota
- Class: Sordariomycetes
- Order: Hypocreales
- Family: Nectriaceae
- Genus: Calostilbe; Sacc. & P. Syd. 1902

Species
- Calostilbe ledermannii Calostilbe longiasca Calostilbe striispora

Genus of fungi

Calostilbe is a genus of ascomycete fungi in the family Nectriaceae.
