= Microcera =

Scientific classification
- Domain: Eukaryota
- Kingdom: Fungi
- Division: Ascomycota
- Class: Sordariomycetes
- Order: Hypocreales
- Family: Nectriaceae
- Genus: Microcera; Desm. (1848)

Type species
- Microcera coccophila Desm. (1848)

Genus of fungi

Microcera is a genus of Ascomycete fungi in the Nectriaceae family.

It was thought to be monotypic genus with only one species, Microcera coccophila Desm. (1848) As well as former species Microcera coccophila var. platyspora Sousa da Câmara (1920) being reclassified as Microcera coccophila. Microcera coccophila was initially found on the bark of young living trees of Salix and Fraxinus in France.

The genus has been considered as a synonym of genus Fusarium Link in major taxonomic revisions. Then Gräfenhan et al. in 2011 resurrected genus Microcera based on DNA sequence data and accepted four Microcera species, viz. M. coccophila, M. diploa (Berk. & M.A. Curtis) Gräfenhan & Seifert, M. rubra Gräfenhan & Seifert and M. larvarum (Fuckel) Gräfenhan, Seifert & Schroers. Lombard et al. then further investigated phylogenetic relationships of Microcera based on DNA sequence data and reported that it constitutes a lineage distantly related to Fusarium but closely related to Fusicolla and Macroconia. Both within the Nectriaceae family.

Then in 2021, 3 fungi were associated with Kuwanaspis howardi, a scale insect found on Phyllostachys heteroclada (fishscale bamboo) and Pleioblastus amarus (bitter bamboo) in China. New species Podonectria kuwanaspidis X.L. Xu & C.L. Yang sp. nov. and Podonectria novae-zelandiae Dingley, (both in Podonectriaceae family, Pleosporales order) as well as Microcera kuwanaspidis X.L. Xu & C.L. Yang sp. nov.

It has a cosmopolitan distribution worldwide.

== Species ==
As accepted by Species Fungorum;

- Microcera chrysomphali Liu Feng (2023)
- Microcera coccophila Desm. (1848)
- Microcera diploa (Berk. & M.A. Curtis) Gräfenhan & Seifert (2011)
- Microcera kuwanaspidis X.L. Xu & C.L. Yang (2021)
- Microcera larvarum (Fuckel) Gräfenhan, Seifert & Schroers (2011)
- Microcera physciae Crous & Boers (2021)
- Microcera pseudaulacaspidis Liu Feng (2023)
- Microcera rubra Gräfenhan & Seifert (2011)

Former species;

- M. acuminata (Ellis & Everh.) Höhn. (1919) = Fusarium acuminatum, Nectriaceae
- M. aurantiicola Petch (1921) = Microcera larvarum
- M. ciliata (Link) Wollenw. (1916) = Fusarium ciliatum, Nectriaceae
- M. clavariella Speg. (1886) = Cladosterigma clavariella, Exobasidiales
- M. coccophila var. platyspora Sousa da Câmara (1920) = Microcera coccophila
- M. curta Sacc. (1909) = Microcera larvarum
- M. fujikuroi Miyabe & Sawada (1913) = Microcera diploa
- M. henningsii (Koord.) Petch (1914) = Microcera diploa
- M. merrillii Syd. & P. Syd. (1914) = Microcera diploa
- M. orthospora Syd. (1924) = Mycogloea orthospora, Agaricostilbales
- M. parlatoriae Trab. (1907) = Microcera larvarum
- M. pluriseptata Cooke & Massee (1888) = Microcera coccophila
- M. rectispora Cooke & Massee (1887) = Tetracrium rectisporum, Podonectriaceae
- M. tasmaniensis McAlpine (1904) = Fusarium tasmaniense, Nectriaceae
- M. tonduzii Pat. (1912) = Microcera larvarum
