= Albonectria =

Scientific classification
- Kingdom: Fungi
- Division: Ascomycota
- Class: Sordariomycetes
- Order: Hypocreales
- Family: Nectriaceae
- Genus: Albonectria; Rossman & Samuels 1999

Type species
- Albonectria rigidiuscula (Berk. & Broome) Rossman & Samuels (1999)

Species
- Albonectria albida; Albonectria albosuccinea; Albonectria rigidiuscula; Albonectria verrucosa

Genus of fungi

Albonectria is a genus of ascomycete fungi in the family Nectriaceae.
