= Gliocephalotrichum =

Scientific classification
- Kingdom: Fungi
- Division: Ascomycota
- Class: Sordariomycetes
- Order: Hypocreales
- Family: Nectriaceae
- Genus: Gliocephalotrichum; J.J.Ellis & Hesselt.

Genus of fungi

Gliocephalotrichum is a genus of fungi belonging to the family Nectriaceae.

The genus was first described by J. J. Ellis and Clifford William Hesseltine in 1962.

The genus has cosmopolitan distribution.

Species:

- Gliocephalotrichum simplex (J.A.Mey.) B.J.Wiley & E.G.Simmons
