= Glionectria =

Scientific classification
- Kingdom: Fungi
- Division: Ascomycota
- Class: Sordariomycetes
- Order: Hypocreales
- Family: Nectriaceae
- Genus: Glionectria; Crous & S.L. Schoch 2000
- Species: G. tenuis

Binomial name
- Glionectria tenuis Crous & C.L. Schoch 2000

Genus of fungi

Glionectria is a genus of ascomycete fungi in the family Nectriaceae. It is a monotypic genus containing the sole species Glionectria tenuis.
