= Volutella floridana =

Scientific classification
- Kingdom: Animalia
- Phylum: Mollusca
- Class: Gastropoda
- Subclass: Caenogastropoda
- Order: Neogastropoda
- Superfamily: Turbinelloidea
- Family: Vasidae
- Genus: Volutella
- Species: †V. floridana

Binomial name
- †Volutella floridana (T. L. McGinty, 1940)

Synonyms
- † Vasum floridanum McGinty, 1940 superseded combination

Species of gastropod

Volutella floridana is an extinct species of medium to large sea snail, a marine gastropod mollusk in the family Turbinellidae.

== Distribution ==
Fossils of this marine species have been found in Tertiary strata of Florida, USA.
