= Rubrinectria =

Scientific classification
- Kingdom: Fungi
- Division: Ascomycota
- Class: Sordariomycetes
- Order: Hypocreales
- Family: Nectriaceae
- Genus: Rubrinectria; Rossman & Samuels 1999
- Species: R. olivacea

Binomial name
- Rubrinectria olivacea (Seaver) Rossman & Samuels 1999

Genus of fungi

Rubrinectria is a genus of ascomycete fungi in the family Nectriaceae. It is a monotypic genus containing the sole species Rubrinectria olivacea.
