= Cylindrocladiella parva =

Scientific classification
- Domain: Eukaryota
- Kingdom: Fungi
- Division: Ascomycota
- Class: Sordariomycetes
- Order: Hypocreales
- Family: Nectriaceae
- Genus: Cylindrocladiella
- Species: C. parva

Binomial name
- Cylindrocladiella parva (P.J.Anderson) Boesew. (1982)

Synonyms
- Cylindrocladium parvum P.J.Anderson (1919)

Species of fungus

Cylindrocladiella parva is a fungal plant pathogen.
