= Allonectella =

Scientific classification
- Kingdom: Fungi
- Division: Ascomycota
- Class: Sordariomycetes
- Order: Hypocreales
- Family: Nectriaceae
- Genus: Allonectella; Petr. 1950

Species
- Allonectella guaranitica Allonectella rubescens

Genus of fungi

Allonectella is a genus of ascomycete fungi in the family Nectriaceae.
