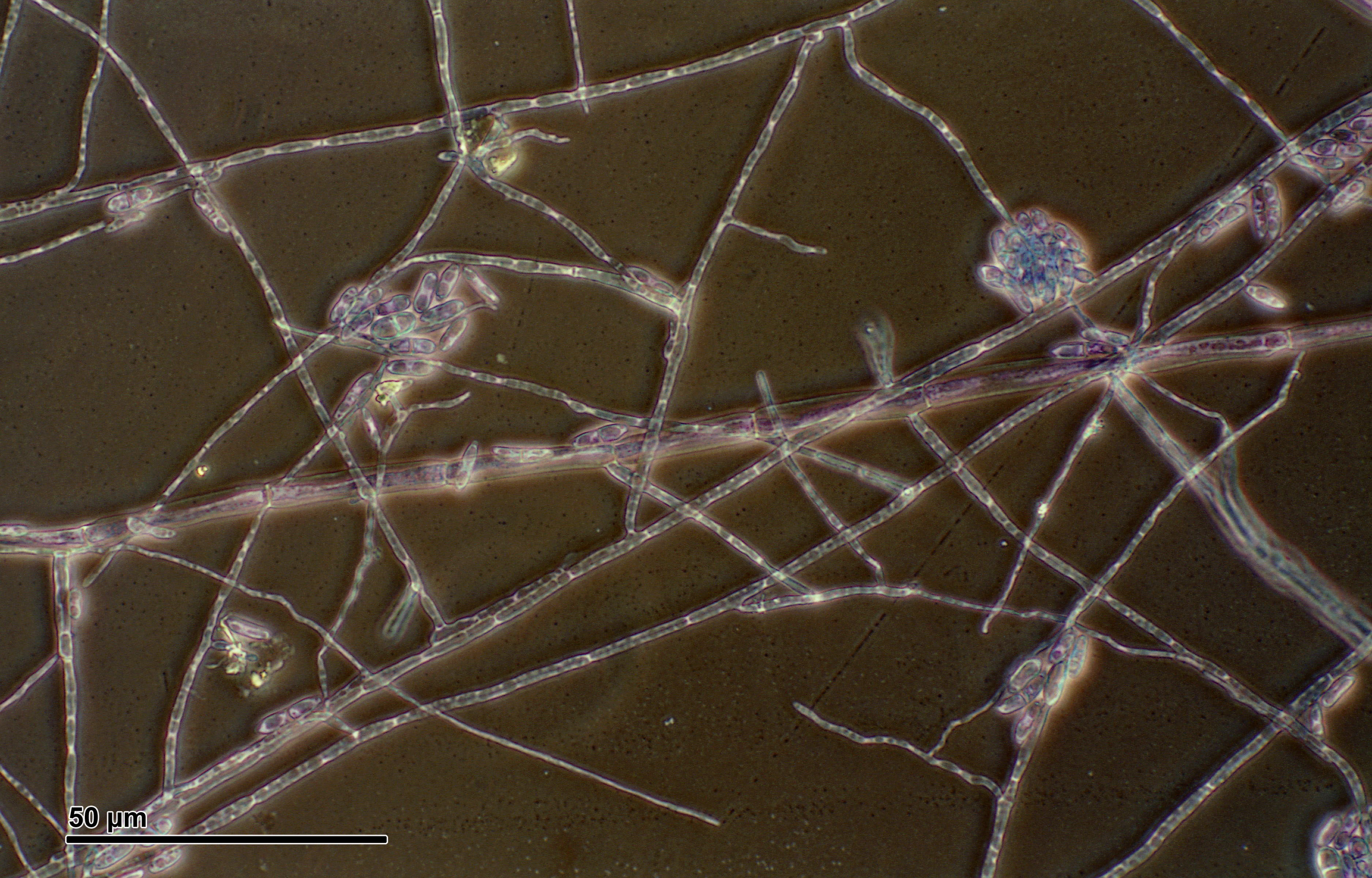
- Haematonectria haematococca

Scientific classification
- Kingdom: Fungi
- Division: Ascomycota
- Class: Sordariomycetes
- Order: Hypocreales
- Family: Nectriaceae
- Genus: Haematonectria; Samuels & Nirenberg 1999

Species
- Haematonectria haematococca Haematonectria illudens Haematonectria ipomoeae Haematonectria monilifera Haematonectria termitum

= Haematonectria =

Genus of fungi

Haematonectria is a genus of fungi in the family Nectriaceae.
