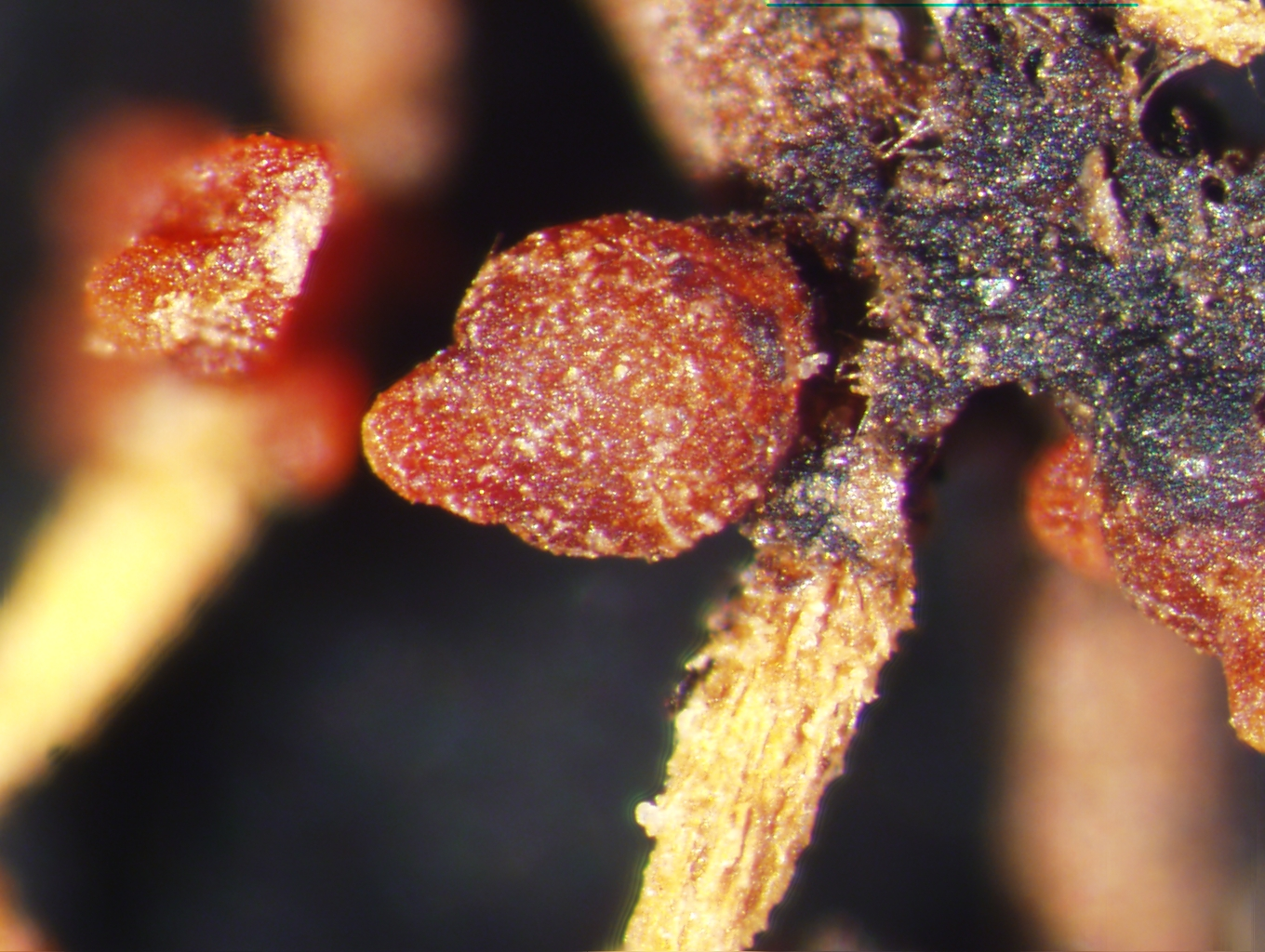
- Corallomycetella elegans

Scientific classification
- Domain: Eukaryota
- Kingdom: Fungi
- Division: Ascomycota
- Class: Sordariomycetes
- Order: Hypocreales
- Family: Nectriaceae
- Genus: Corallomycetella; Henn. 1904

Type species
- Corallomycetella heinsenii (Henn.) Henn. 1904

= Corallomycetella =

Genus of fungi

Corallomycetella is a genus of ascomycete fungi in the family Nectriaceae. Species of Corallomycetella are tropical, and are characterized by the formation of brightly colored rhizomorphs of their rhizostilbella-like asexual morphs. These fungi causes a number of plant diseases including 'violet root rot' of Theobroma cacao, root rot of Carica papaya, and 'stinking root disease' of several tropical woody plants. Two species of Corallomycetella are recognized: Corallomycetella elegans (Berk. and M.A. Curtis) C. Herrera & P. Chaverri and Corallomycetella repens (Berk. & Broome) Rossman & Samuels. Corallomycetella jatrophae is now classified under Corallonectria.
