= Chaetonectrioides =

Scientific classification
- Kingdom: Fungi
- Division: Ascomycota
- Class: Sordariomycetes
- Order: Hypocreales
- Family: Nectriaceae
- Genus: Chaetonectrioides; Matsush. (1996)

Type species
- Chaetonectrioides malaysiana Matsush. (1996)

Genus of fungi

Chaetonectrioides is a fungal genus in the Ascomycota. It is a monotypic genus containing the sole species Chaetonectrioides malaysiana, found in Peninsular Malaysia.
