= Phytophthora citrophthora =

Scientific classification
- Domain: Eukaryota
- Clade: Sar
- Clade: Stramenopiles
- Phylum: Oomycota
- Class: Peronosporomycetes
- Order: Peronosporales
- Family: Peronosporaceae
- Genus: Phytophthora
- Species: P. citrophthora

Binomial name
- Phytophthora citrophthora (R.E. Sm. & E.H. Sm.) Leonian, (1906)

Synonyms
- Phytophthora imperfecta var. citrophthora (R.E. Sm. & E.H. Sm.) Sarej., (1936); Pythiacystis citrophthora R.E. Sm. & E.H. Sm., (1906)

Species of oomycete

Phytophthora citrophthora, also known as brown rot of citrus, is a soil borne oomycete that infects several economically important citrus crops. A diagnostic symptom of P. citrophthora is gummosis, wherein lesions around the base of the tree exude sap. Other common symptoms include dark longitudinal lesions forming at the soil line, a sour smell, and eventual cracking of the bark. Advanced symptoms include yellowing and necrosis of the tree canopy. Girdling action caused by the pathogen around the trunk can often cause the collapse of the tree. Resistant lemon varieties have been developed and their implementation has been effective at controlling the spread of the disease. Fruits that have been infected with P. citrophthora exhibit symptoms of brown rot characterized by a distinct odor. This disease is most active in the moderate temperatures of spring, fall, and winter months, opposite of most other Phytophthora species.

== Environment ==
Environment is very important to oomycete life and reproduction. Once thought to be water molds, it is now known that they are in a distinct group called fungal like protists. Oomycetes have the ability to spread via zoospores whose multiple flagella require moisture in order to move. For infections to reach field scale, wind and rain conditions must provide adequate moisture for the polycyclic life cycle to occur. Phytophthora citrophthora is able to survive at lower temperatures with growth occurring at <5 °C but optimum growth occurring between 24 and 28 °C and no growth present past 35 °C. Phytophthora citrophthora is very commonly found in soils of citrus tree fields, which is where they often overwinter as oospores. This disease can also overwinter on decaying fruit and leaf litter left in the field after harvest as oospores.

== Control ==
Many control methods, including chemical and cultural, exist to combat the effects of infection by Phytophthora citrophthora. Cultural control of this disease mostly includes the use of resistant rootstocks and water management practices. Exposing seeds to water above 48.9 °C for 4–10 minutes can effectively kill spores before they can germinate and infect. Keeping grafting lines well above the soil line and adding a copper based fungicide also works to reduce rates of infection. Effective specific chemical controls include foliar applications of Fosetyl-Al and soil applications of metalaxyl.

== See also ==
- List of almond diseases
- List of cacao diseases
- List of chickpea diseases
- List of citrus diseases
- List of peach and nectarine diseases
- List of Persian walnut diseases
- List of pistachio diseases
- List of rhododendron diseases
- List of strawberry diseases
