= Nectricladiella =

Scientific classification
- Kingdom: Fungi
- Division: Ascomycota
- Class: Sordariomycetes
- Order: Hypocreales
- Family: Nectriaceae
- Genus: Nectricladiella; Crous & C.L. Schoch 2000

Species
- Nectricladiella camelliae Nectricladiella infestans

Genus of fungi

Nectricladiella is a genus of fungi in the family Nectriaceae.
