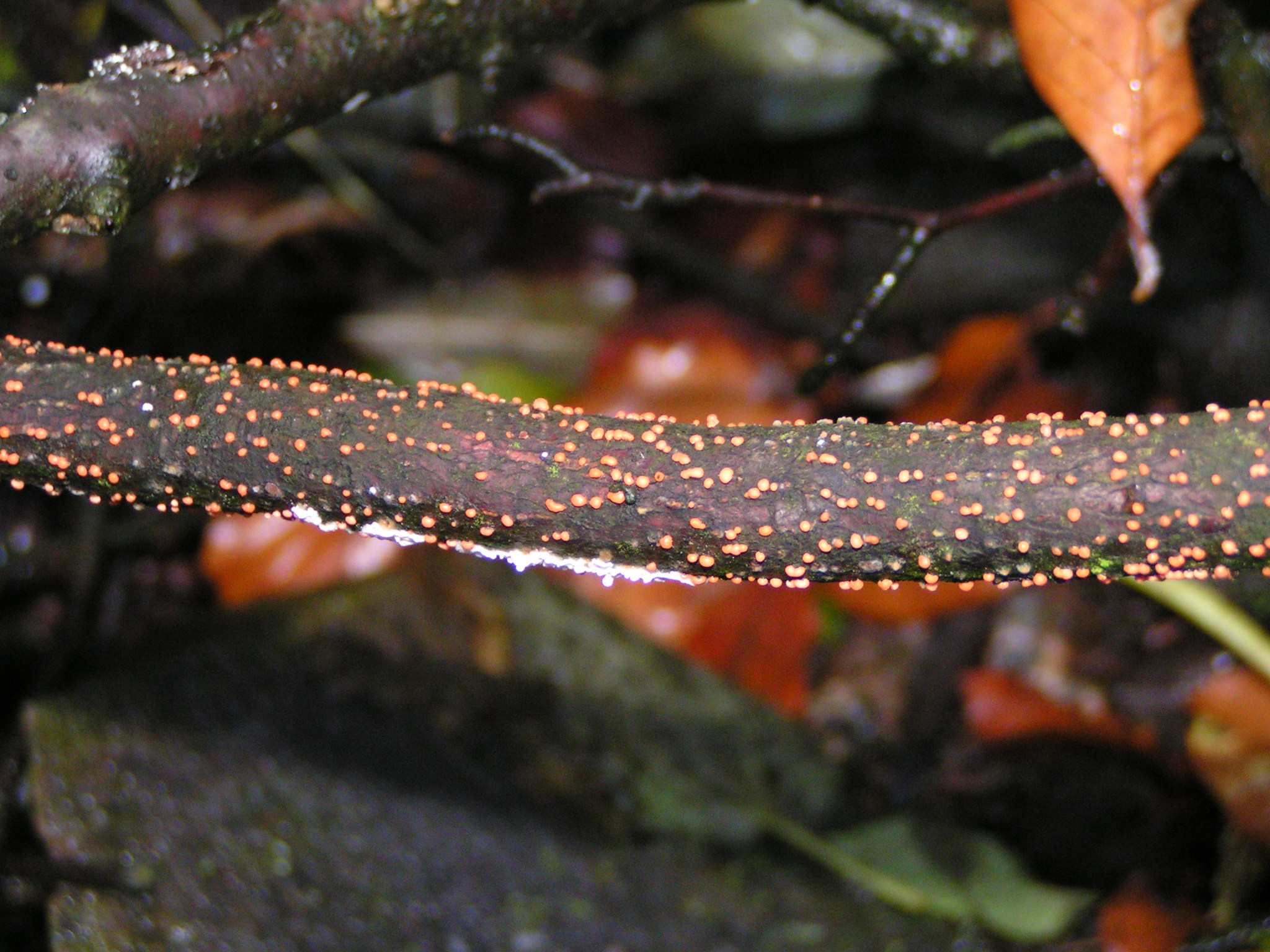

Scientific classification
- Kingdom: Fungi
- Division: Ascomycota
- Class: Sordariomycetes
- Order: Hypocreales
- Family: Nectriaceae
- Genus: Nectria
- Species: N. cinnabarina

Binomial name
- Nectria cinnabarina (Tode) Fr. (1849)

Synonyms
- Cucurbitaria cinnabarina Knyaria purpurea Knyaria vulgaris Nectria cinnabarina var. ribis Nectria fuscopurpurea Nectria ochracea Nectria purpurea Nectria ribis Sphaeria cinnabarina Sphaeria decolorans Sphaeria fragiformis Sphaeria ochracea Tremella purpurea Tubercularia confluens Tubercularia vulgaris

= Nectria cinnabarina =

Fungal plant pathogen

Nectria cinnabarina, also known as coral spot, is a plant pathogen that causes cankers on broadleaf trees. This disease is polycyclic and infects trees in the cool temperate regions of the Northern Hemisphere. N. cinnabarina is typically saprophytic, but will act as a weak parasite if presented with an opportunity via wounds in the tree or other stressors that weaken the tree's defense to the disease. A study published in 2011 showed that this complex consists of at least 4 distinct species. There are only a few ways to manage this disease with techniques such as sanitation and pruning away branches that have the cankers. N. cinnabarina is not as significant a problem as other Nectria spp., some of which are the most important pathogens to infect hardwood trees.

== Hosts and symptoms ==
Nectria cinnabarina, also known as coral spot, is a weak pathogen of broadleaf trees. While beech is the main host, the parasite can also affect Sycamore, Horse Chestnut, and Hornbeam. This pathogen usually affects trees that have already been weakened as a result of stressful factors, such as drought or fungal infestation. Physical damage can also make the tree susceptible to the pathogen. The pathogen forms pink fungal blobs (indicative of its sexual stage) on the outside of dead wood which turn a reddish-brown color and become quite hard. The blobs are usually 1 to 4 mm in length. Other symptoms include small twigs and branches dying back and branch necrosis. The bark that is infected becomes weak and tends to snap off in windy weather. The pathogen thrives in dead wood and airborne spores infect living trees and shrubs through wounds. Since it is caused by a weak fungus, isolation of the pathogen from diseased tissue and an analysis for fungal properties, such as induced sporulation or microscopically seeing cross-walls in hyphae, can aid in diagnosis. Furthermore, many fungi studies in media involve the formation of concentric hyphal zonations or rings of sporulation as the colony develops. This zonation is usually attributed to environmental changes. The sporulation rhythm of N. cinnabarina is conveyed by concentric rings or spirals and is dependent on temperature.

== Disease cycle ==
Typically, N. cinnabarina grows as a saprophyte on dead wood. If a plant is wounded, the pathogen becomes an opportunistic weak parasite and infects susceptible plants. The complex life cycle of the N. cinnabarina would be characterized as polycyclic because it is capable of several infection cycles. During spring or early summer, coral pink or light purplish red spore-producing structures form. These age to tan or brown. This is the sexual stage and is distinguished by the aforementioned pink structures, which are tough perithecia that produce sexual spores. Because N. cinnabarina has sporodochial anamorphs, the perithecia form within the sporodochium. In summer and autumn, orange-red fruiting structures are produced; eventually these structures mature to dark red and can survive through the winter. This is the asexual stage and it is characterized by spongy conidia which can be distinguished by the hard, dark red blobs on the bark. Both of these structures release spores that can be dispersed by water and invade susceptible tissue.

== Environment ==
Nectria cinnabarina is common in the cool, temperate regions of the Northern Hemisphere. It is widespread throughout the UK and parts of mainland Europe, typically wherever there are hosts for the pathogen. The fungus enters the plant by wounds caused by improper pruning, storm damage, and other types of mechanical damage. Infection typically occurs in these wounds when there is a surplus of water, and the temperature is above freezing. Infection is most common in the spring and fall.

== Management ==
There are only a few ways to manage disease caused by N. cinnabarina. One way to control the spread of this fungus is pruning branches of trees that have cankers. N. cinnabarina is a saprophyte and mainly resides in and on dead tissue, but as the fungus progresses, it invades living tissue and causes further disease. Trimming the areas so that no dead tissue remains is important because this removes the areas where the fungus is spreading from dead tissue to living tissue.

Another important control measure is to make sure all pruning tools are sanitized. This will prevent the spread of the fungus from infected branches to healthy branches. Pruning should be done during dry periods to prevent the possibility of creating a wound in the tree while the fungus is sporulating. N. cinnabarina is an opportunistic weak parasite that will mainly affect trees that are stressed. Choosing tree species that grow well in the environmental conditions of the area is a good way to keep them from being stressed.

Drought stress, root pruning, and transplantation of trees are all stressors that may cause susceptibility to infection by this fungus and these processes should generally be avoided if the fungus is suspected to be present. Keeping trees from being stressed is important because the natural defense of trees is to form cankers around infected areas, which contain the fungus and prevent it from spreading. However, stressed trees have a slower canker response, which allows the fungus to proliferate and spread to other areas of the tree and may eventually lead to death of the tree.

== Importance ==
The pathogen was first described in 1791 when the German mycologist and theologian Heinrich Julius Tode described this fungus under the scientific name, Sphaeria cinnabarina. This name was changed when Swedish mycologist Elias Magnus Fries transferred the species to the Nectria genus in 1849. The currently adopted scientific name, Nectria cinnabarina, was then born. According to the article “The Range and Importance of Nectaria Canker on hardwoods in the NorthEast” by D.S. Welch, one of the most important pathogens to affect hardwood trees is the Nectria genus, or Nectria canker caused by Nectria spp. The Nectria Canker is a fungal infection of the cortex and cambium that spreads slowly over the years. N. cinnabarina is not as significant a problem as other Nectria spp., some of which are the most important to infect hardwoods.

== Pathogenesis ==
Nectria cinnabarina is typically saprophytic but will act as a weak parasite if presented with an opportunity via wounds in the tree or other stressors that weaken the tree's defense to the disease. When a tree is stressed it has a slower response to infection by N. cinnabarina, which allows the fungus to continue spreading throughout the tree and cause further infection. N. cinnabarina typically invades dead tissue first and then spreads to living tissue via hyphae that grow through the xylem. This causes dieback and allows further colonization of the fungus. It is also possible for the spores of the pathogen to infect living tissue through the lenticels, but this typically only occurs in stressed plants.
