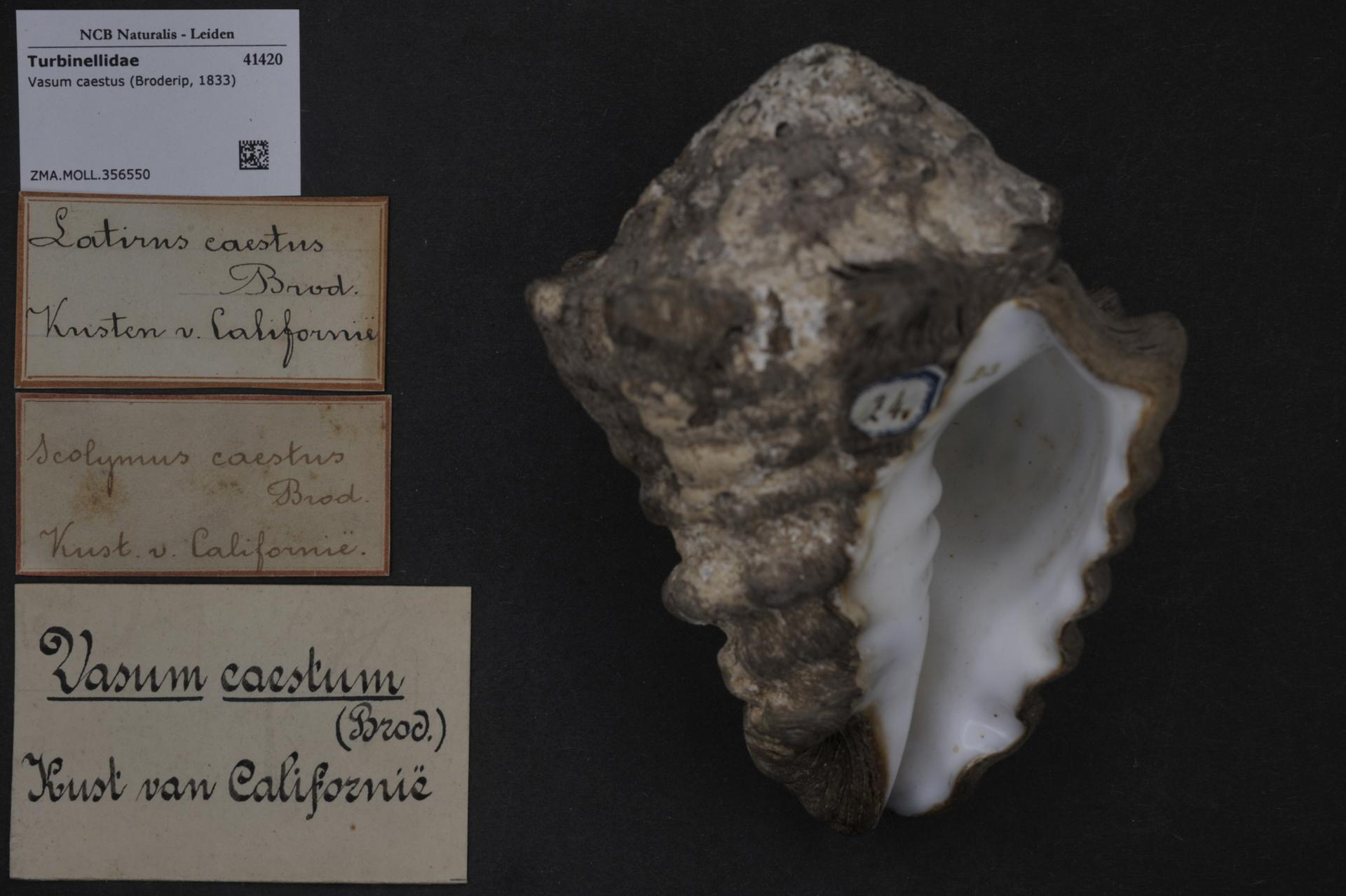
- Shell of Volutella caestus (specimen at Naturalis Biodiversity Center)

Scientific classification
- Kingdom: Animalia
- Phylum: Mollusca
- Class: Gastropoda
- Subclass: Caenogastropoda
- Order: Neogastropoda
- Superfamily: Turbinelloidea
- Family: Vasidae
- Genus: Volutella
- Species: V. caestus

Binomial name
- Volutella caestus (Broderip, 1833)

Synonyms
- Turbinella ardeola Valenciennes, 1832; Turbinella caestus Broderip, 1833 (original combination); Vasum caestus (Broderip, 1833) superseded combination

= Volutella caestus =

Species of gastropod

Volutella caestus, common name the helmet vase, is a species of medium to large sea snail, a marine gastropod mollusk in the family Vasidae.

== Distribution ==
This marine species occurs in the Caribbean Sea (Florida, West Indies) and in the Pacific Ocean (Mexico, Panama, Ecuador, Galapagos Islands).

== Shell description ==
The length of the shell varies between 57 mm and 135 mm.

(Original description in Latin) The shell is somewhat rhomboid in shape, extremely thick and very heavy, and white in color. The body whorl is longitudinally somewhat folded, angled, and transversely grooved; the angle is armed with very large, sharp, conical tubercles, and marked by very deep grooves. The basal ridges are tuberculate, with the penultimate ridge being the largest. The columella bears four folds. The outer lip is sinuate. The epidermis is thick and longitudinally striated. The umbilicus is large.
