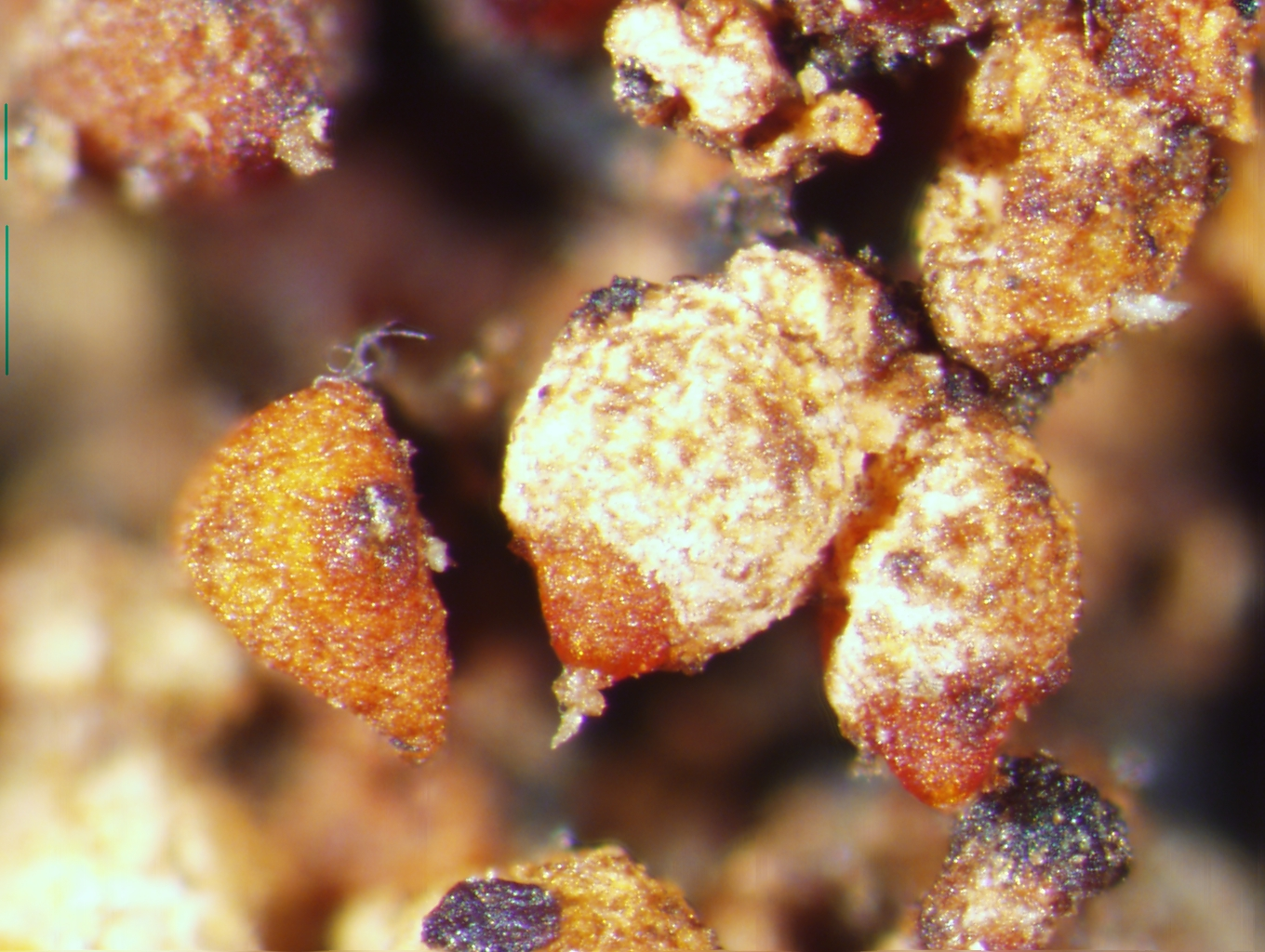
- Corallomycetella jatrophae

Scientific classification
- Kingdom: Fungi
- Division: Ascomycota
- Class: Sordariomycetes
- Order: Hypocreales
- Family: Nectriaceae
- Genus: Corallonectria; C. Herrera & P. Chaverri 2013

Type species
- Corallonectria jatrophae (Möller) C. Herrera & P. Chaverri 2013

Synonyms
- Corallomyces jatrophae Möller, (1901); Corallomycetella jatrophae (Möller) Rossman & Samuels, (1999); Nectria jatrophae (Möller) Wollenw., (1931)

= Corallonectria =

Genus of fungi

Corallonectria is a genus of ascomycete fungi in the family Nectriaceae. Species of Corallonectria are Neotropical. These fungi are characterized by the formation of brightly colored rhizomorphs and of copulated synnematous fusarium-like asexual morphs in culture. The asexual morph in nature has been rarely observed (e.g. a specimen collection from Panama in Mushroom Observer). The sexual fruiting bodies are furfuraceous and usually seated at the base of a reddish synnemata. It is a monotypic genus containing the sole species Corallonectria jatrophae. This species was formerly classified under Corallomycetella.
