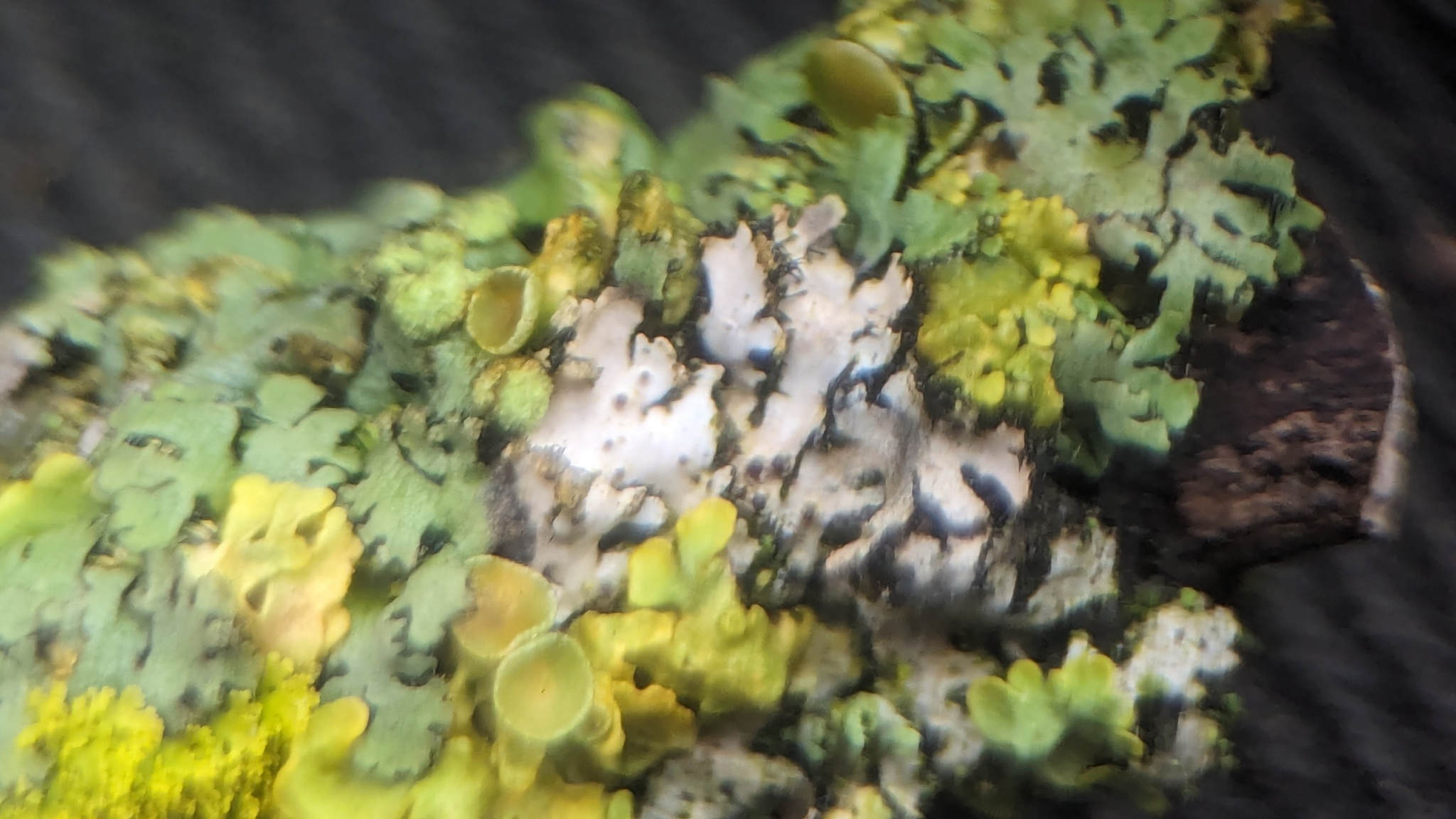
- Xenonectriella physciacearum

Scientific classification
- Kingdom: Fungi
- Division: Ascomycota
- Class: Sordariomycetes
- Order: Hypocreales
- Family: Nectriaceae
- Genus: Xenonectriella; Weese (1919)

Type species
- Xenonectriella lutescens (Arnold) Weese (1919)

Species
- see text

= Xenonectriella =

Genus of fungi

Xenonectriella is a genus of lichenicolous fungi in the family Nectriaceae. The genus was circumscribed by lichenologist Josef Karl Weese in 1919, with Xenonectriella lutescens assigned as the type species.

== Species ==
- Xenonectriella aurantiaca Etayo (2008)
- Xenonectriella calabrica Brackel & Puntillo (2016)
- Xenonectriella coppinsiana Etayo (2017)
- Xenonectriella dirinariae Etayo & van den Boom (2013)
- Xenonectriella fissuriprodiens (Etayo) Etayo (2017)
- Xenonectriella humilis Etayo (2008)
- Xenonectriella leptaleoides (Etayo) Etayo (2008)
- Xenonectriella lutescens (Arnold ex Rehm) Weese (1919)
- Xenonectriella nephromatis Pérez-Ort. (2020) – Alaska
- Xenonectriella ornamentata (D.Hawksw.) Rossman (1999)
- Xenonectriella physciacearum F.Berger, E.Zimm. & Brackel (2020)
- Xenonectriella protopannariae (Zhurb.) Brackel (2014)
- Xenonectriella rosea Etayo (2008)
- Xenonectriella rugulatispora Etayo (2017)
- Xenonectriella septemseptata (Etayo) Etayo & van den Boom (2014)
- Xenonectriella streimannii (S.Y.Kondr.) Rossman (1999)
- Xenonectriella subimperspicua (Speg.) Etayo (2017)
- Xenonectriella vertebrata Etayo (2017)
