= Volutella tribulosa =

Scientific classification
- Kingdom: Animalia
- Phylum: Mollusca
- Class: Gastropoda
- Subclass: Caenogastropoda
- Order: Neogastropoda
- Superfamily: Turbinelloidea
- Family: Vasidae
- Genus: Volutella
- Species: †V. tribulosa

Binomial name
- †Volutella tribulosa (E. H. Vokes, 1970)

Species of gastropod

Volutella tribulosa is an extinct species of medium to large sea snail, a marine gastropod mollusk in the family Vasidae.

== Description ==
Measurements of the shell: 87.0 x 62.0 mm.

== Distribution ==
Fossils of this marine species have been found in Miocene strata of the Florida, USA dating back to between 220.43 and 15.97 Ma.
