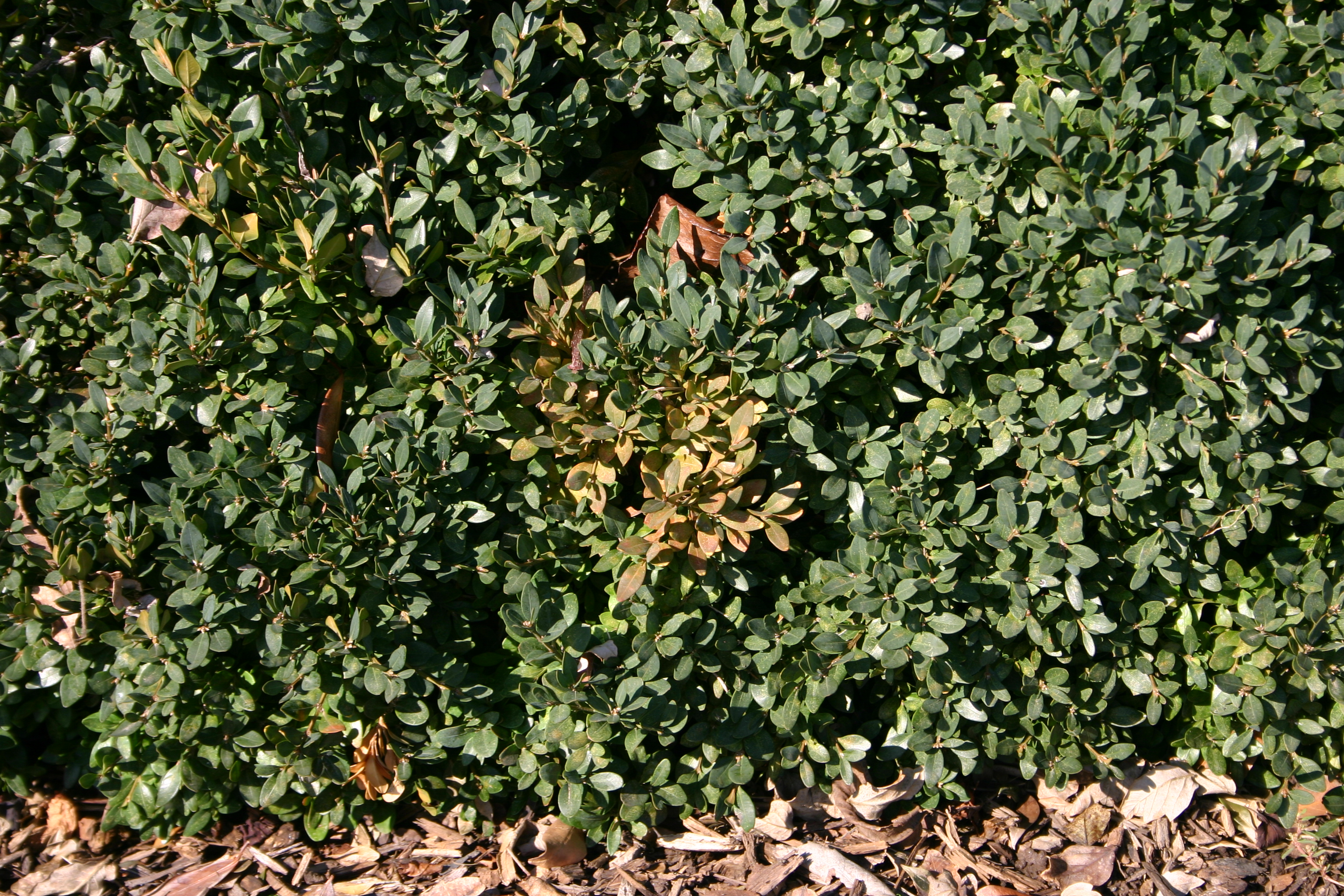

Scientific classification
- Kingdom: Fungi
- Division: Ascomycota
- Class: Sordariomycetes
- Order: Hypocreales
- Family: Nectriaceae
- Genus: Volutella; Fr., 1832,

Type species
- Volutella ciliata

= Volutella (fungus) =

Genus of fungi

Volutella is a genus of fungi belonging to the family Nectriaceae.

The fungal genus was established by Fries (1832) with Volutella ciliata (Alb. & Schwein.) Fr. as the type species. It had about 47 species in 2011, however, many species were later revised and transferred to other genera such as Calonectria, Coccinonectria, Lectera, Koorchaloma, Pseudonectria and Volutellonectria and only 11 species have sequence data in GenBank. Gräfenhan et al. (2011) then revised the genus and accepted three species, viz. Volutella ciliata, Volutella consors and Volutella citrinella into Volutella. Later, seven additional species were introduced in the genus.

The genus is characterized by discoid sporodochia (or synnemata) with marginal setae, sparingly branched to verticillate conidiophores, compact and phialidic conidiogenous cells, and 1-celled, ovoid to oblong conidia. A second asexual morph is present in some species with two or more whorls of conidiogenous cells.

== Species ==
As accepted by Species Fungorum, although many are now classified in other genera.

- Volutella aeria Z.F. Zhang & L. Cai (2017)
- Volutella arundinis Desm. (1830)
- Volutella asiana (J. Luo, X.M. Zhang & W.Y. Zhuang) L. Lombard & Crous (2015)
- Volutella caricicola Miles (1926)
- Volutella cassiicola V. Rao (1962)
- Volutella cinerascens (Ces.) Sacc. (1886)
- Volutella citrinella (Cooke & Massee) Seifert (2011)
- Volutella delonicis R.H. Perera, E.B.G. Jones & K.D. Hyde (2020)
- Volutella gilva (Pers.) Sacc. (1881)
- Volutella jaapii Bres. (1908)
- Volutella kamatii Narayanan (1962)
- Volutella keratinolytica Dominik & Majchr. (1964)
- Volutella krabiensis Tibpromma & K.D. Hyde (2018)
- Volutella leucaenae R.H. Perera, Maharachch., E.B.G. Jones & K.D. Hyde (2023)
- Volutella lini Mukerji, J.P. Tewari & J.N. Rai (1968)
- Volutella lohwagii Petr. (1948)
- Volutella nectrioides Sacc. (1917)
- Volutella nivea (Fr.) Sacc. (1886)
- Volutella pachysandrae W.G. Hutch. (1929)
- Volutella pini-caribaeae Tak. Kobay. (1980)
- Volutella putaminum Kirschst. (1939)
- Volutella queenslandica Matsush. (1989)
- Volutella ramkumarii A.K. Sarbhoy (1967)
- Volutella roseola Cooke (1872)
- Volutella salmonis Marchenko (1985)
- Volutella salvadorae Crous (2021)
- Volutella setosa (Grev.) Berk. (1860)
- Volutella thailandensis Tibpromma & K.D. Hyde (2018)
- Volutella therryana Sacc. (1886)
- Volutella uredinophila Syd. (1927)

Former species (all are Nectriaceae, unless stated);

- V. buxi (DC.) Berk. & Broome (1850) = Pseudonectria buxi
- V. buxi f. rusci Sacc. (1882) = Pseudonectria buxi
- V. ciliata (Alb. & Schwein.) Fr. (1832) = Scolecofusarium ciliatum
- V. ciliata var. stipitata (Lib.) Sacc. (1881) = Scolecofusarium ciliatum
- V. circinans (Berk.) F. Stevens & E.Y. True (1919) = Colletotrichum circinans, Glomerellaceae
- V. colletotrichoides J.E. Chilton (1955) = Lectera colletotrichoides, Plectosphaerellaceae
- V. colletotrichoides var. setosa J.E. Chilton (1955) = Lectera colletotrichoides, Plectosphaerellaceae
- V. comata Ellis (1882) = Volutellonectria consors
- V. consors (Ellis & Everh.) Seifert, Gräfenhan & Schroers (2011) = Volutellonectria consors
- V. discoidea (Berk. & Broome) Sacc. (1886) = Dothiorina discoidea, Chlorociboriaceae
- V. fructi F.Stevens & J.G. Hall (1907) = Colletotrichum fructi, Glomerellaceae
- V. gilva f. effusa Sacc. (1897) = Volutella gilva
- V. gilva f. rosea Sacc. (1882) = Volutella gilva
- V. gilva subsp. intricata (P. Karst.) Sacc. (1892) = Volutella gilva
- V. gilva var. albopilosa Pound & Clem. (1896) = Volutella gilva
- V. gilva var. rosea Sacc. (1882) = Volutella gilva
- V. intricata P. Karst. (1888) = Volutella gilva
- V. melaloma Berk. & Broome (1850) = Koorchaloma melaloma, Sordariomycetes
- V. minima Höhn. (1909) = Volutellonectria consors
- V. pachysandricola B.O. Dodge (1944) = Coccinonectria pachysandricola
- V. piracicabana Verona & P. Joly (1956) = Xepicula leucotricha, Ascomycota
- V. rosea (Sacc.) Mussat (1901) = Volutella gilva
- V. rusci (Sacc.) Sacc. (1886) = Pseudonectria buxi
- V. stipitata (Lib.) Cooke (1872) = Scolecofusarium ciliatum
- V. vitis (Bonord.) Sacc. (1886) = Cyphella vitis, Cyphellaceae
