= Payosphaeria =

Scientific classification
- Kingdom: Fungi
- Division: Ascomycota
- Class: Sordariomycetes
- Order: Hypocreales
- Family: incertae sedis
- Genus: Payosphaeria; W.F. Leong

Type species
- Payosphaeria minuta H.Y.M. Leung

Genus of fungi

Payosphaeria is a genus of fungi in the Hypocreales order. The relationship of this taxon to other taxa within the order is unknown (incertae sedis), and it has not yet been placed with certainty into any family. This is a monotypic genus, containing the single species Payosphaeria minuta.
