= Pseudonectria =

Scientific classification
- Kingdom: Fungi
- Division: Ascomycota
- Class: Sordariomycetes
- Order: Hypocreales
- Family: Nectriaceae
- Genus: Pseudonectria; Seaver 1909

Species
- See text.

Genus of fungi

Pseudonectria is a genus of fungi in the family Nectriaceae.

== Species ==
- Pseudonectria aquifolii
- Pseudonectria bambusae
- Pseudonectria bambusina
- Pseudonectria callorioides
- Pseudonectria casaresii
- Pseudonectria ciliata
- Pseudonectria coffeicola
- Pseudonectria collorioides
- Pseudonectria furfurella
- Pseudonectria gigaspora
- Pseudonectria maranhensis
- Pseudonectria musae
- Pseudonectria ornata
- Pseudonectria pachysandricola
- Pseudonectria pipericola
- Pseudonectria reticulospora
- Pseudonectria rousseliana
- Pseudonectria strasseri
- Pseudonectria sulphurata
- Pseudonectria tabacina
- Pseudonectria tilachlidii
