= Persiciospora =

Scientific classification
- Kingdom: Fungi
- Division: Ascomycota
- Class: Sordariomycetes
- Order: Coronophorales
- Family: Ceratostomataceae
- Genus: Persiciospora; P.F. Cannon & D. Hawksw. 1982

Species
- Persiciospora africana Persiciospora japonica Persiciospora masonii Persiciospora moreaui

Genus of fungi

Persiciospora is a genus of fungus in the Ceratostomataceae family.
