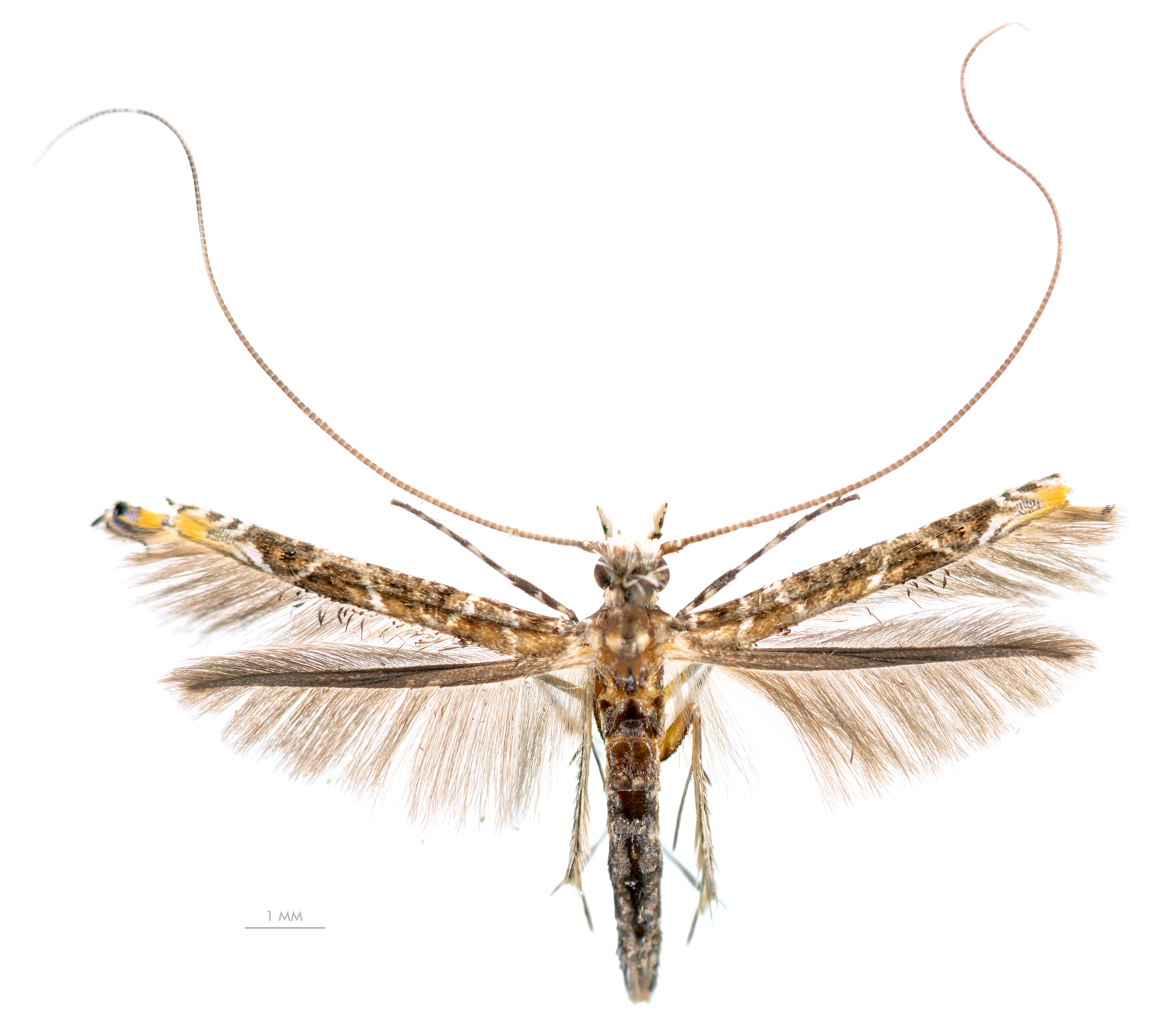
- Adult specimen, emerged from larva collected on rambutan

Scientific classification
- Kingdom: Animalia
- Phylum: Arthropoda
- Clade: Pancrustacea
- Class: Insecta
- Order: Lepidoptera
- Family: Gracillariidae
- Genus: Conopomorpha
- Species: C. cramerella

Binomial name
- Conopomorpha cramerella (Snellen, 1904)

Synonyms
- Gracilaria cramerella Snellen, 1904; Acrocercops hierocosma Meyrick, 1912

= Conopomorpha cramerella =

Cocoa pod borer

Species of moth

Conopomorpha cramerella, the cocoa pod borer, is a moth of the family Gracillariidae. It is known from Saudi Arabia, China, India (West Bengal, Andaman Islands), Thailand, Brunei, Indonesia (Sumatra, Sulawesi, Papua, Papua Barat, Java, Kalimantan, Moluccas), Malaysia (Peninsula, Sarawak, Sabah), Vietnam, Australia, New Britain, the Philippines, Samoa, the Solomon Islands, Sri Lanka, Vanuatu, and Australia (Northern Territory).

The larvae feed on Cynometra cauliflora, Swietenia species, Dimocarpus longan, Litchi chinensis, Nephelium lappaceum, Nephelium litchi, Nephelium malainse, Nephelium mutabile, Pometia species (including Pometia pinnata), Cola species and Theobroma cacao.
