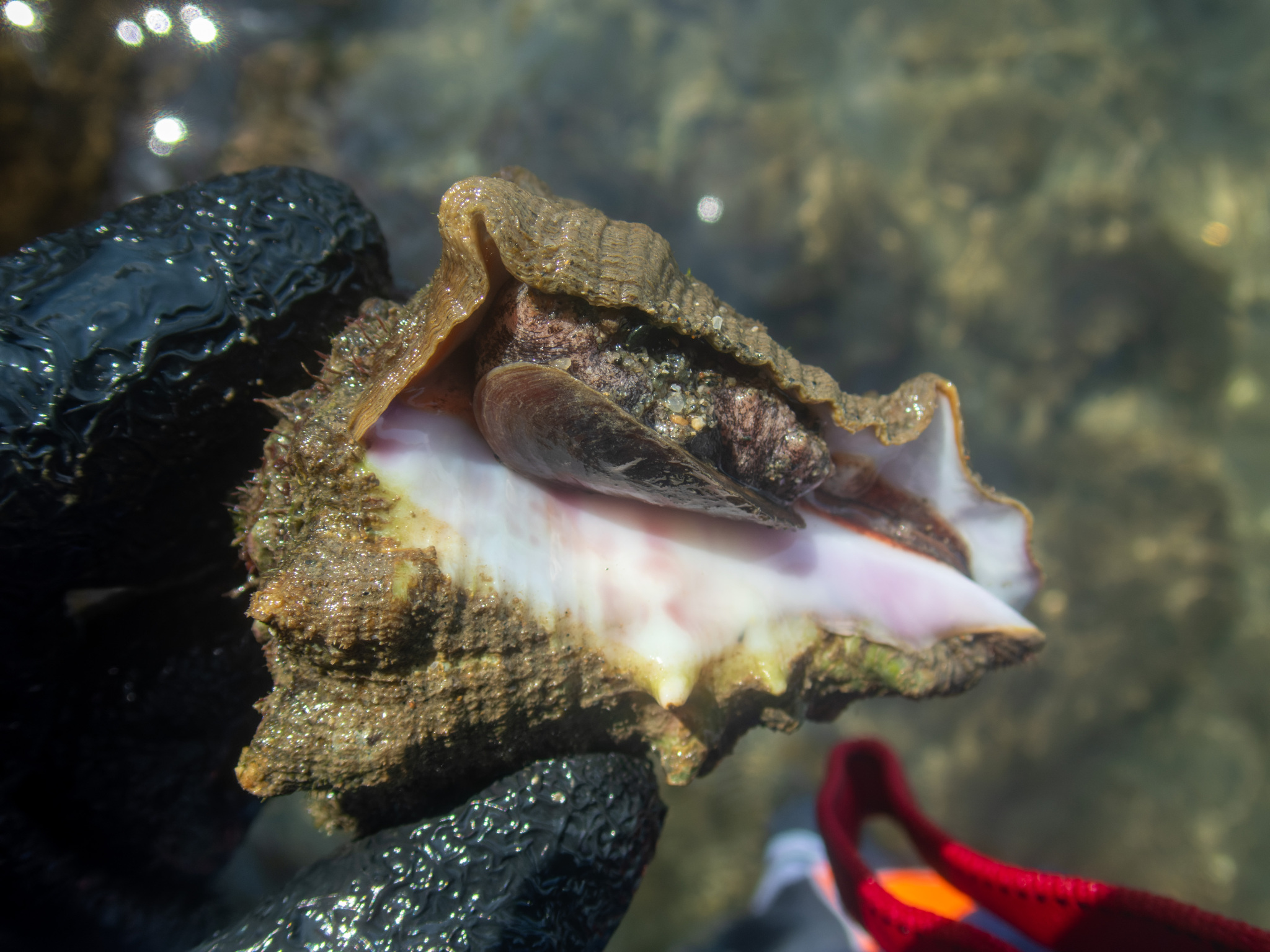
- Volutella muricata, Colombia

Scientific classification
- Kingdom: Animalia
- Phylum: Mollusca
- Class: Gastropoda
- Subclass: Caenogastropoda
- Order: Neogastropoda
- Family: Vasidae
- Genus: Volutella; G. Perry, 1810

= Volutella (gastropod) =

Genus of gastropods

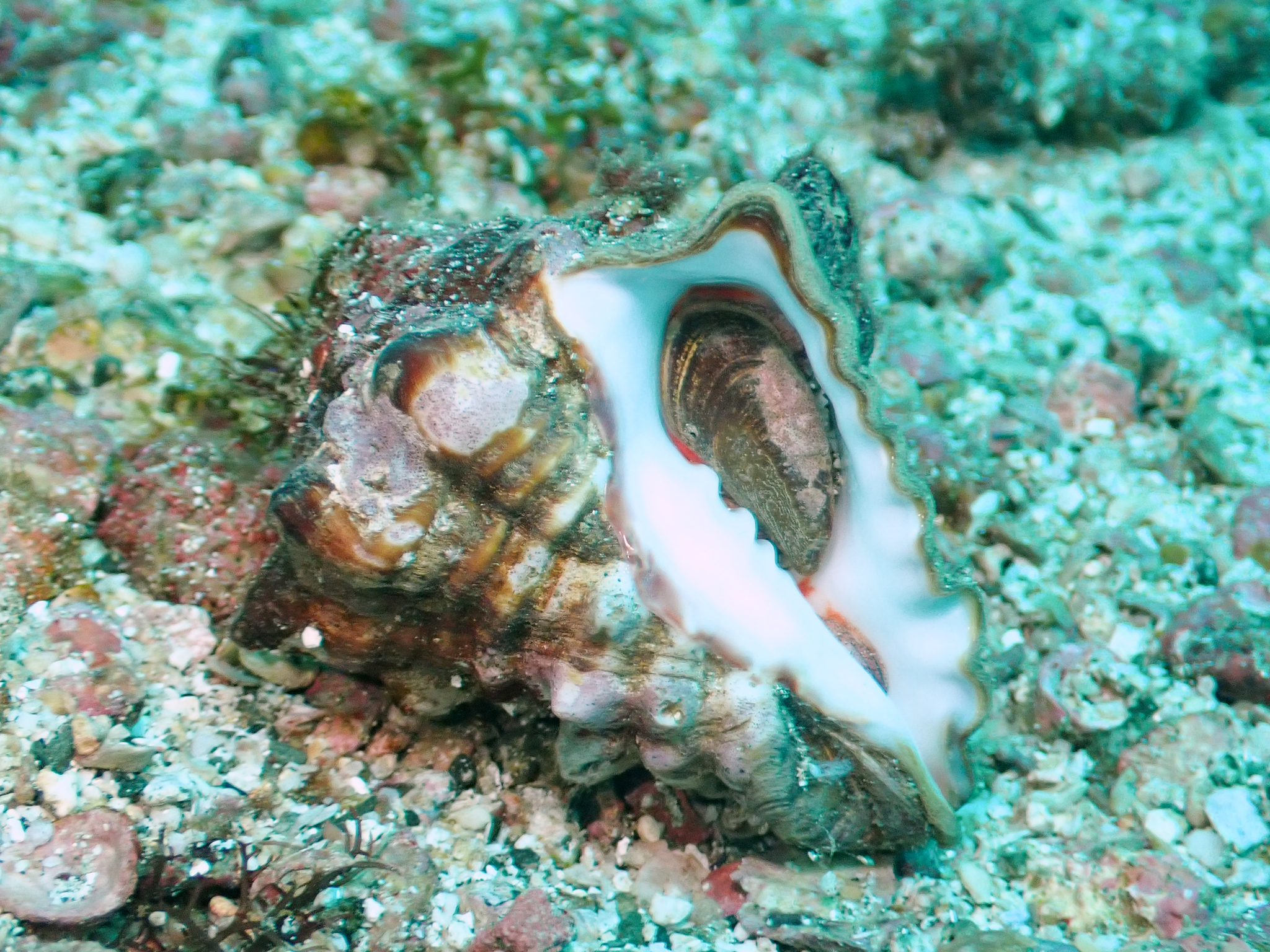
Volutella caestus, Panama

Volutella is a genus of chank shells in the family Vasidae. There are six described species in Volutella, four of which are extinct.

They are found in the Caribbean and off the Pacific Coast from Mexico to Ecuador.

== Species ==
These six species belong to the genus Volutella:

- Volutella caestus (Broderip, 1833)
- † Volutella floridana (T. L. McGinty, 1940)
- † Volutella haitensis (G. B. Sowerby I, 1850)
- Volutella muricata (Born, 1778)
- † Volutella pufferi (W. K. Emerson, 1964)
- † Volutella tribulosa (E. H. Vokes, 1970)

Synonyms

- † Volutella crenata (Michelotti, 1861): synonym of † Vasum cancellatum ^{(Grateloup, 1845}): synonym of † Globivasum cancellatum (Grateloup, 1845)
- Volutella divergens G. Perry, 1810: synonym of Vasum muricatum (Born, 1778): synonym of Volutella muricata (Born, 1778) (junior subjective synonym)
- Volutella nigra Perry, 1811: synonym of Vasum turbinellus (Linnaeus, 1758)
- Volutella rubescens Perry, 1811: synonym of Vasum capitellum (Linnaeus, 1758): synonym of Globivasum capitellum (Linnaeus, 1758)
