= Cylindrocladiella =

Scientific classification
- Kingdom: Fungi
- Division: Ascomycota
- Class: Sordariomycetes
- Order: Hypocreales
- Family: Nectriaceae
- Genus: Cylindrocladiella; Boesew. (1982)

Species
- See text

Genus of fungi

Cylindrocladiella is a genus of ascomycete fungi in the family Nectriaceae. There are 67 species.

== Species ==
Cylindrocladiella contains the following species:

- Cylindrocladiella addiensis L. Lombard & Crous
- Cylindrocladiella arbusta N.Q. Pham, T.Q. Pham & M.J. Wingf.
- Cylindrocladiella australiensis L. Lombard & Crous
- Cylindrocladiella brevistipitata L. Lombard & Crous
- Cylindrocladiella clavata L. Lombard & Crous
- Cylindrocladiella curvata W.W. Zhou & S.F. Chen bis
- Cylindrocladiella cylindrica W.W. Zhou & S.F. Chen bis
- Cylindrocladiella cymbiformis L. Lombard & Crous
- Cylindrocladiella dengfengensis W.W. Zhou & S.F. Chen bis
- Cylindrocladiella dianensis W.W. Zhou, Ya B. Deng & S.F. Chen bis
- Cylindrocladiella diversa W.W. Zhou & S.F. Chen bis
- Cylindrocladiella elegans Crous & M.J. Wingf.
- Cylindrocladiella ellipsoidea L. Lombard & Crous
- Cylindrocladiella fafuana W.W. Zhou, Ya B. Deng & S.F. Chen bis
- Cylindrocladiella guiyangensis S.B. Wang, C. Norph. & Y. Wang bis
- Cylindrocladiella hahajimaensis (Ts. Watan.) Inderb., R.M. Bostock & Subbarao
- Cylindrocladiella hawaiiensis L. Lombard & Crous
- Cylindrocladiella heilongjiangensis W.W. Zhou & S.F. Chen bis
- Cylindrocladiella henanensis W.W. Zhou & S.F. Chen bis
- Cylindrocladiella horticola L. Lombard & Crous
- Cylindrocladiella humicola L. Lombard & Crous
- Cylindrocladiella infestans Boesew.
- Cylindrocladiella jianfenglingensis W.W. Zhou & S.F. Chen bis
- Cylindrocladiella kurandica L. Lombard & Crous
- Cylindrocladiella lageniformis Crous, M.J. Wingf. & Alfenas
- Cylindrocladiella lanceolata L. Lombard & Crous
- Cylindrocladiella lateralis L. Lombard & Crous
- Cylindrocladiella ledongensis W.W. Zhou & S.F. Chen bis
- Cylindrocladiella longiphialidica L. Lombard & Crous
- Cylindrocladiella longispora W.W. Zhou & S.F. Chen bis
- Cylindrocladiella longistipitata L. Lombard & Crous
- Cylindrocladiella malesiana N.Q. Pham & M.J. Wingf.
- Cylindrocladiella montana W.W. Zhou & S.F. Chen bis
- Cylindrocladiella motuoensis W.W. Zhou & S.F. Chen bis
- Cylindrocladiella natalensis L. Lombard & Crous
- Cylindrocladiella nauliensis L. Lombard & Crous
- Cylindrocladiella nederlandica L. Lombard & Crous
- Cylindrocladiella novae-zelandiae (Boesew.) Boesew.
- Cylindrocladiella obpyriformis N.Q. Pham, T.Q. Pham & M.J. Wingf.
- Cylindrocladiella parva (P.J. Anderson) Boesew.
- Cylindrocladiella parviconidia W.W. Zhou & S.F. Chen bis
- Cylindrocladiella parvispora N.Q. Pham, T.Q. Pham & M.J. Wingf.
- Cylindrocladiella postalofficium Crous 2019
- Cylindrocladiella pseudocamelliae L. Lombard & Crous
- Cylindrocladiella pseudohawaiiensis L. Lombard & Crous
- Cylindrocladiella pseudoinfestans L. Lombard & Crous
- Cylindrocladiella pseudoparva L. Lombard & Crous
- Cylindrocladiella qiongensis W.W. Zhou, Ya B. Deng & S.F. Chen bis
- Cylindrocladiella queenslandica L. Lombard & Crous
- Cylindrocladiella reginae L. Lombard & Crous
- Cylindrocladiella siliquiformis W.W. Zhou, Ya B. Deng & S.F. Chen bis
- Cylindrocladiella solicola N.Q. Pham, T.Q. Pham & M.J. Wingf.
- Cylindrocladiella stellenboschensis L. Lombard & Crous
- Cylindrocladiella sylvatica W.W. Zhou & S.F. Chen bis
- Cylindrocladiella temperata W.W. Zhou, Ya B. Deng & S.F. Chen bis
- Cylindrocladiella tenuis Chuan F. Zhang & P.K. Chi
- Cylindrocladiella terrestris L. Lombard & Crous
- Cylindrocladiella thailandica L. Lombard & Crous
- Cylindrocladiella tropicalis W.W. Zhou & S.F. Chen bis
- Cylindrocladiella turangicola W.W. Zhou & S.F. Chen bis
- Cylindrocladiella variabilis L. Lombard & Crous
- Cylindrocladiella viticola Crous & Van Coller
- Cylindrocladiella vitis Crous & Thangavel
- Cylindrocladiella xishuangbannaensis Tibpromma & K.D. Hyde
- Cylindrocladiella xixiensis W.W. Zhou, Ya B. Deng & S.F. Chen bis
- Cylindrocladiella yaluzangbuensis W.W. Zhou & S.F. Chen bis
- Cylindrocladiella yunnanensis Y. Liu & S.F. Chen
