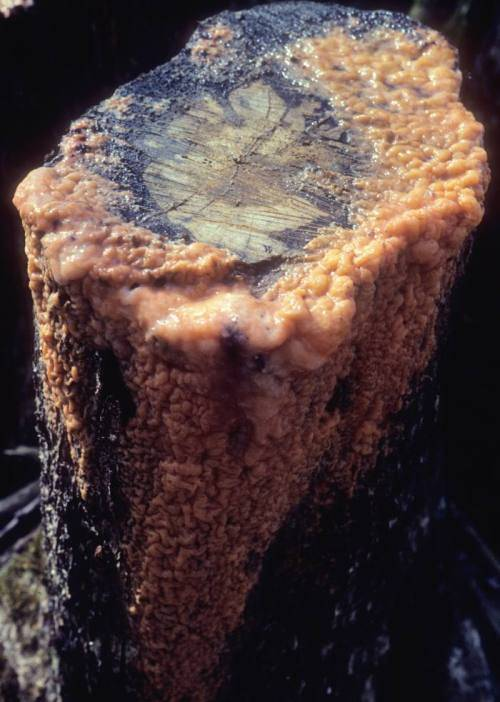
- Fusicolla merismoides

Scientific classification
- Kingdom: Fungi
- Division: Ascomycota
- Class: Sordariomycetes
- Order: Hypocreales
- Family: Nectriaceae
- Genus: Fusicolla; Bonord. (1851)

Type species
- Fusicolla betae Bonord. (1851)

Synonyms
- Fusarium subgen. Leptosporium Sacc. (1886); Leptosporium (Sacc.) Höhn.

= Fusicolla =

Genus of fungi

Fusicolla is a genus of seven species of ascomycete fungi in the family Nectriaceae. The genus was circumscribed by German mycologist Hermann Friedrich Bonorden in 1851. Fungi in the genus produce slimy orange sheets over the substrate, within which the perithecia can be either fully or partially immersed. Asexual spores are similar to those of Fusarium.

== Species ==
- Fusicolla acetilerea
- Fusicolla aquaeductuum
- Fusicolla betae
- Fusicolla epistroma
- Fusicolla matuoi
- Fusicolla merismoides
- Fusicolla violacea
