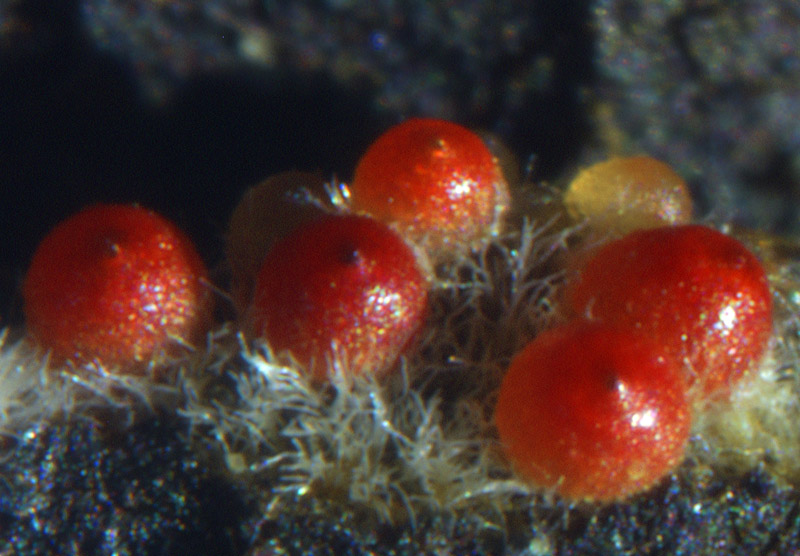
- Perithecia of an unidentified Nectria species

Scientific classification
- Kingdom: Fungi
- Division: Ascomycota
- Class: Sordariomycetes
- Order: Hypocreales
- Family: Nectriaceae
- Genus: Nectria (Fr.) Fr. (1849)

Type species
- Nectria cinnabarina (Tode) Fr. (1849)

Synonyms
- Ephedrosphaera Dumort. (1822); Chilonectria Sacc. (1878); Nectria subgen. Aponectria Sacc. (1878); Megalonectria Speg. (1881); Aponectria (Sacc.) Sacc. (1883); Stilbonectria P.Karst. (1889); Allantonectria Earle (1901); Creonectria Seaver (1909); Rhodothrix Vain. (1921); Styloletendraea Weese (1924); Ochraceospora Fiore (1930)

= Nectria =

Genus of fungi

Nectria is a genus of Ascomycete fungi. They are most often encountered as saprophytes on decaying wood but some species can also occur as parasites of trees, especially fruit trees (for example apple) and a number of other hardwood trees. Some species are significant pests causing diseases such as apple canker, Nectria twig blight, and coral spot in orchards.

It is ubiquitous in cool temperate Europe and North America and appears to be an introduced species in New Zealand and Australia. The occurrence in New Zealand was first identified in 1996 in Otago and Southland although it is believed to have been present since the 1980s. In North America, Nectria infections have had economically important impacts on forestry and forest products including aspen, red oak, maple, beech, poplar, and birch. Species of Nectria also occur in warmer climates including island groups such as Hawaii.

There were around 800 epithets proposed for Nectria sensu lato with 200 estimated species (Booth 1959, Rossman 1999). According to the Dictionary of the Fungi (10th edition, 2008), the genus contains 82 species in 2008. 29 species are accepted by Wijayawardene et al. 2020.

== Selected species ==
- Nectria cinnabarina (Tode) Fr. (1849)
- Nectria coccineonigra Starbäck (1905)
- Nectria discoidea Petch (1920)
- Nectria diversispora Petch (1906)
- Nectria eustromatica Jaklitsch & Voglmayr (2011)
- Nectria foliicola Berk. & M.A. Curtis (1868)
- Nectria fragilis Dingley (1951)
- Nectria frullaniicola Döbbeler (1979)
- Nectria gallifera Pat. (1913)
- Nectria hachijoensis Ts. Watan. (1990)
- Nectria heliconiae E. Müll. (1965)
- Nectria magnispora Hirooka, Rossman & P. Chaverri (2012)
- Nectria masseei Sacc. & D. Sacc. (1905)
- Nectria pertusoides Samuels (1976)
- Nectria pseudotrichia Berk. & M.A. Curtis (1854)
- Nectria pulverulenta Dingley (1956)
- Nectria racovitzae Döbbeler (1978)
- Nectria rehmiana (Kirschst.) Rossman (1983)
