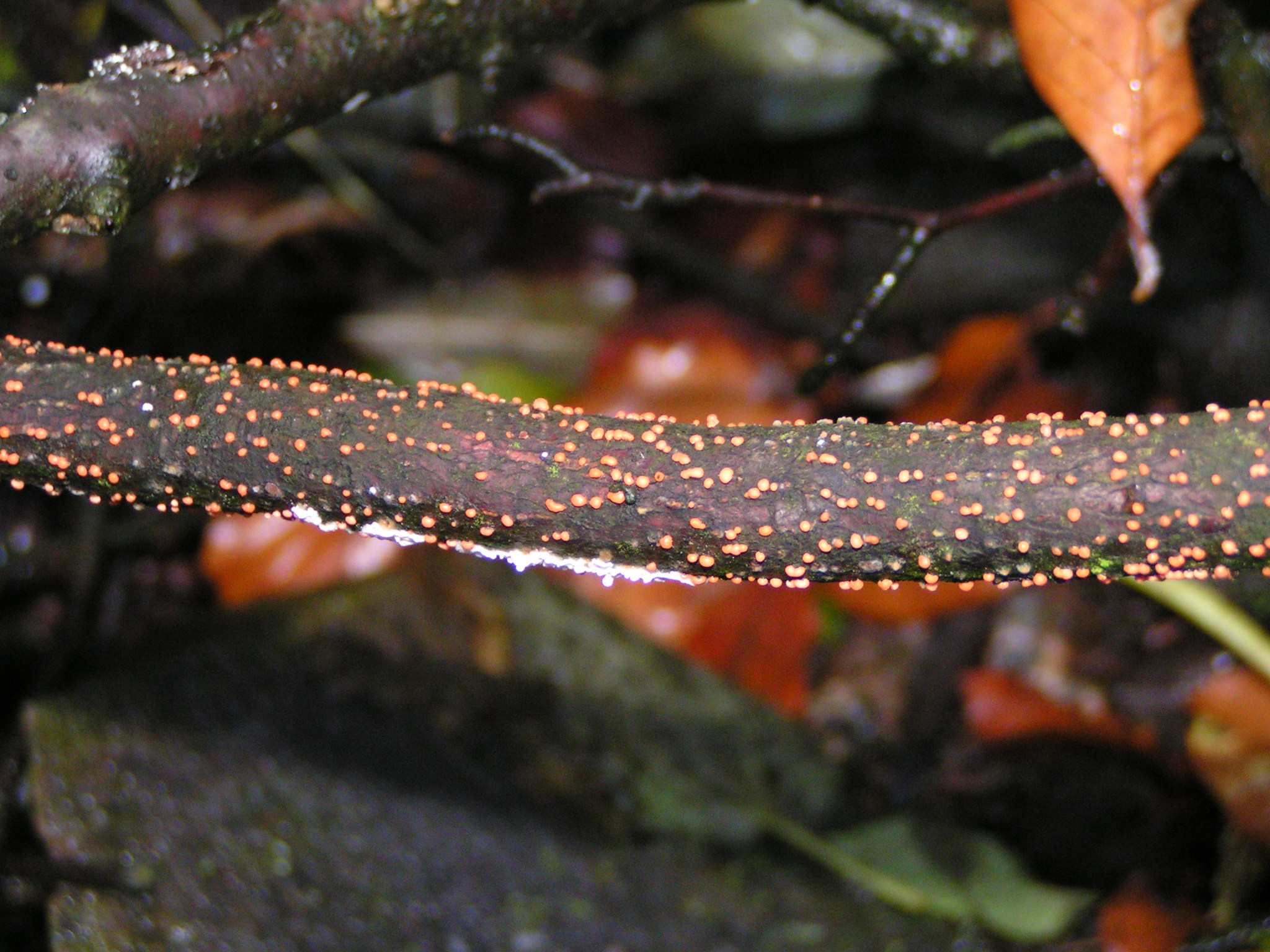
- Nectria cinnabarina

Scientific classification
- Kingdom: Fungi
- Division: Ascomycota
- Class: Sordariomycetes
- Order: Hypocreales
- Family: Nectriaceae; Tul. & C.Tul. (1844)

Type genus
- Nectria (Fr.) Fr. (1849)

Genera
- See text

= Nectriaceae =

Family of fungi

The Nectriaceae are a family of fungi in the order Hypocreales. The group was first circumscribed in 1865 by the French mycologists Charles and Louis Tulasne.

According to a 2020 taxonomic review published in the journal Mycosphere, the family comprised 70 recognized genera and approximately 1,336 species.

It is a highly diverse group with a worldwide distribution and it has higher diversity in warm temperate and tropical regions (Rossman et al. 1999; Rossman 2000; Chaverri et al. 2011, Schroers et al. 2011, Hyde et al. 2014, Lombard et al. 2015,). Several authors have studied and revised the taxonomy of Nectriaceae (Petch 1938; Munk 1957; Dennis 1960; Kreisel 1969; Rossman et al. 1999; Lumbsch and Huhndorf 2010; Lombard et al. 2015; Maharachchikumbura et al. 2016b). A recent treatment of Nectriaceae was provided by Wijayawardene et al. (2022), they also accepted 70 genera within the family.

== List of genera ==
As accepted by Wijayawardene et al. 2020; (with number of species)

- Albonectria Rossman & Samuels (1)
- Allantonectria Earle (1)
- Allonectella Petr. (2)
- Aphanocladium W. Gams (4)
- Aquanectria L. Lombard & Crous (3)
- Atractium Link (3)
- Baipadisphaeria Pinruan (1)
- Bisifusarium L. Lombard, Crous & W. Gams (7)
- Calonectria De Not. (400)
- Calostilbe Sacc. & Syd. (4)
- Campylocarpon Halleen, Schroers & Crous (3)
- Chaetonectrioides Matsush. (1)
- Chaetopsina Rambelli (19)
- Coccinonectria Lombard & Crous (2)
- Corallomycetella Henn. (4)
- Corallonectria C. Herrera & P. Chaverri (1)
- Corinectria C. González & P. Chaverri (3)
- Cosmospora Rabenh. (50)
- Cosmosporella S.K. Huang, R. Jeewon & K.D. Hyde (1)
- Curvicladiella Decock & Crous (1)
- Cyanochyta Höhn. (1)
- Cyanonectria Samuels & Chaverri (2)
- Cyanophomella Höhn. (1)
- Cylindrocladiella Boesew. (45)
- Cylindrodendrum Bonord. (4)
- Dacryoma Samuels (2)
- Dactylonectria L. Lombard & Crous (14)
- Dematiocladium Allegr., Aramb., Cazau & Crous (2)
- Fusarium Link (ca. 120)
- Fusicolla Bonord (18)
- Geejayessia Schroers, Gräfenhan & Seifert (7)
- Gibberella
- Gliocephalotrichum J.J. Ellis & Hesselt. (13)
- Gliocladiopsis S.B. Saksena (15)
- Glionectria Crous & C.L. Schoch (1)
- Haematonectria
- Ilyonectria P. Chaverri & C. Salgado (23)
- Macroconia (Wollenw.) Gräfenhan, Seifert & Schroers (5)
- Mariannaea G. Arnaud ex Samson (22)
- Microcera Desm. (4)
- Murinectria M. Niranjan & V.V. Sarma (4)
- Nalanthamala Subram. (6)
- Nectria (Fr.) Fr. (29)
- Nectricladiella
- Neocalonectria Crous (1)
- Neocosmospora E.F. Sm. (84)
- Neonectria Wollenw. (30)
- Neothyronectria Crous & Thangavel (2)
- Ophionectria Sacc. (39)
- Pandanaceomyces Tibpromma & K.D. Hyde (1)
- Paracremonium L. Lombard & Crous (5)
- Payosphaeria W.F. Leong (1)
- Penicillifer Emden (7)
- Persiciospora P.F. Cannon & D. Hawksw. (4)
- Pleiocarpon L. Lombard & D. Aiello (3)
- Pleogibberella Sacc. (3)
- Pleurocolla Petr. (1)
- Pseudoachroiostachys Tibpromma & K.D. Hyde (1)
- Pseudocosmospora C. Herrera & P. Chaverri (13)
- Pseudonectria Seaver (17)
- Rectifusarium L. Lombard, Crous & W. Gams (2)
- Rubrinectria (Seaver) Rossman & Samuels 1999 (1)
- Rugonectria P. Chaverri & Samuels (5)
- Sarcopodium Ehrenb. (22)
- Stylonectria Höhn. (5)
- Thelonectria P. Chaverri & C.G. Salgado (46)
- Thyronectria Sacc. (41)
- Varicosporella Lechat & J. Fourn. (1)
- Varicosporellopsis Lechat & J. Fourn. (1)
- Volutella Fr. (127)
- Xenoacremonium Lombard & Crous (2)
- Xenocylindrocladium Decock, Hennebert & Crous (3)
- Xenogliocladiopsis Crous & W.B. Kendr. (2)
- Xenoleptographium Marinc., T.A. Duong, Z.W. de Beer & M.J. Wingf. (1)
- XenonectriellaWeese (18)
