= S. phyllostachydis =

S. phyllostachydis may refer to:

- Scolicotrichum phyllostachydis, Teng, a fungus species in the genus Scolicotrichum
- Scyphospora phyllostachydis, a fungus species in the genus Scyphospora
- Shiraiella phyllostachydis (synonyms : Mycocitrus phyllostachydis or Ustilaginoidea phyllostachydis, Syd. 1900), a fungus species in the genus Shiraiella
- Solosympodiella phyllostachydis, Matsush., a fungus species in the genus Solosympodiella
