= Leucosphaera =

Leucosphaera may refer to:

- Leucosphaera (bivalve), a genus of bivalves in the family Lucinidae
- Leucosphaera (plant), a genus of plants in the family Amaranthaceae
- Leucosphaera, a genus of fungi in the family Bionectriaceae, synonym of Leucosphaerina
