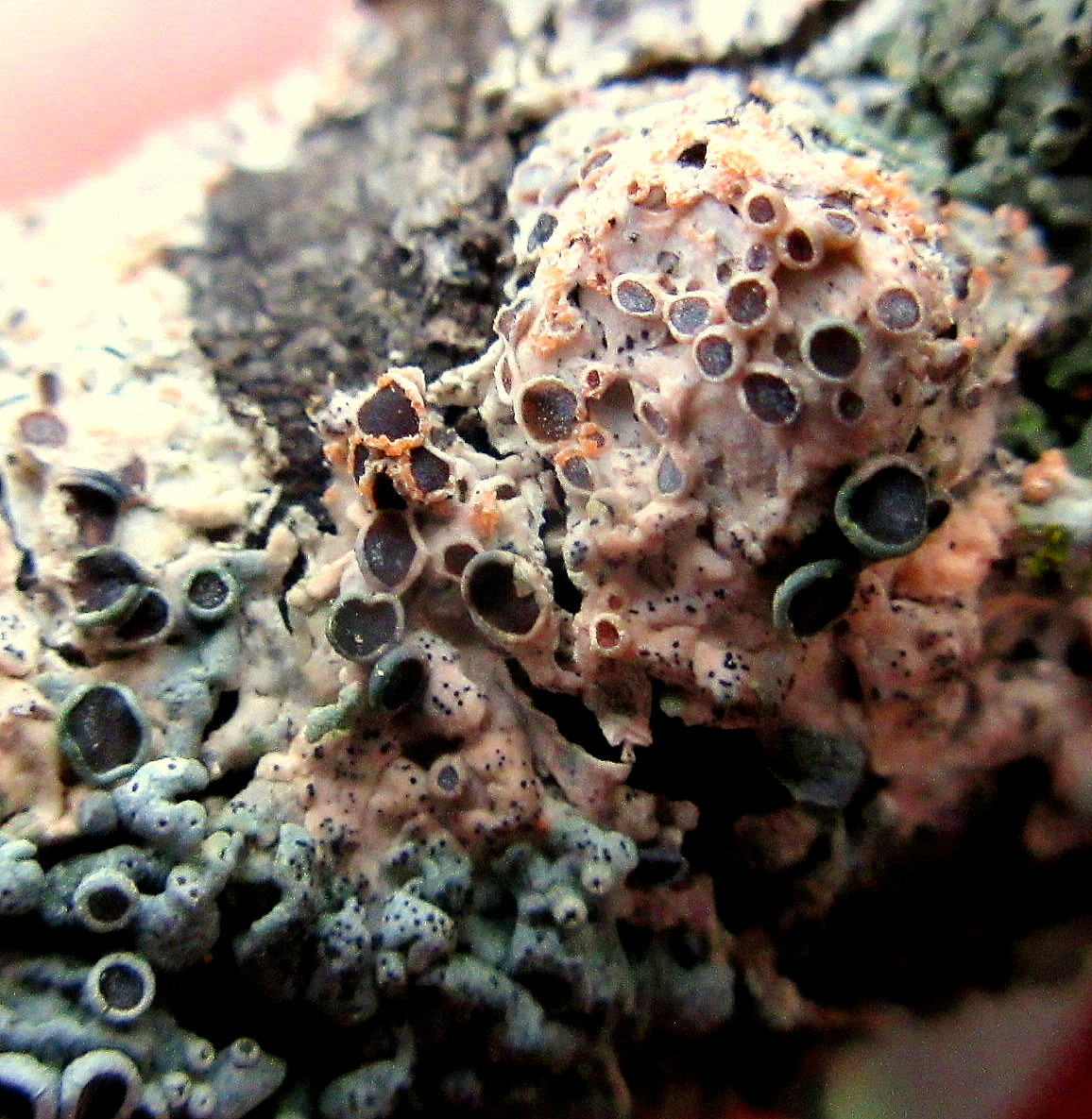
- Ovicuculispora parmeliae (pinkish-orange colour) parasitising a species of Physcia

Scientific classification
- Kingdom: Fungi
- Division: Ascomycota
- Class: Sordariomycetes
- Order: Hypocreales
- Family: Bionectriaceae
- Genus: Ovicuculispora
- Species: O. parmeliae

Binomial name
- Ovicuculispora parmeliae (Berk. & M.A.Curtis) Etayo (2010)

Synonyms
- Diplodia parmeliae Berk. & M.A.Curtis (1874); Diplodina parmeliae (Berk. & M.A.Curtis) Sacc. (1884); Nectria parmeliae (Berk. & M.A.Curtis) D.Hawksw. (1981); Nectriopsis parmeliae (Berk. & M.A.Curtis) M.S.Cole & D.Hawksw. (2001)

= Ovicuculispora parmeliae =

Species of fungus

Ovicuculispora parmeliae is a widely distributed species of lichenicolous fungus in the family Bionectriaceae. It is parasitic on many foliose lichen species, particularly those in the family Parmeliaceae.

== Taxonomy ==
The fungus was first formally described as a new species by mycologists Miles Joseph Berkeley and Moses Ashley Curtis in 1874 as Diplodia parmeliae. It was later placed in the genera Nectria by David L. Hawksworth in 1981, and then Nectriopsis by Mariette Cole and Hawksworth in 2001. In 2010, Javier Etayo circumscribed the new genus Ovicuculispora, and assigned O. parmeliae as the type species.
