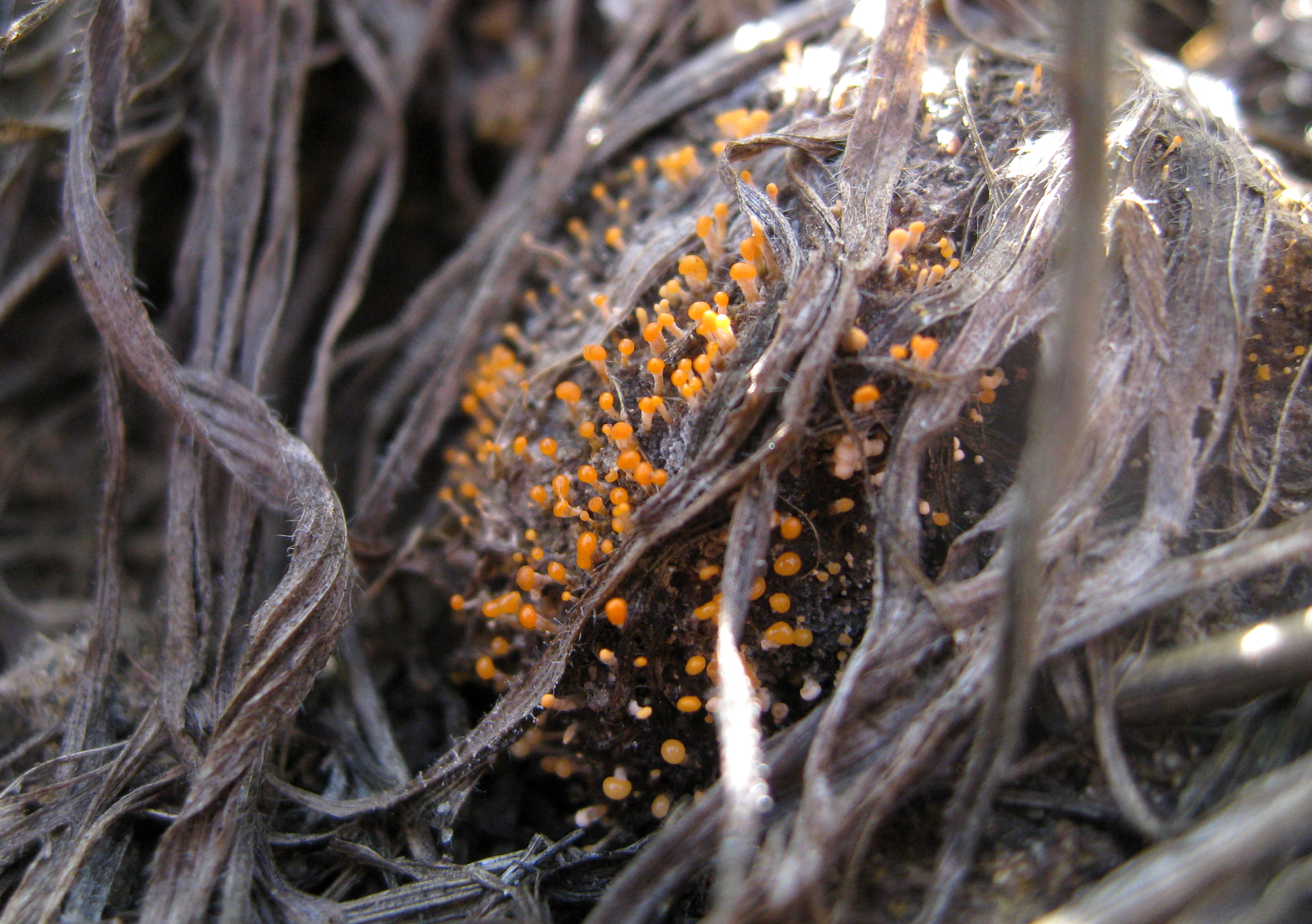
- Stilbella fimetaria

Scientific classification
- Kingdom: Fungi
- Division: Ascomycota
- Class: Sordariomycetes
- Order: Hypocreales
- Genus: Stilbella; Lindau (1900)

Type species
- Stilbella erythrocephala (Ditmar) Lindau (1900)

= Stilbella =

Genus of fungi

Stilbella is a genus of fungi in the order Hypocreales. The relationship of this taxon to other taxa within the order is unknown (incertae sedis), and it has not yet been placed with certainty into any family. It is sometimes placed in the family Bionectriaceae (order Hypocreales).

A 1985 monograph included 19 species; more recent estimates place about 60 species in the genus. The type species Stilbella fimetaria (Pers.) Lindau 1905 (syn. Stilbella erythrocephala (Ditmar) Lindau 1900) has a cosmopolitan distribution and grows on herbivore dung. It has pink or orange slimy conidia on white synnemata with phialidic conidiogenous cells. Several species have since been reclassified in other genera based on molecular phylogenetics or the discovery of sexual states, such as Atractium, Stilbocrea, and Trichoderma.

== Species ==
As of November 2022, Species Fungorum (in the Catalogue of Life) accepts 60 species of Stilbella.

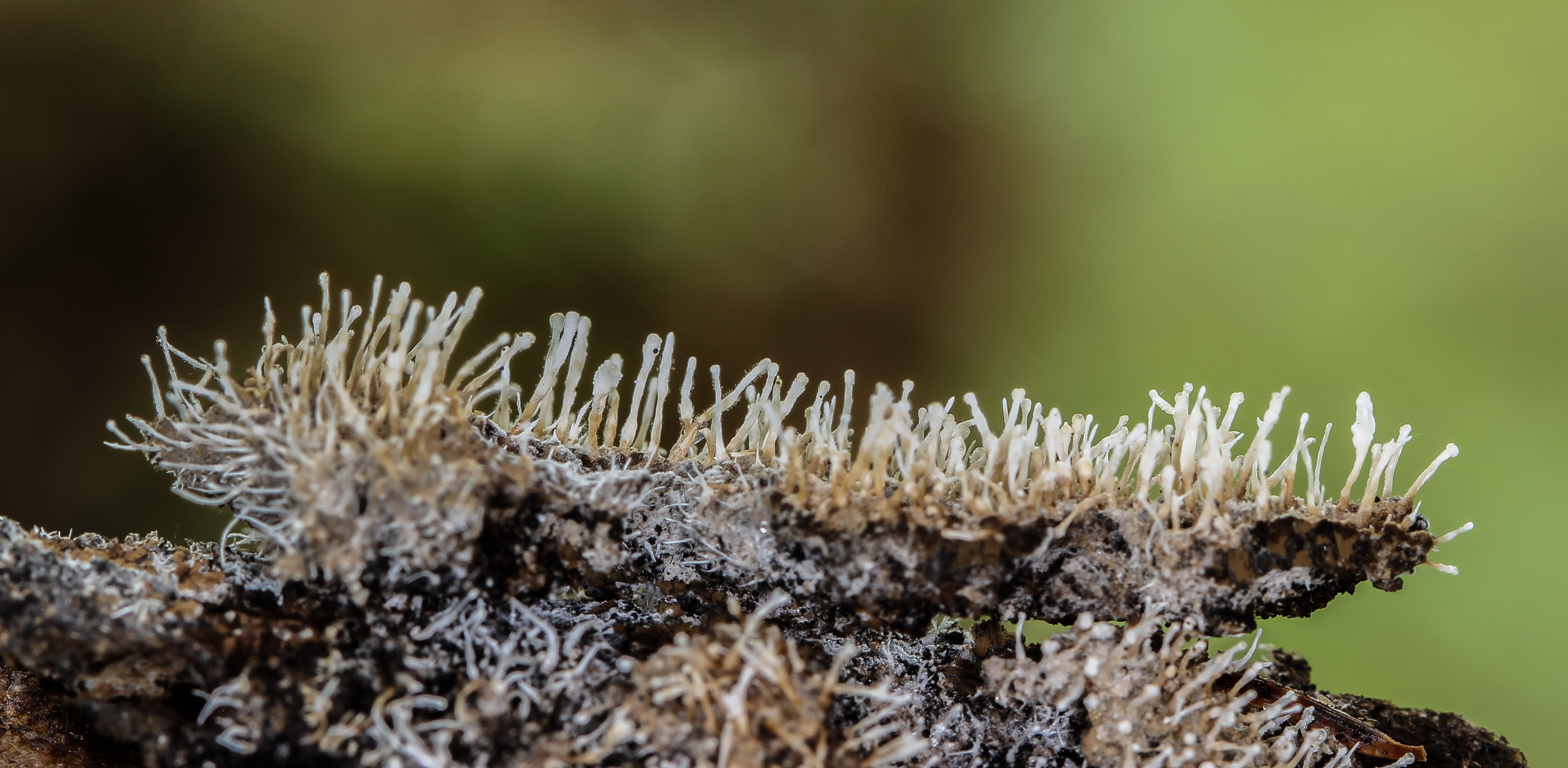
Stilbella byssiseda

- Stilbella aciculosa (Ellis & Everh.) Seifert (1985)
- Stilbella albocitrina (Ellis & Everh.) Seifert (1985)
- Stilbella albominuta Seifert (1985)
- Stilbella aleuriata (Berk. & M.A.Curtis) Seifert (1985)
- Stilbella aquigena (Rebent.) Lindau (1908)
- Stilbella arndtii Lingelsh. (1921)
- Stilbella aurantiocinnabarina (Speg.) Herter (1933)
- Stilbella aureola (Sacc.) Lindau (1908)
- Stilbella berteroi (Lév.) J.A.Stev. (1975)
- Stilbella bucidae R.F.Castañeda & W.B.Kendr. (1991)
- Stilbella bulbicola Henn. (1905)
- Stilbella byssiseda (Pers.) Seifert (1985)
- Stilbella bulbosa (Tode) Lindau (1900)
- Stilbella clavispora Seifert (1985)
- Stilbella burmensis (Mains) Samson & H.C.Evans (1981)
- Stilbella byssiseda (Pers.) Seifert (1985)
- Stilbella candidula (Penz. & Sacc.) Overeem & D.Overeem (1922)
- Stilbella capillamentosa (Preuss) Lindau (1908)
- Stilbella cinerea Torrend (1914)
- Stilbella clavispora Seifert (1985)
- Stilbella clavulata Overeem & D.Overeem (1922)
- Stilbella clavulata Overeem & D.Overeem (1922)
- Stilbella coccophila (Sacc.) Ferraris (1910)
- Stilbella emericellopsis Seifert (1985)
- Stilbella dielsiana Reichert (1921)
- Stilbella dolichoderinarum Samson & H.C.Evans (1981)
- Stilbella ecuadorensis Morgan-Jones & McKemy (1991)
- Stilbella eichlerae Brackel (2019)
- Stilbella elasticae Koord. (1907)
- Stilbella emericellopsis Seifert (1985)
- Stilbella fimetaria (Pers.) Lindau (1905)
- Stilbella flavoviridis (Fuckel) Höhn. (1908)
- Stilbella fusca (Sacc.) Seifert (1985)
- Stilbella herbarum (Rabenh.) Lindau (1908)
- Stilbella heveae Zimm. (1902)
- Stilbella hirsuta Lindau (1900)
- Stilbella hyalina (Alb. & Schwein.) Lindau (1908)
- Stilbella iwokramensis J.F.Bisch. (2005)
- Stilbella jaapii Matsush. (1975)
- Stilbella karstenii (Sacc.) J.A.Stev. (1975)
- Stilbella minutissima (Speg.) Seifert (1985)
- Stilbella larvarum Kobayasi (1941)
- Stilbella sebacea (Ellis & Everh.) Seifert (1985)
- Stilbella ledermannii Syd. & P.Syd. (1916)
- Stilbella stereicola Seifert (1985)
- Stilbella lutea (Pers.) Lindau (1908)
- Stilbella maxima Eichelb. (1906)
- Stilbella melastomataceae Henn. (1908)
- Stilbella mesenterica Henn. (1902)
- Stilbella minutissima (Speg.) Seifert (1985)
- Stilbella pellucidum (Schrad.) Lindau (1908)
- Stilbella pezizoidea Henn. (1908)
- Stilbella proliferans F.Stevens (1927)
- Stilbella pseudomortierella Danysz & Wize (1903)
- Stilbella pubida (Tode) Lindau (1908)
- Stilbella resinae (Bres. & Sacc.) Lindau (1908)
- Stilbella rosea (Schwein.) Ferraris (1910)
- Stilbella rubescens Syd. & P.Syd. (1901)
- Stilbella rubicunda (Tode) Lindau (1908)
- Stilbella sanguinea Lindau (1908)
- Stilbella sebacea (Ellis & Everh.) Seifert (1985)
- Stilbella setiformis (Vahl) Petch (1933)
- Stilbella stereicola Seifert (1985)
- Stilbella subinconspicua (Corda) Lindau (1908)
- Stilbella theae C.Bernard (1907)
- Stilbella xanthopus (Rabenh.) Lindau (1908)
