= Murorum =

Murorum may refer to:

- Botryotrichum murorum, species of fungus
- Gliomastix murorum, species of fungus
- Hieracium murorum, species of flowering plant
- Pleopeltis murorum, species of fern
- Senecio murorum, species of flowering plant
