= Clonostachys =

Clonostachys may refer to:

- Clonostachys Klotzsch, 1841, a genus of plants in synonymy with Sebastiania
- Clonostachys Corda, 1839, a genus of fungi including Clonostachys rosea f. rosea
