= Selinia =

Selinia may refer to:

- Selinia, Greece, a resort town on Salamis Island
- Selinia (fungus)
