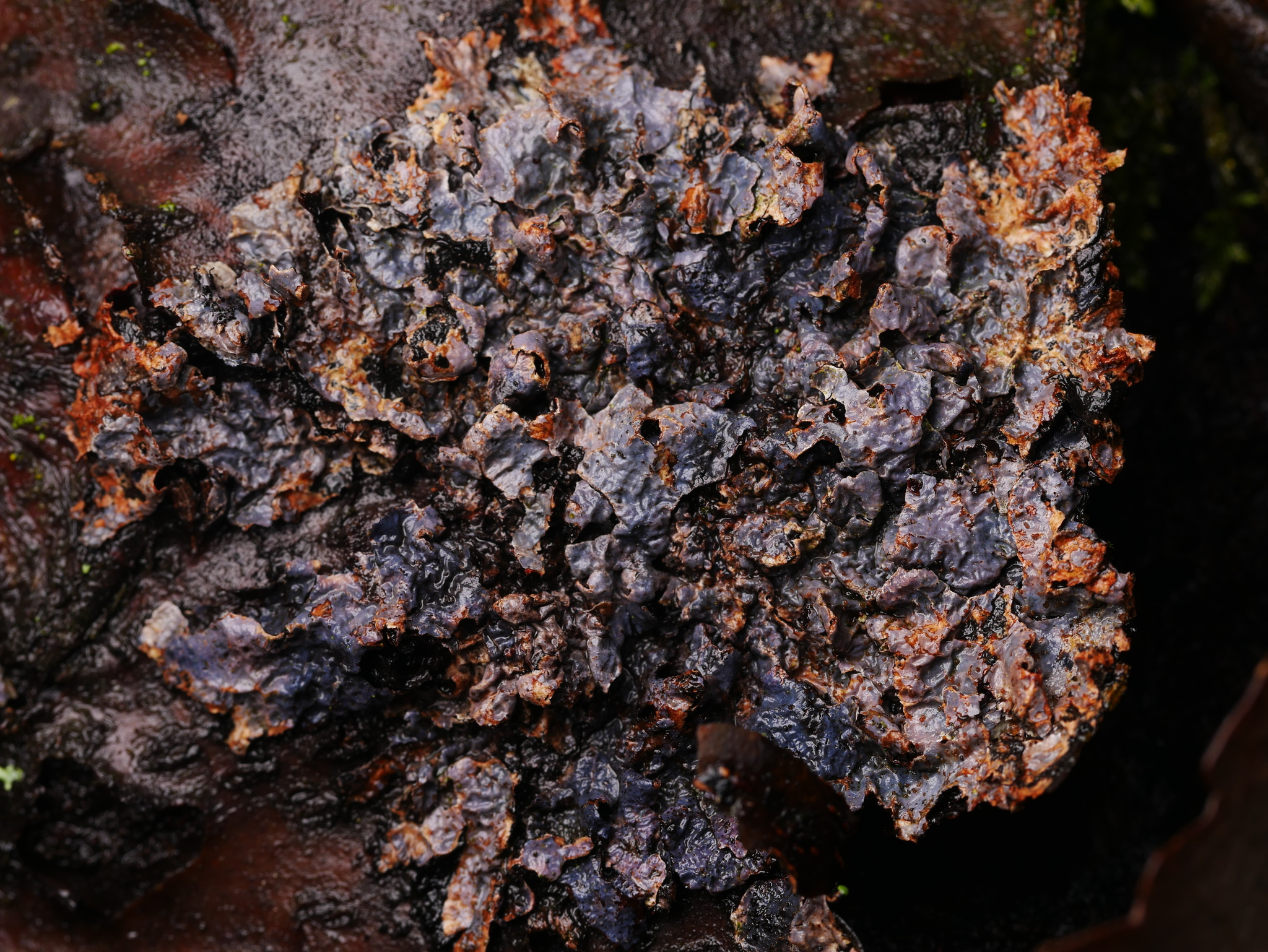
- Nectriopsis rubefaciens

Scientific classification
- Kingdom: Fungi
- Division: Ascomycota
- Class: Sordariomycetes
- Order: Hypocreales
- Family: Bionectriaceae
- Genus: Nectriopsis
- Species: N. rubefaciens

Binomial name
- Nectriopsis rubefaciens (Ellis & Everh.) M.S. Cole & D. Hawksw.

= Nectriopsis rubefaciens =

Species of Fungus

Nectriopsis rubefaciens is an orange-red lichenicolous fungus, a host-specific parasitic fungus that lives on lichen. It has globose reddish-brown perithecia (80–160 μm in diameter) with scattered gland-like hairs of a fine cellular texture. Paraphyses are absent and the hyaline ascospores are oblong-cylindrical, 8/ascus.

== Habitat ==
Nectriopsis rubefaciens is found on crustose and foliose lichens in damp forests. Trichonectria rubefaciens has been known to grow on lichens in the family Parmeliaceae, and Aspicilia species.

== Distribution ==
Nectriopsis rubefaciens has been found growing in North America in North Carolina and in coastal and mountainous regions. It has also been found in Östergötland and Närke in Sweden.
