= Gliomastix murorum =

Scientific classification
- Domain: Eukaryota
- Kingdom: Fungi
- Division: Ascomycota
- Class: Sordariomycetes
- Order: Hypocreales
- Family: Bionectriaceae
- Genus: Gliomastix
- Species: G. murorum

Binomial name
- Gliomastix murorum (Corda) S. Hughes (1958)

Synonyms
- Acremonium murorum (corda) W. Grams (1971); Torura cephalosporioides J.F.H. Beyma (1937); Graphium malorum Kidd & Beaumont (1924); Torula convoluta Harz (1871); Torula chartarum Corda Corda (1840)

Species of fungus

Gliomastix murorum is one of four species of fungus in the genus Gliomastix. G. murorum is a type of saprophyte. One of the techniques that is used to isolate this fungus is through dilution plate.

== History and taxonomy ==
In the past, there have been some confusions regarding which genus G. murorum should be part of. Over the years, Names of G. murorum have changed numerous times. In 1905, in order to accommodate species, Torula chartarum Corda, Gueguen erected form-genus Gliomastix. At first, G. chartarum and T. chartarum, a same fungus as T. convoluta, were thought to be two different fungi. However, Mason concluded G. chartarum is synonymous to G. convoluta, which is the same fungus as the T. convoluta. and Hughes and Dickinson eventually listed all of them as a species called G. murorum and listed them to be synonymous to one another. The proposal stating Gliomastix is the same genus as Acremonium was not accepted. Also, placing G. murorum into form-genus Sagrahamala was not accepted.

== Growth and morphology ==
At first, colonies of G. murorum are white/pale pink and as conidia matures, colonies start to become black. Conidia can grow to the size of 2.5–5.5μm X 2–4.5μm. and, due to granules, is rough. Conidia grow in chains from phialides and mycelial rope is where phialides arise. Although the base of phialides, which is about 2–3 μm thick, is smooth, the apex part, which is about 1μ thick, of the phialides is roughened with granules. At the apex site, there is collaratte. Overall, the length of phialides of G. murorum are about 20–30μ long. G. murorum is known to grow slowly.

== Physiology ==
Gliomastix murorum does not favour one type of soil over another, and is capable of living almost anywhere. However, the fungus prefers soil with the fertilizer in the following order, NPK, PK, and NK, NPK being the most preferred and NK being the least preferred fertilizer. It grows best in water potential of 2.3 bar but it was able to survive even when it went over 9 bars. Its cellulase activity works best at pH 9 and at temperature of 29 °C, it loses its activity starting at 35 °C. G. murorum is tolerant of up to 10% of CO_{2}. Although it can grow well when there is only N_{2}, it is not tolerant of CS_{2} treatment. It has been reported, in 1967 that G. convolute (=G. murorum) is chitinolytic. It also has been found that since fungi in genus Gliomastix, including G. murorum, has cellulase activity, they can result in deterioration of manufactured materials, such as paper and sacking.

== Habitat and ecology ==
Gliomastix murorum does not grow on acid peats. Other than acid peats, there seems to be no particular place where G. murorum prefers to grow. The fungus is found in all different types of soil. It is commonly found on decaying plants and throughout the world, including both temperate zone and tropical zones. It is relatively common compared to other fungi species that are part of form-genus Gliomastix. other form-genus Gliomasix are typically spotted in tropical regions. While G. muroum is found commonly in countries, like New Zealand and Europe, it is found less in North America. It also could be isolated from places, like wood and textiles.

== Commercial use ==
Research conducted on G. murorum showed that two metabolites, ergosta-5,7,22-trien-3-ol and 2,3-dihydro-5-hydroxy-α,α-dimethyl-2-benzofuranmethanol, that were extracted from G. murorum have antimicrobial activity. Another research showed that volatile oils from G. murorum also have antimicrobial activity The two experiments conducted on G. murorum suggest that metabolites and volatile oil that are extracted from G. murorum could possibly be utilized as an antimicrobial agent. Alpha-mannosidase, which could be extracted from G. murorum, is known for its high enzymatic activity and it is commonly used in industries because using this glycosidase is the cheapest way to make oligosaccharides Despite alpha-mannosidase being widely used in industries, like food and drug industries, there has been no specific research on the toxicity of alpha mannosidase. Crude enzyme extracted showed negative effects on some organ systems of the Swiss Albino mice.
