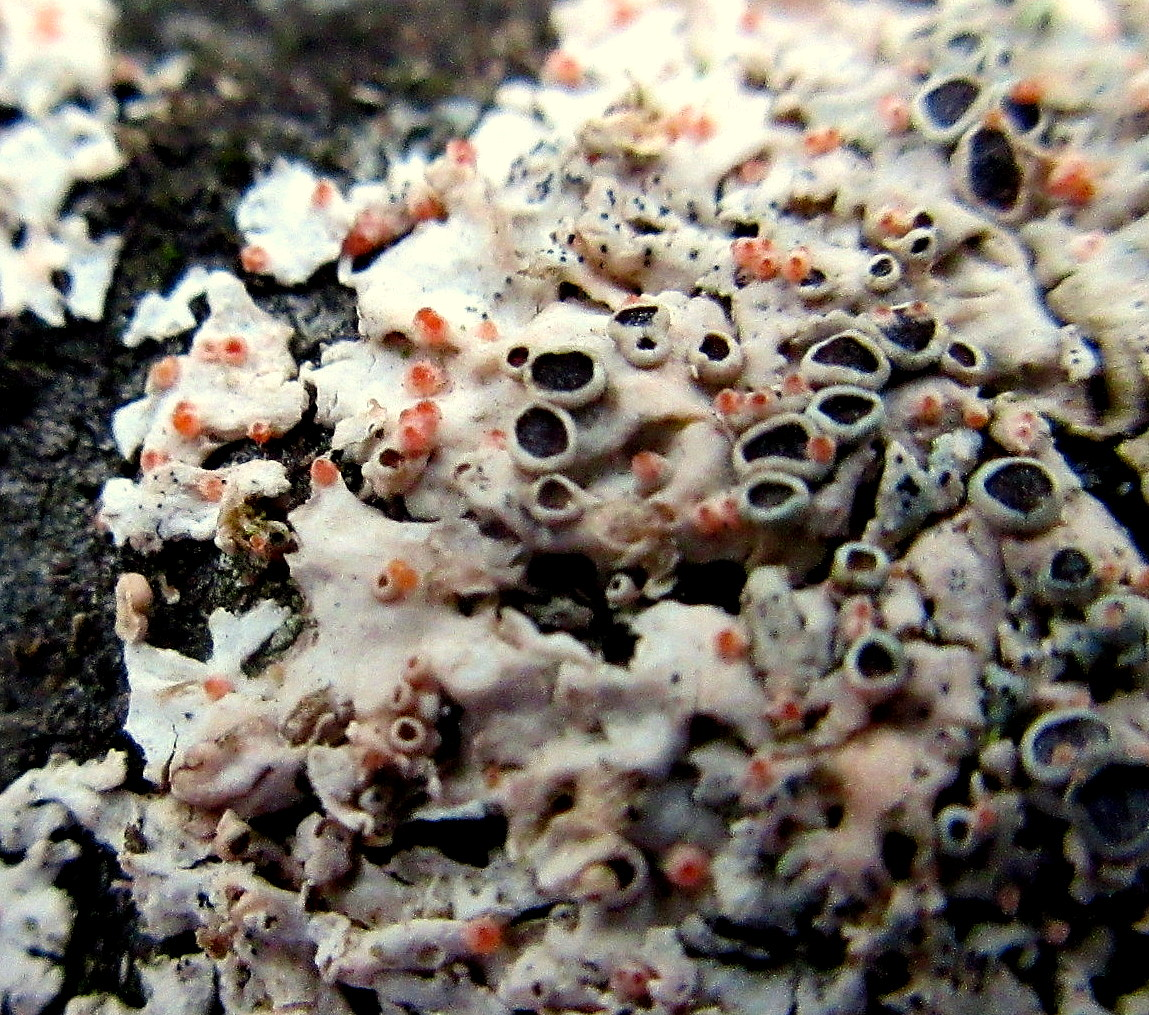
- Ovicuculispora parmeliae (pinkish-orange) growing on a species of Physcia

Scientific classification
- Domain: Eukaryota
- Kingdom: Fungi
- Division: Ascomycota
- Class: Sordariomycetes
- Order: Hypocreales
- Family: Bionectriaceae
- Genus: Ovicuculispora; Etayo (2010)

Type species
- Ovicuculispora parmeliae (Berk. & M.A.Curtis) Etayo (2010)

Species
- O. macrospora O. parmeliae

= Ovicuculispora =

Genus of fungi

Ovicuculispora is a genus of lichenicolous fungi in the family Bionectriaceae. The genus was circumscribed by Javier Etayo in 2010, with O. parmeliae assigned as the type species. This species had formerly been placed in the genera Nectria in 1981, and later (2001) in Nectriopsis.
