= P. vulgare =

P. vulgare may refer to:

- Polypodium vulgare, the common polypody, a fern species
- Polystigma vulgare, a synonym for Bionectria ochroleuca

== See also ==
- Vulgare
