= H. phyllostachydis =

H. phyllostachydis may refer to:

- Hypocrea phyllostachydis, a fungus species of the genus Hypocrea
- Hypocreopsis phyllostachydis, a fungus species
