= Gymnopilus aculeatus =

Scientific classification
- Kingdom: Fungi
- Division: Basidiomycota
- Class: Agaricomycetes
- Order: Agaricales
- Family: Hymenogastraceae
- Genus: Gymnopilus
- Species: G. aculeatus

Binomial name
- Gymnopilus aculeatus (Bres. & Roum.) Singer (1951)

Synonyms
- Pholiota aculeata Bres. & Roum. (1890)

Species of fungus

Gymnopilus aculeatus Mycological characteristics
- Gills on hymenium
- Cap is convex
- Hymenium is adnexed or adnate
- Ecology is saprotrophic

Gymnopilus aculeatus is a species of mushroom-forming fungus in the family Hymenogastraceae. Originally described in 1890 as a species of Pholiota, it was transferred to genus Gymnopilus by mycologist Rolf Singer in 1951.

== See also ==
- List of Gymnopilus species
