= Bryonectria =

Scientific classification
- Kingdom: Fungi
- Division: Ascomycota
- Class: Sordariomycetes
- Order: Hypocreales
- Family: Bionectriaceae
- Genus: Bryonectria; Döbbeler (1998)

Type species
- Bryonectria hylocomii (Döbbeler) Döbbeler (1998)

Genus of fungi

Bryonectria is a genus of fungi in the class Sordariomycetes.
