= Mycoarachis =

Scientific classification
- Kingdom: Fungi
- Division: Ascomycota
- Class: Sordariomycetes
- Order: Hypocreales
- Family: Bionectriaceae
- Genus: Mycoarachis; Malloch & Cain (1970)

Type species
- Mycoarachis inversa Malloch & Cain (1970)

Species
- M. inversa M. tetraspora

Genus of fungi

Mycoarachis is a genus of fungi in the class Sordariomycetes.
