= Dimerosporiella =

Scientific classification
- Domain: Eukaryota
- Kingdom: Fungi
- Division: Ascomycota
- Class: Sordariomycetes
- Order: Hypocreales
- Family: Bionectriaceae
- Genus: Dimerosporiella; Speg. (1908)

Type species
- Dimerosporiella paulistana Speg. (1908)

Genus of fungi

Dimerosporiella is a genus of fungi in the class Sordariomycetes.

== Species ==
As accepted by Species Fungorum;

- Dimerosporiella cephalosporii (Hansf.) Rossman & Samuels (1999)
- Dimerosporiella guarapiensis (Speg.) Rossman & Samuels (1999)
- Dimerosporiella leucorrhodina (Mont.) Rossman & Samuels (1999)
- Dimerosporiella oidioides (Speg.) Rossman & Samuels (1999)
- Dimerosporiella paulistana Speg. (1908)
- Dimerosporiella pipericola (Henn.) Rossman & Samuels (1999)
- Dimerosporiella sensitiva (Rehm) Rossman & Samuels (1999)

Former species; D. amomi (Berk. & Broome) Höhn. (1909) = Dysrhynchis amomi, Dysrhynchaceae
