= Clibanites =

Scientific classification
- Kingdom: Fungi
- Division: Ascomycota
- Class: Sordariomycetes
- Order: Hypocreales
- Family: Bionectriaceae
- Genus: Clibanites; P. Karst.

Type species
- Clibanites paradoxa (P. Karst.) P. Karst.

Genus of fungi

Clibanites is a genus of fungi in the class Sordariomycetes. This is a monotypic genus, containing the single species Clibanites paradoxa.
