= Stephanonectria =

Scientific classification
- Kingdom: Fungi
- Division: Ascomycota
- Class: Sordariomycetes
- Order: Hypocreales
- Family: Bionectriaceae
- Genus: Stephanonectria; Schroers & Samuels (1999)

Type species
- Stephanonectria keithii (Berk. & Broome) Schroers & Samuels (1999)

Genus of fungi

Stephanonectria is a genus of fungi in the class Sordariomycetes. This was a monotypic genus, containing the single species Stephanonectria keithii until another species was added in 2023.

== Species ==
As accepted by Species Fungorum;

- Stephanonectria chromolaenae R.H. Perera & K.D. Hyde (2023
- Stephanonectria keithii (Berk. & Broome) Schroers & Samuels (1999)
