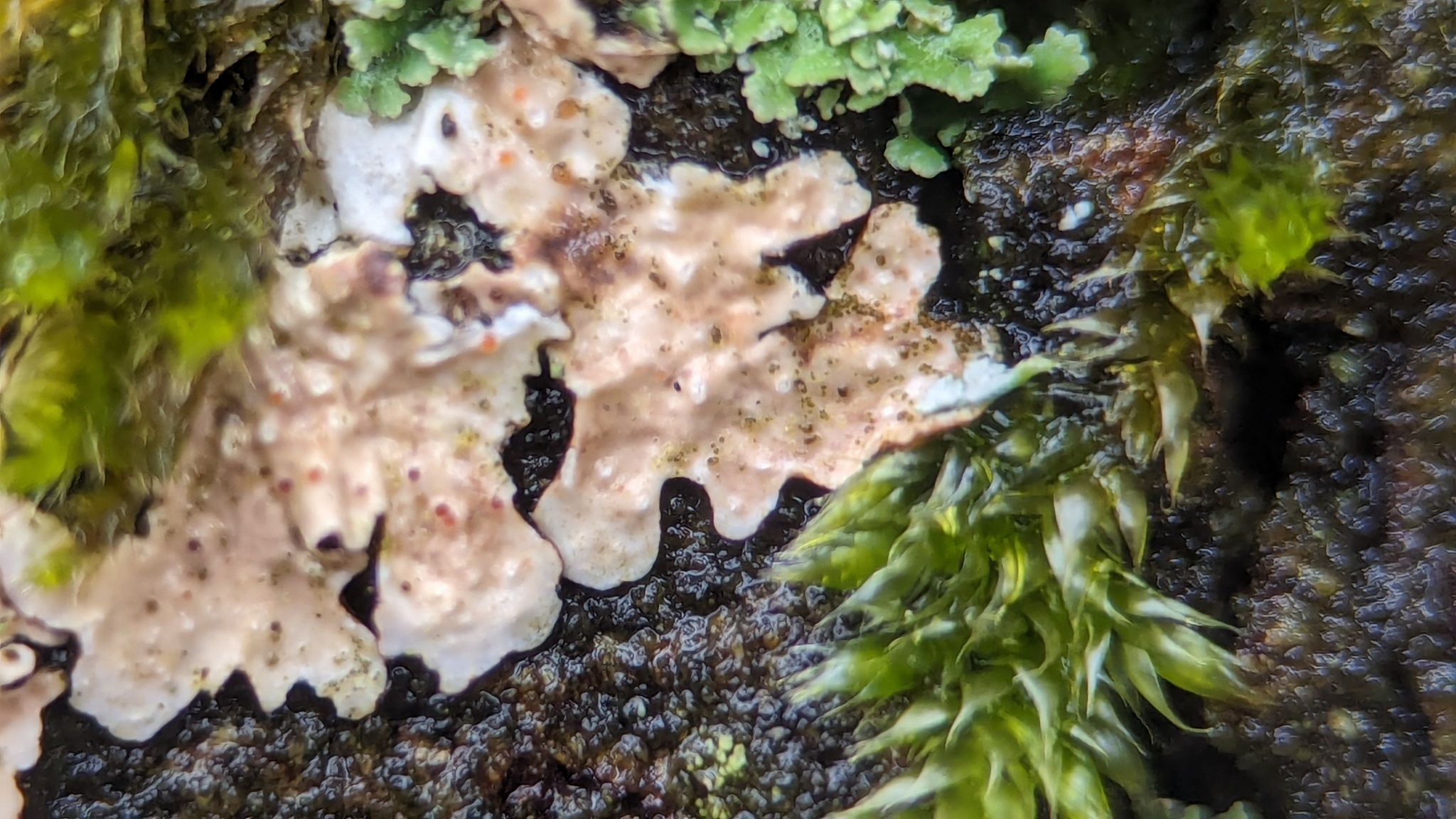
- Pronectria oligospora

Scientific classification
- Kingdom: Fungi
- Division: Ascomycota
- Class: Sordariomycetes
- Order: Hypocreales
- Family: Bionectriaceae
- Genus: Pronectria; Clem. (1931)

Type species
- Pronectria lichenicola (Ces.) Clem. (1931)

= Pronectria =

Genus of fungi

Pronectria is a genus of fungi in the family Bionectriaceae. It consists of 44 species, all of which are lichenicolous. The genus was circumscribed by American plant ecologist Frederic Clements in 1931.

== Species ==
- Pronectria algicola Vondráková, A.Naumovich & Khodos. (2012)
- Pronectria angulospora Etayo (1998)
- Pronectria anisospora (Lowen) Lowen (1990)
- Pronectria biglobosa Etayo (2017)
- Pronectria caloplacae Khodos., Vondrák & Naumovich (2012)
- Pronectria casaresii Etayo (1998)
- Pronectria collematis Etayo & Brackel (2010)
- Pronectria dillmaniae Zhurb. (2005)
- Pronectria diplococca Kocourk., Khodos., Naumovich, Vondrák & Motiej. (2012)
- Pronectria echinulata Lowen (1999)
- Pronectria erythrinella (Nyl.) Lowen (1990)
- Pronectria fragmospora Etayo (2008)
- Pronectria hymeniicola Etayo (2010)
- Pronectria invisibilis Etayo (2008)
- Pronectria japonica Zhurb., Tadome & Y.Ohmura (2018)
- Pronectria lecideicola Zhurb. (2009)
- Pronectria leptaleae (J.Steiner) Lowen (1990)
- Pronectria leptogii Etayo (2002)
- Pronectria lichenicola (Ces.) Clem. (1931)
- Pronectria microspora Etayo (2002)
- Pronectria minuta Motiej. & Kukwa (2008)
- Pronectria neofissuriprodiens F.Berger & E.Zimm. (2016)
- Pronectria occulta Etayo (2008)
- Pronectria oligospora Lowen & Rogerson (1995)
- Pronectria parmotrematis Etayo (2001)
- Pronectria pedemontana Brackel (2013)
- Pronectria pertusariicola Lowen (1999)
- Pronectria pilosa Etayo & López de Silanes (2009)
- Pronectria pycnidioidea Etayo (2017)
- Pronectria rhizocarpicola Brackel (2013)
- Pronectria robergei (Mont. & Desm.) Lowen (1990)
- Pronectria rolfiana Etayo (2010)
- Pronectria roseopunctata Etayo (2002)
- Pronectria santessonii (Lowen & D.Hawksw.) Lowen (1990)
- Pronectria sticticola Etayo (2002)
- Pronectria tenacis (Vouaux) Lowen (1990)
- Pronectria tenuispora (D.Hawksw.) Lowen (1990)
- Pronectria terrestris Lowen & Diederich (1990)
- Pronectria tibellii Zhurb. (2004)
- Pronectria tincta (Fuckel) Lowen (1990)
- Pronectria toniniae Etayo (2010)
- Pronectria verrucariae (Vouaux) Lowen (1990)
- Pronectria walkerorum Zhurb. (2005)
- Pronectria xanthoriae Lowen & Diederich (1990)
- Pronectria zhurbenkoi Brackel (2015)
