= Ochronectria =

Scientific classification
- Kingdom: Fungi
- Division: Ascomycota
- Class: Sordariomycetes
- Order: Hypocreales
- Family: Bionectriaceae
- Genus: Ochronectria; Rossman & Samuels (1999)

Type species
- Ochronectria calami (Henn. & E.Nyman) Rossman & Samuels (1999)

Genus of fungi

Ochronectria is a genus of fungi in the class Sordariomycetes.
