= Clonostachys rosea f. rosea =

Scientific classification
- Domain: Eukaryota
- Kingdom: Fungi
- Division: Ascomycota
- Class: Sordariomycetes
- Order: Hypocreales
- Family: Bionectriaceae
- Genus: Clonostachys
- Species: C. rosea
- Forma: C. r. f. rosea

Trionomial name
- Clonostachys rosea f. rosea (Link) Schroers (1999)

Synonyms
- Clonostachys araucaria Clonostachys araucaria var. confusa Clonostachys rosea Gliocladium aureum Gliocladium roseum Haplotrichum roseum Penicillium roseum

Fungus taxon

Clonostachys rosea f. rosea, also known as Gliocladium roseum and commonly called the rose bracket, is a species of fungus in the family Bionectriaceae. It colonizes living plants as an endophyte, digests material in soil as a saprophyte and is also known as a parasite of other fungi and of nematodes. It produces a wide range of volatile organic compounds which are toxic to organisms including other fungi, bacteria, and insects, and is of interest as a biological pest control agent.

== Biological control ==
Clonostachys rosea protects plants against Botrytis cinerea ("grey mold") by suppressing spore production. Its hyphae have been found to coil around, penetrate, and grow inside the hyphae and conidia of B. cinerea.

Nematodes are infected by C. rosea when the fungus' conidia attach to their cuticle and germinate, going on to produce germ tubes which penetrate the host's body and kill it.

== Biofuels ==
In 2008 an isolate of Clonostachys rosea (NRRL 50072) was identified as producing a series of volatile compounds that are similar to some existing fuels, including diesel. However, the taxonomy of this isolate was later revised to Ascocoryne sarcoides.

== See also ==
- Entomopathogenic fungus
