= Kallichroma =

Scientific classification
- Domain: Eukaryota
- Kingdom: Fungi
- Division: Ascomycota
- Class: Sordariomycetes
- Order: Hypocreales
- Family: Bionectriaceae
- Genus: Kallichroma; Kohlm. & Volkm.-Kohlm. (1993)

Type species
- Kallichroma tethys (Kohlm. & Kohlm.) Kohlm. & Volkm.-Kohlm. (1993)

Genus of fungi

Kallichroma is a genus of fungi in the class Sordariomycetes which consisted of two species in 2008. In 2023, it contained 4 species.

It was placed in family Ijuhyaceae before being placed in family Bionectriaceae.

== Species ==
As accepted by Species Fungorum;

- Kallichroma asperum Abdel-Wahab, Bahkali & E.B.G. Jones (2016)
- Kallichroma ellipsoideum Abdel-Wahab, Bahkali & E.B.G. Jones (2016)
- Kallichroma glabrum (Kohlm.) Kohlm. & Volkm.-Kohlm. (1993)
- Kallichroma tethys (Kohlm. & E. Kohlm.) Kohlm. & Volkm.-Kohlm. (1993)
