= Mycocitrus =

Scientific classification
- Kingdom: Fungi
- Division: Ascomycota
- Class: Sordariomycetes
- Order: Hypocreales
- Family: Bionectriaceae
- Genus: Mycocitrus; Möller (1901)

Type species
- Mycocitrus aurantium Möller (1901)

Genus of fungi

Mycocitrus is a genus of fungi in the family Bionectriaceae.

== Species ==
As accepted by Species Fungorum;

- Mycocitrus aurantium Möller (1901)
- Mycocitrus phyllostachydis (Syd. & P. Syd.) Yoshim. Doi (1967)

Former species; M. hypocrellicola (Henn.) Höhn. (1910) = Nectriopsis hypocrellicola, Bionectriaceae
