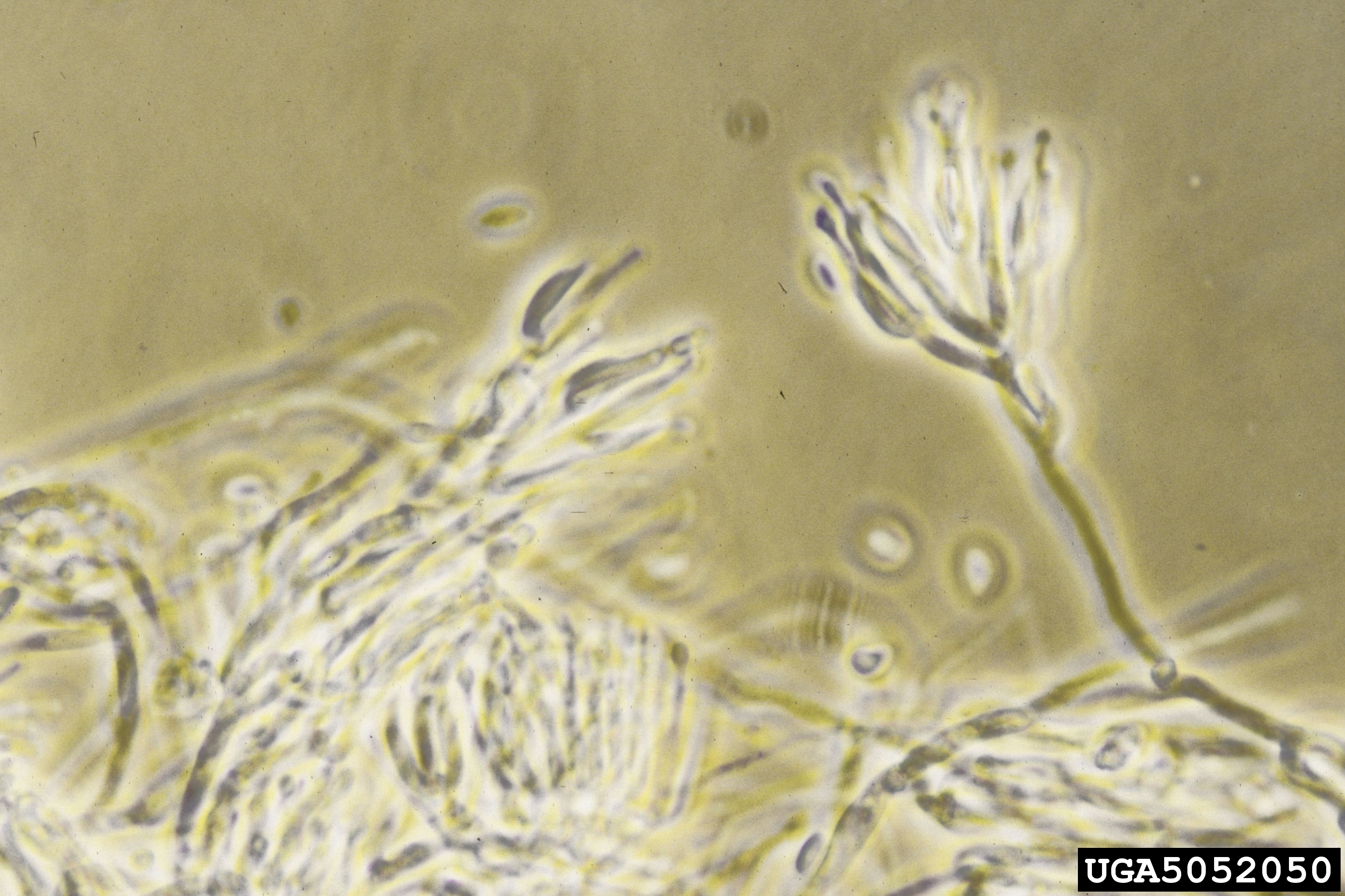
- Bionectria ochroleuca

Scientific classification
- Kingdom: Fungi
- Division: Ascomycota
- Class: Sordariomycetes
- Order: Hypocreales
- Family: Bionectriaceae
- Genus: Bionectria
- Species: B. ochroleuca

Binomial name
- Bionectria ochroleuca (Schwein.) Schroers, & Samuels (1997)

Synonyms
- Creonectria ochroleuca; Cucurbitaria vulgaris; Nectria gliocladioides; Nectria ochroleuca; Nectria vulgaris; Polystigma vulgare; Polystigma vulgare; Sphaeria ochroleuca

= Bionectria ochroleuca =

Species of fungus

Bionectria ochroleuca is a plant pathogen that causes seed rot in oil seed rape.
