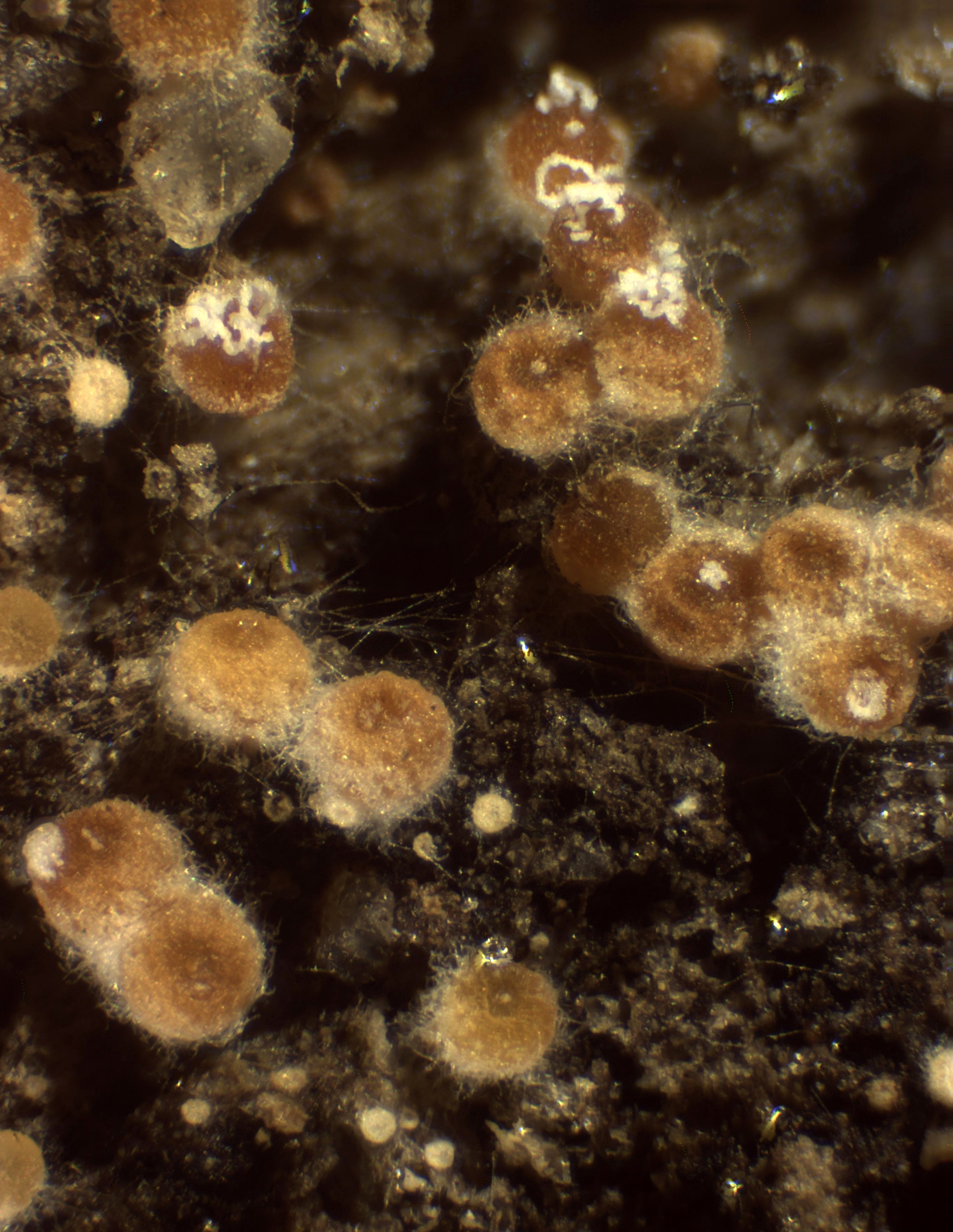
- Lasionectria sp. found in Henry Cowell Redwoods State Park

Scientific classification
- Domain: Eukaryota
- Kingdom: Fungi
- Division: Ascomycota
- Class: Sordariomycetes
- Order: Hypocreales
- Family: Bionectriaceae
- Genus: Lasionectria (Sacc.) Cooke (1884)

Type species
- Lasionectria mantuana (Sacc.) Cooke (1884)

= Lasionectria =

Genus of fungi

Lasionectria is a genus of fungi in the class Sordariomycetes. It consisted of six species in 2008, and 16 in 2023.

== Species ==
As accepted by Species Fungorum;

- Lasionectria albofimbriata (Penz. & Sacc.) Forin & Vizzini (2020)
- Lasionectria antillana (Lechat & Courtec.) Schroers, Ashrafi & W. Maier (2017)
- Lasionectria boothii (D. Hawksw.) Lechat & J. Fourn. (2019)
- Lasionectria calamicola J. Fröhl. & K.D. Hyde (2000)
- Lasionectria cannae Speg. (1909)
- Lasionectria carnea (Desm.) Cooke (1884)
- Lasionectria dothideicola Petch (1925)
- Lasionectria flavida (Corda) Cooke (1884)
- Lasionectria fournieri Lechat (2009)
- Lasionectria hilhorstii L. Lombard (2018)
- Lasionectria krabiensis Tibpromma & K.D. Hyde (2018)
- Lasionectria mantuana (Sacc.) Cooke (1884)
- Lasionectria marigotensis Lechat & J. Fourn. (2013)
- Lasionectria martinicensis Lechat & J. Fourn. (2013)
- Lasionectria oenanthicola (Lechat & Hairaud) Schroers, Ashrafi & W. Maier (2017)
- Lasionectria sansevieriae Crous & L. Zhao (2021)

Former species;

- L. aureola (G. Winter) Petch (1938) = Nectria aureola, Nectriaceae
- L. dorcas (Berk. & Broome) Cooke (1884) = Solenopezia dorcas, Solenopeziaceae
- L. flavida sensu auct. brit., = Nectria ellisii, Nectriaceae
- L. fulva (Fr.) Cooke (1884) = Pseudonectria buxi, Nectriaceae
- L. funicola (Berk. & Broome) Cooke (1884) = Nectria funicola, Nectriaceae
- L. gigantea Speg. (1902) = Hydropisphaera gigantea, Nectriaceae
- L. hirta (A. Bloxam) Cooke (1884) = Trichonectria hirta, Hypocreales order
- L. jungermanniarum (P. Crouan & H. Crouan) Cooke (1884) = Octosporella jungermanniarum, Pyronemataceae
- L. lasioderma (Ellis) Cooke (1884) = Nectriopsis lasioderma, Bionectriaceae
- L. lecanodes (Ces.) Petch (1938) = Nectriopsis lecanodes, Bionectriaceae
- L. leptosphaeriae (Niessl) Petch (1938) = Macroconia sphaeriae, Nectriaceae
- L. macrostroma (Berk. & M.A. Curtis) Cooke (1884) = Hypocreopsis macrostoma, Hypocreaceae
- L. rousseliana (Mont. ex Castagne) Cooke (1884) = Pseudonectria buxi, Nectriaceae
- L. suffulta (Berk. & M.A. Curtis) Cooke (1884) = Hydropisphaera suffulta, Nectriaceae
- L. sylvana (Mouton) Rossman & Samuels (1999) = Nectria sylvana, Nectriaceae
- L. volutella (Berk. & Broome) Cooke (1884) = Melioliphila volutella, Amphisphaeriaceae
- L. vulpina (Cooke) Rossman & Samuels (1999) = Nectria vulpina, Nectriaceae
