= Ijuhya =

Scientific classification
- Kingdom: Fungi
- Division: Ascomycota
- Class: Sordariomycetes
- Order: Hypocreales
- Family: Bionectriaceae
- Genus: Ijuhya; Starbäck (1899)

Type species
- Ijuhya vitrea Starbäck (1899)

Genus of fungi

Ijuhya is a genus of fungi in the class Sordariomycetes. It consisted of seven species in 2008, and 21 species in 2023.

== Species ==
As accepted by Species Fungorum;

- Ijuhya aquifolii (Cooke & Ellis) Rossman & Samuels 1999
- Ijuhya aurantiaca Lechat, J. Fourn. & R. Negrín 2017
- Ijuhya bambusina (Syd. & P. Syd.) Rossman & Samuels 1999
- Ijuhya chilensis (Speg.) Rossman & Samuels 1999
- Ijuhya dictyospora (Rossman) Rossman & Samuels 1999
- Ijuhya doniani H. Li, Manawas. & K.D. Hyde 2024
- Ijuhya equiseti-hyemalis Lechat & Baral 2008
- Ijuhya faveliana Lechat & J. Fourn. 2016
- Ijuhya fournieri Lechat 2015
- Ijuhya hongkongensis J. Fröhl. & K.D. Hyde 2000
- Ijuhya hubeiensis Y. Nong & W.Y. Zhuang 2007
- Ijuhya interrupti H. Li, Manawas. & K.D. Hyde 2024
- Ijuhya leucocarpa (Samuels) Rossman & Samuels 1999
- Ijuhya lilliputiana Lechat & J. Fourn. 2016
- Ijuhya pachydisca Lechat & J. Fourn. 2016
- Ijuhya panamaensis Crous 2026
- Ijuhya paraparilis (Samuels) Rossman & Samuels 1999
- Ijuhya parilis (Syd.) Rossman & Samuels 1999
- Ijuhya salviicola Lechat & J. Fourn. 2019
- Ijuhya saulensis Lechat & J. Fourn. 2019
- Ijuhya somiedoensis Lechat & J. Fourn. 2019
- Ijuhya tetraspora Lechat & J. Fourn. 2016
- Ijuhya vitellina Ashrafi, W. Maier & Schroers 2017
- Ijuhya vitrea Starbäck 1899

Former species;

- I. antillana Lechat & Courtec. (2010) = Lasionectria antillana, Bionectriaceae
- I. boothii (D. Hawksw.) Lechat & J. Fourn. (2017) = Lasionectria boothii, Bionectriaceae
- I. corynospora (Samuels) Rossman & Samuels (1999) = Peristomialis corynospora, Bionectriaceae
- I. dentifera (Samuels) Rossman & Samuels (1999) = Peristomialis dentifera, Bionectriaceae
- I. oenanthicola Lechat & Hairaud (2012) = Lasionectria oenanthicola, Bionectriaceae
- I. peristomialis (Berk. & Broome) Rossman & Samuels (1999) = Peristomialis berkeleyi, Bionectriaceae
- I. vitrea var. javanica Höhn. (1912) = Ijuhya vitrea
