= Halonectria =

Scientific classification
- Kingdom: Fungi
- Division: Ascomycota
- Class: Sordariomycetes
- Order: Hypocreales
- Family: Bionectriaceae
- Genus: Halonectria; E.B.G.Jones (1965)

Type species
- Halonectria milfordensis E.B.G.Jones (1965)

Genus of fungi

Halonectria is a fungal genus in the class Sordariomycetes. This is a monotypic genus, containing the single species Halonectria milfordensis.
