= Globonectria =

Scientific classification
- Domain: Eukaryota
- Kingdom: Fungi
- Division: Ascomycota
- Class: Sordariomycetes
- Order: Hypocreales
- Family: Bionectriaceae
- Genus: Globonectria; Etayo (2002)

Type species
- Globonectria cochensis Etayo (2002)

Genus of fungi

Globonectria is a fungal genus in the class Sordariomycetes. This is a monotypic genus, containing the single species Globonectria cochensis.

The species and genus was published by Javier Etayo in Biblthca Lichenol. vol.84 on page 47 in 2002.
