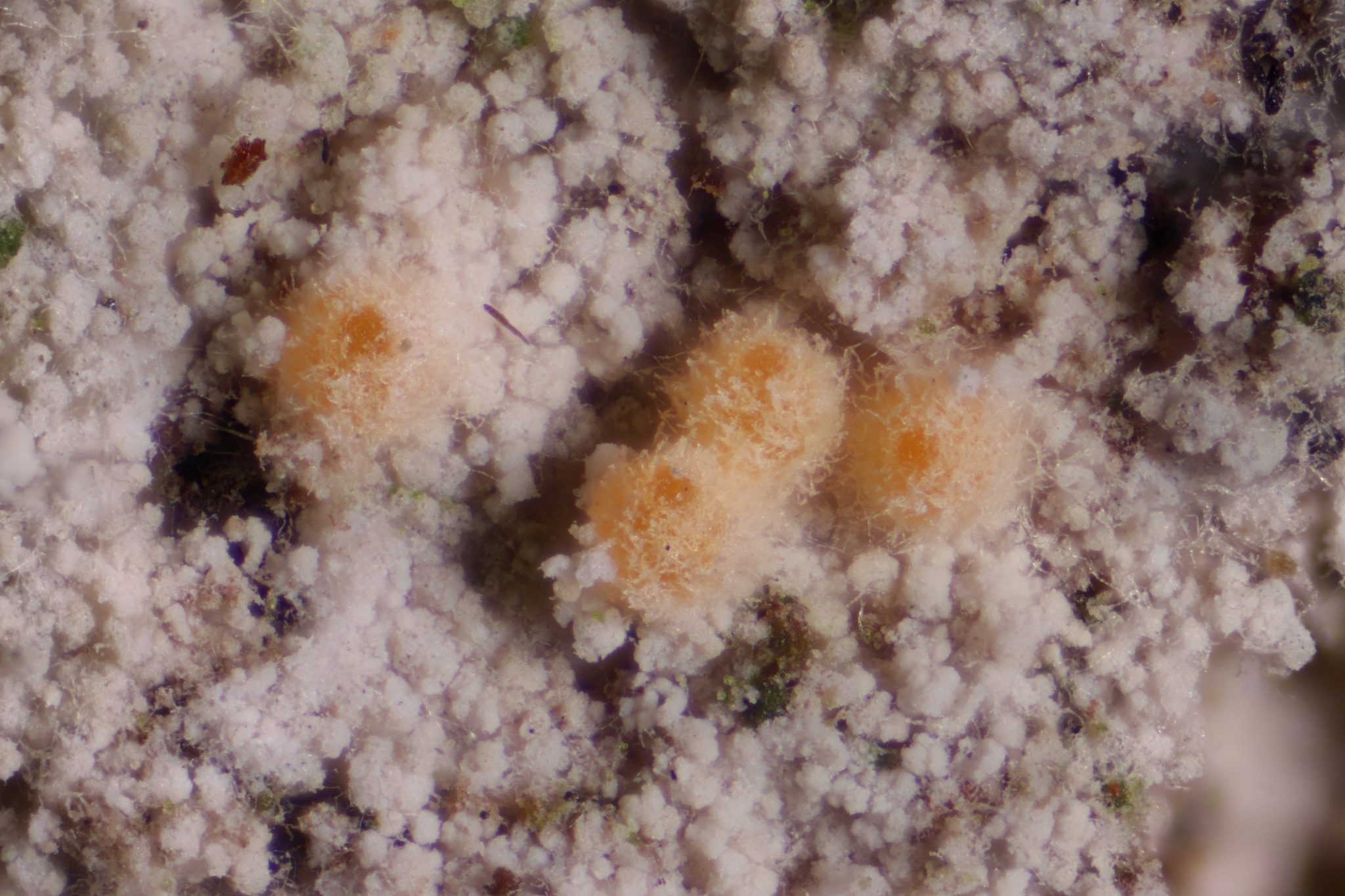
- Paranectria oropensis

Scientific classification
- Kingdom: Fungi
- Division: Ascomycota
- Class: Sordariomycetes
- Order: Hypocreales
- Family: Bionectriaceae
- Genus: Paranectria; Sacc. (1878)

Type species
- Paranectria affinis (Grev.) Sacc. (1878)

= Paranectria =

Genus of fungi

Paranectria is a genus of fungi in the class Sordariomycetes. It consisted of three species in 2008, in 2023 it had 8 species.

== Species ==
As accepted by Species Fungorum;

- Paranectria affinis Sacc. (1878)
- Paranectria alstrupii Zhurb. (2009)
- Paranectria carissiana Sousa da Câmara & Luz (1938)
- Paranectria hemileiae Hansf. (1941)
- Paranectria oropensis (Ces.) D. Hawksw. & Piroz. (1977)
- Paranectria pritzeliana Henn. (1903)
- Paranectria superba D. Hawksw. (1982)
- Paranectria ugandae Hansf. (1941)

Former species;

- P. caespitosa Speg. (1889) = Puttemansia caespitosa, Tubeufiaceae
- P. coralloides (Maubl.) Hansf. (1946) = Melioliphila coralloides, Amphisphaeriaceae
- P. flagellata Hansf. (1941) = Malacaria flagellata, Tubeufiaceae
- P. imperconspicua Höhn. (1909) = Paranectriella imperconspicua, Paranectriellaceae
- P. juruana Henn. (1904) = Paranectriella juruana, Paranectriellaceae
- P. luxurians Rehm (1915) = Malacaria luxurians, Tubeufiaceae
- P. meliolicola F. Stevens (1918) = Paranectriella meliolicola, Paranectriellaceae
- P. meliolicola var. major Hansf. (1941) = Paranectriella meliolicola, Paranectriellaceae
- P. miconiae F. Stevens (1918) = Paranectriella miconiae, Paranectriellaceae
- P. minuta Hansf. (1941) = Paranectriella minuta, Paranectriellaceae
- P. oropensis subsp. parviseptata M.S. Cole & D. Hawksw. (2001) = Paranectria oropensis, Bionectriaceae
- P. sclerochitonis Hansf. (1946) = Puttemansia sclerochitonis, Tubeufiaceae
- P. stromaticola Henn. (1904) = Paranectriella stromaticola, Paranectriellaceae
- P. toddaliae Hansf. (1946) = Puttemansia toddaliae, Tubeufiaceae
- P. wildemaniana Henn. (1906) = Puttemansia wildemaniana, Tubeufiaceae
