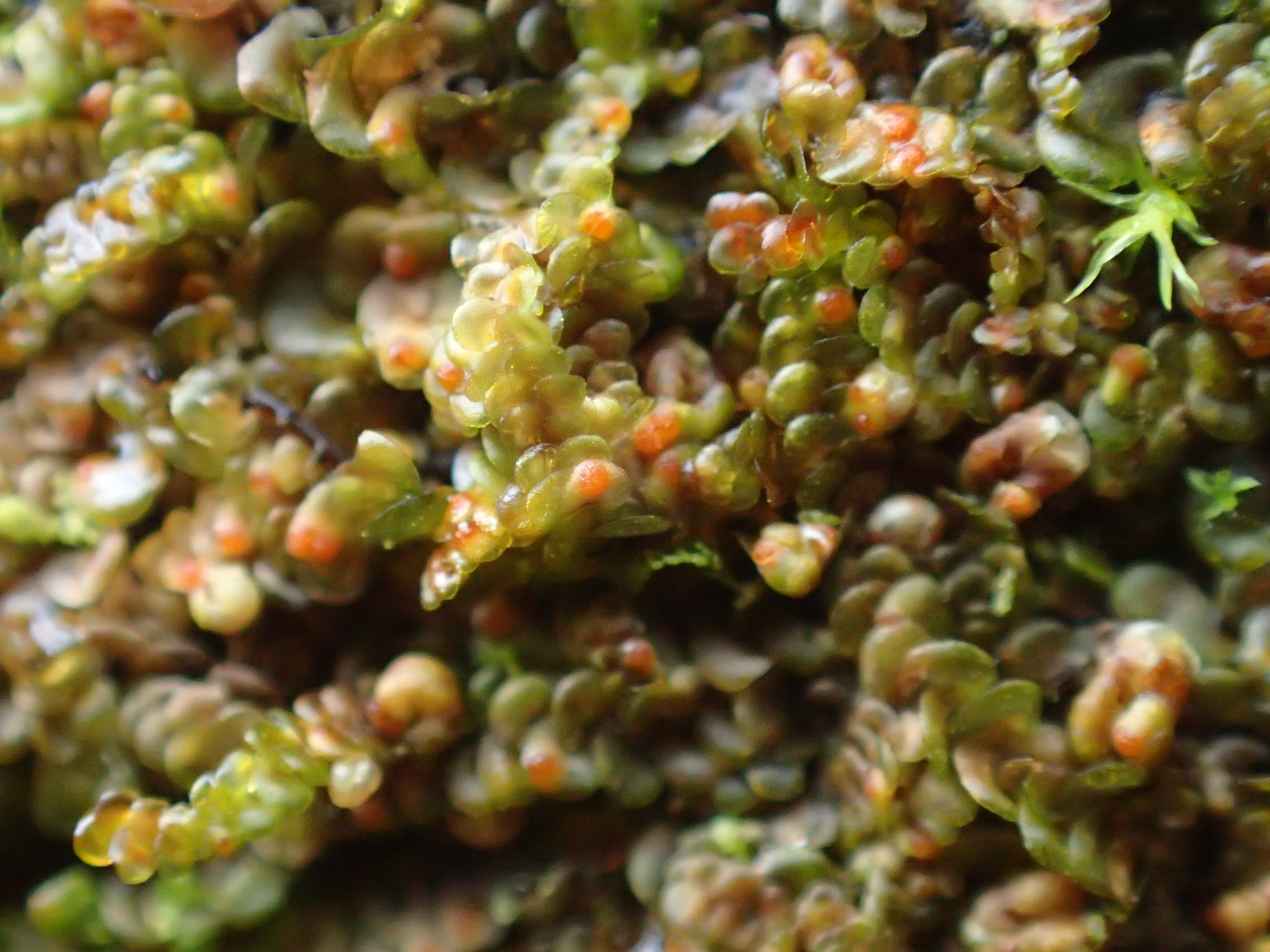
- Bryocentria brongniartii, parasitic on Frullania dilatata

Scientific classification
- Domain: Eukaryota
- Kingdom: Fungi
- Division: Ascomycota
- Class: Sordariomycetes
- Order: Hypocreales
- Family: Bionectriaceae
- Genus: Bryocentria; Döbbeler (2004)

Type species
- Bryocentria brongniartii (P.Crouan & H.Crouan) Döbbeler (2004)

Species
- B. aequinoctialis B. brongniartii B. cyanodesma B. manubriata B. merospora B. metzgeriae B. septinensis

= Bryocentria =

Genus of fungi

Bryocentria is a genus of fungi in the family Bionectriaceae. The genus was described in 2004 by mycologist Peter Döbbeler. Species in the genus have small orange fruit bodies and excipular cells with pitted walls. They have numerous asci containing two-celled ascospores. Species grow parasitically on bryophytes. The genus originally contained three species: B. cyanodesma, B. metzgeriae, and the type species B. brongniartii; an additional four species were described in 2010.
