= Battarrina =

Scientific classification
- Kingdom: Fungi
- Division: Ascomycota
- Class: Sordariomycetes
- Order: Hypocreales
- Family: Bionectriaceae
- Genus: Battarrina (Sacc.) Clem. & Shear (1931)

Type species
- Battarrina inclusa (Berk. & Broome) Clem. & Shear (1931)

Genus of fungi

Battarrina is a genus of fungi in the class Sordariomycetes.
