= Roumegueriella =

Scientific classification
- Domain: Eukaryota
- Kingdom: Fungi
- Division: Ascomycota
- Class: Sordariomycetes
- Order: Hypocreales
- Family: Bionectriaceae
- Genus: Roumegueriella; Speg. (1880)

Type species
- Roumegueriella muricospora Speg. (1880)

Genus of fungi

Roumegueriella is a genus of fungi in the class Sordariomycetes. It consists of three species.

The genus was circumscribed by Carlos Luis Spegazzini in Rev. Mycol. vol.2 on page 18 in 1880.

The genus name of Roumegueriella is in honour of Casimir Roumeguère (1828–1892), who was a French botanist and mycologist.

== Species ==
- Roumegueriella muricospora Speg. (1880)
- Roumegueriella pulchella Udagawa, Uchiy. & Kamiya (1994)
- Roumegueriella rufula (Berk. & Broome) Malloch & Cain (1972)

Former species; Roumegueriella handelii Bubák (1914) = Neozythia handelii
