= Casimir Roumeguère =

French botanist and mycologist (1828–1892)

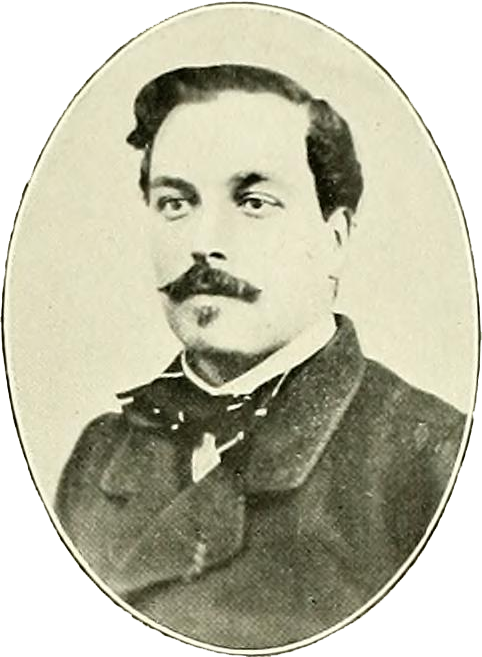
Casimir Roumeguère

Casimir Roumeguère (15 August 1828 in Toulouse – 29 February 1892 in Toulouse) was a French botanist and mycologist.

He served as director of the journal Revue mycologique. His collections of fungi are included in several exsiccatae, including "Fungi (selecti) Gallici exsiccati" and "Fungi selecti exsiccati" with publications. His collection of algae is part of the exsiccatae series: "Algues de France", which he co-edited since 1883.

In addition to his botanical and mycological research, he published a few works in the fields of geology, conchology and archaeology.

== Eponymy ==
- Roumegueria: name of fungus genus introduced by (Pier Andrea Saccardo) Paul Christoph Hennings (1908), all 3 species (in the former genus) are now synonyms for others.
- Roumegueriella: name of fungus genus (class Sordariomycetes), introduced by Carlos Luigi Spegazzini (1880).
- Roumeguerites: name of fungus genus introduced by Petter Adolf Karsten (1879), all 3 species (in the former genus) are now synonyms for others.

The specific epithet of roumeguerii also bears his name; an example is the mycological species Camarosporium roumeguerii.

== Selected writings ==
- Des lichens et en particulier des lichens des environs de Toulouse pouvant être utilisés dans l'économie domestique, la médecine et les arts industriels, 1860 – Lichens, in particular, lichens found in the vicinity of Toulouse.
- Cryptogamie illustrée, ou, Histoire des familles naturelles des plantes acotylédones d'Europe / coordonnée suivant les dernières classifications et complétée par les recherches scientifiques les plus récentes. Famille des lichens, 1868 – Illustrated cryptogamy; history involving acotyledon plants of Europe.
- Nouveaux documents sur l'histoire des plantes cryptogames et phanérogames des Pyrénées, 1876 – New documents on the history of cryptogams and phanerogams of the Pyrénées.
- Statistique botanique du département de la Haute-Garonne, 1876 – Botanical statistics involving the department of Haute-Garonne.
- Flore mycologique du département de Tarn-et-Garonne, 1879 – Mycological flora involving the department of Tarn-et-Garonne.

== See also ==
- Category:Taxa named by Casimir Roumeguère
