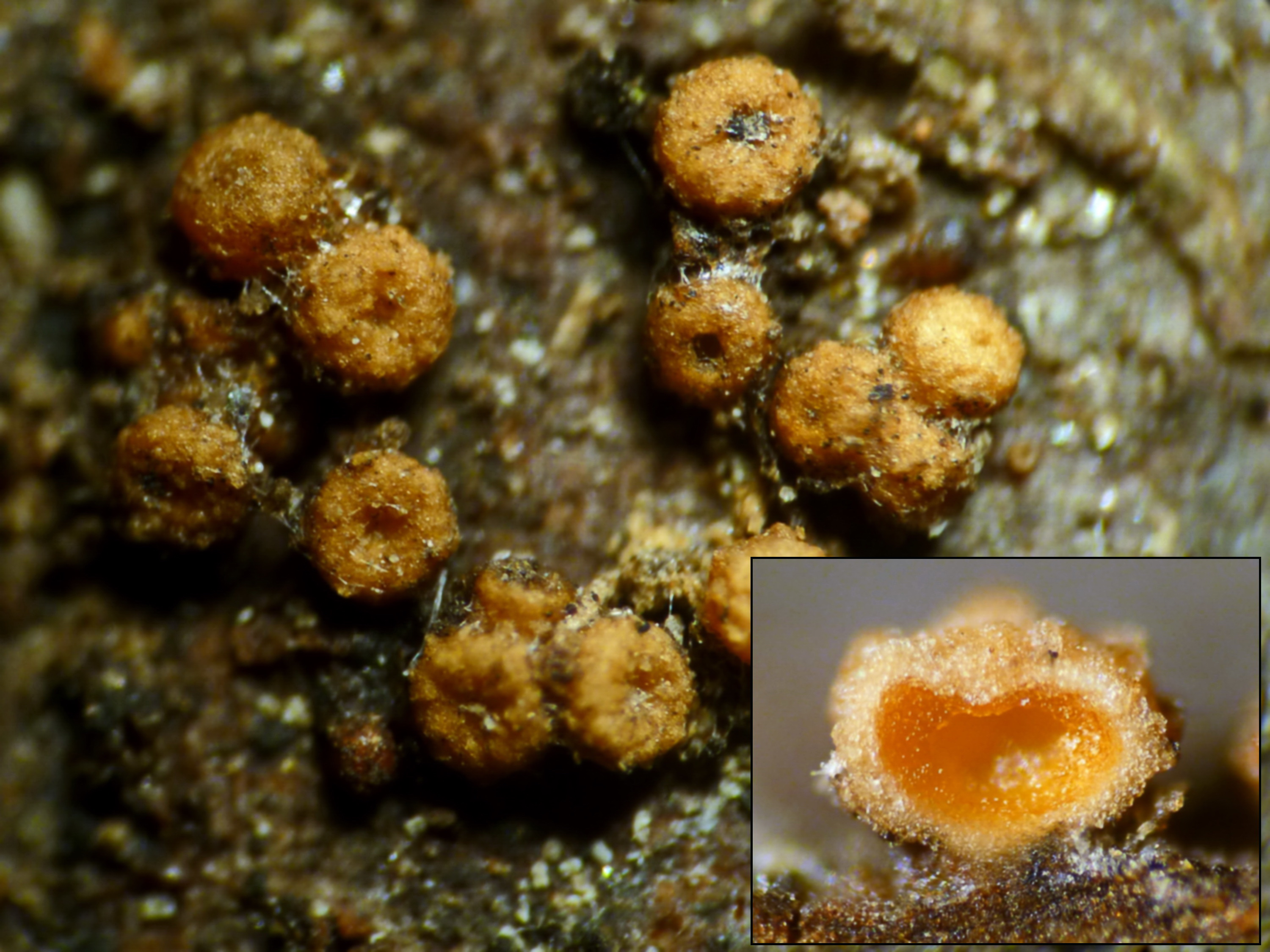
- Bionectria ralfsii growing on a dead branch of Cytisus scoparius

Scientific classification
- Domain: Eukaryota
- Kingdom: Fungi
- Division: Ascomycota
- Class: Sordariomycetes
- Order: Hypocreales
- Family: Bionectriaceae
- Genus: Bionectria; Speg. (1919)

Type species
- Bionectria tonduzii Speg. (1919)

= Bionectria =

Genus of fungi

Bionectria is a genus of fungi in the class Sordariomycetes. The genus was described in 1919 by mycologist Carlos Luigi Spegazzini to include species of Nectria that grew on living plant material.

== Species ==
- B. apocyni
- B. aurantia
- B. aureofulva
- B. aureofulvella
- B. byssicola
- B. capitata
- B. compactiuscula
- B. coronata
- B. epichloe
- B. gibberosa
- B. grammicospora
- B. grammicosporopsis
- B. impariphialis
- B. intermedia
- B. kowhai
- B. lasiacidis
- B. levigata
- B. lucifer
- B. mellea
- B. oblongispora
- B. ochroleuca
- B. parva
- B. parviphialis
- B. pityrodes
- B. pseudochroleuca
- B. pseudostriata
- B. pseudostriatopsis
- B. ralfsii
- B. rossmaniae
- B. samuelsii
- B. sesquicillii
- B. setosa
- B. solani
- B. sporodochialis
- B. subquaternata
- B. tonduzii
- B. tornata
- B. truncata
- B. verrucispora
- B. vesiculosa
- B. wenpingii
- B. zelandiae-novae
