= Protocreopsis =

Scientific classification
- Domain: Eukaryota
- Kingdom: Fungi
- Division: Ascomycota
- Class: Sordariomycetes
- Order: Hypocreales
- Family: Bionectriaceae
- Genus: Protocreopsis; Yoshim. Doi (1977)

Type species
- Protocreopsis zingibericola Yoshim. Doi (1977)

Genus of fungi

Protocreopsis is a genus of fungi in the class Sordariomycetes. It consisted of nine species in 2008, and up to 11 species in 2023.

== Species ==
As accepted by Species Fungorum;

- Protocreopsis bromeliicola (Bat., Nascim. & Cif.) Yoshim. Doi (1978)
- Protocreopsis caricicola Lechat & J. Fourn. (2016)
- Protocreopsis euphorbiae Crous (2021)
- Protocreopsis fusigera (Berk. & Broome) Yoshim. Doi (1978)
- Protocreopsis javanica (Höhn.) Rossman & Samuels (1999)
- Protocreopsis korfii Lechat & J. Fourn. (2016)
- Protocreopsis palmicola Yoshim. Doi (1977)
- Protocreopsis pertusa (Pat.) Samuels & Rossman (1999)
- Protocreopsis scitula (Bres.) Yoshim. Doi (1978)
- Protocreopsis viridis Samuels (1999)
- Protocreopsis zingibericola Yoshim. Doi (1977)

Former species;

- P. albofimbriata (Penz. & Sacc.) Yoshim. Doi (1978) = Lasionectria albofimbriata, Bionectriaceae
- P. foliicola (Berk. & M.A. Curtis) Samuels & Rossman (1999) = Nectria foliicola, Nectriaceae
- P. freycinetiae (Samuels) Samuels & Rossman (1999) = Nectria freycinetiae, Nectriaceae
- P. pertusoides (Samuels) Samuels & Rossman (1999) = Nectria pertusoides, Nectriaceae
- P. phormiicola (Samuels) Samuels & Rossman (1999) = Nectria phormiicola, Nectriaceae
