= Heleococcum =

Scientific classification
- Kingdom: Fungi
- Division: Ascomycota
- Class: Sordariomycetes
- Order: Hypocreales
- Family: Bionectriaceae
- Genus: Heleococcum; P.M.Jørg. (1922)

Type species
- Heleococcum aurantiacum P.M.Jørg. (1922)

Genus of fungi

Heleococcum is a genus of fungi in the class Sordariomycetes. It consists of four species.

== Species ==
As accepted by Species Fungorum;

- Heleococcum alatosporum Udagawa, Uchiy. & Kamiya (1995)
- Heleococcum aurantiacum C.A. Jørg. (1922)
- Heleococcum inapertum Udagawa, Uchiy. & Kamiya (1995)
- Heleococcum japonense Tubaki (1967)
