= Hydropisphaera =

Scientific classification
- Kingdom: Fungi
- Division: Ascomycota
- Class: Sordariomycetes
- Order: Hypocreales
- Family: Bionectriaceae
- Genus: Hydropisphaera; Dumort. (1822)

Type species
- Hydropisphaera peziza (Tode) Dumort. (1822)

Genus of fungi

Hydropisphaera is a genus of fungi in the class Sordariomycetes. It consisted of 18 species in 2008, and 32 species in 2023.

== Species ==
As accepted by Species Fungorum;

- Hydropisphaera angelicae Lechat, J. Fourn. & Rubio (2020)
- Hydropisphaera arenula (Berk. & Broome) Rossman & Samuels (1999)
- Hydropisphaera arenuloides (Samuels) Rossman & Samuels (1999)
- Hydropisphaera bambusicola Lechat (2010)
- Hydropisphaera castaneicola Lechat & Gardiennet (2009)
- Hydropisphaera ciliata Joanne E. Taylor, K.D. Hyde & E.B.G. Jones (2003)
- Hydropisphaera cirsii Lechat & J. Fourn. (2020)
- Hydropisphaera cyatheae (Dingley) Rossman & Samuels (1999)
- Hydropisphaera dolichospora (Penz. & Sacc.) Rossman & Samuels (1999)
- Hydropisphaera erubescens (Roberge ex Desm.) Rossman & Samuels (1999)
- Hydropisphaera fungicola Rossman, D.F. Farr & G. Newc. (2008)
- Hydropisphaera fusigera (Berk. & Broome) Rossman, L. Lombard & Crous (2015)
- Hydropisphaera gigantea (Speg.) Rossman & Samuels (1999)
- Hydropisphaera haematites (Syd. & P. Syd.) Rossman & Samuels (1999)
- Hydropisphaera heliconiae Lechat & J. Fourn. (2017)
- Hydropisphaera hypoxantha (Penz. & Sacc.) Rossman & Samuels (1999)
- Hydropisphaera jigongshanica W.Y. Zhuang & Y. Nong (2005)
- Hydropisphaera leucotricha (Penz. & Sacc.) Rossman & Samuels (1999)
- Hydropisphaera macrarenula (Samuels) Rossman & Samuels (1999)
- Hydropisphaera multiloculata (Samuels) Rossman & Samuels (1999)
- Hydropisphaera multiseptata (Samuels) Rossman & Samuels (1999)
- Hydropisphaera nymaniana (Henn.) Rossman & Samuels (1999)
- Hydropisphaera pachyderma (Rossman) Rossman & Samuels (1999)
- Hydropisphaera peziza (Tode) Dumort. (1822)
- Hydropisphaera pseudoarenula Lechat & J. Fourn. (2020)
- Hydropisphaera rufofusca (Penz. & Sacc.) Rossman & Samuels (1993)
- Hydropisphaera saulensis Lechat & J. Fourn. (2020)
- Hydropisphaera sinensis W.Y. Zhuang, Rossman & Samuels (2000)
- Hydropisphaera spinulosa Z.Q. Zeng & W.Y. Zhuang (2016)
- Hydropisphaera suffulta (Berk. & M.A. Curtis) Rossman & Samuels (1999)
- Hydropisphaera yunnanensis J. Luo & W.Y. Zhuang (2010)
- Hydropisphaera znieffensis Lechat & J. Fourn. (2016)

Former species; H. boothii (D. Hawksw.) Rossman & Samuels (1999) = Lasionectria boothii, Bionectriaceae
