= Trichonectria =

Scientific classification
- Kingdom: Fungi
- Division: Ascomycota
- Class: Sordariomycetes
- Order: Hypocreales
- Family: Bionectriaceae
- Genus: Trichonectria; Kirschst. (1906)

Type species
- Trichonectria aculeata Kirschst. (1906)

Genus of fungi

Trichonectria is a genus of fungi in the class Sordariomycetes.

== Species ==
As of March 2023, Species Fungorum (in the Catalogue of Life) accepts 21 species of Trichonectria:

- Trichonectria albidopilosa (Rogerson & Samuels) Samuels (1988)
- Trichonectria apiculata Etayo (2017)
- Trichonectria australis Etayo (2008)
- Trichonectria calopadiicola Farkas & Flakus (2016)
- Trichonectria cladoniicola (Alstrup & Svane) Alstrup (2004)
- Trichonectria erythroxylifoliae (Viégas) Samuels (1988)
- Trichonectria furcatosetosa Brackel (2014)
- Trichonectria hirta (A.Bloxam) Petch (1937)
- Trichonectria horrida Samuels (1988)
- Trichonectria hyalocristata Scheuer (1988)
- Trichonectria hypotrachynae Etayo (2002)
- Trichonectria intermedia Etayo (2017)
- Trichonectria leptogiicola Etayo (2001)
- Trichonectria pellucida Döbbeler (1978)
- Trichonectria pertusariae Etayo & van den Boom (2005)
- Trichonectria pyrenaica Gardiennet & Lechat (2012)
- Trichonectria rectipila Samuels, Rogerson & M.E.Barr (1988)
- Trichonectria rosella Höhn. (1918)
- Trichonectria setadpressa Etayo (2002)
- Trichonectria syzygii Z.Q.Yuan & M.E. Barr (1996)
- Trichonectria usneicola Etayo (2002)
