= Ijuhya interrupti =

Scientific classification
- Kingdom: Fungi
- Division: Ascomycota
- Class: Sordariomycetes
- Order: Hypocreales
- Family: Ijuhyaceae
- Genus: Ijuhya
- Species: I. interrupti

Binomial name
- Ijuhya interrupti H. Li, Manawas. & K.D. Hyde 2024

Species of fungus

Ijuhya interrupti is a species of fungus in the family Ijuhyaceae. It feeds on dead material of Cyclosorus interruptus, a species of fern.

== Taxonomy and etymology ==
The species was formally described by Hua Li and colleagues in 2024 as IIjuhya interruptusnesis. The type locality is Xishuangbanna, Yunnan Province, China. The inspiration for the specific epithet is the plant it was discovered on, Cyclosorus interruptus.

== Description ==
The ascomata (fruiting bodies) have an average height and diameter of 155 microns and 140 microns, respectively. Their color ranges from pale yellow to orange and they retain their shape (spherical, or approaching that of a cylinder) when dried. Clear or pale yellow triangle-shaped tentacles formed from clusters of hyphae sprout from the ascomata, which cover up its surface. The asci (spore-bearing cells) average 48 microns long and 7 microns wide and have eight ascospores, arranged in either rows or bundles. Those ascospores average 17 microns long and 3 microns wide, are bent somewhat and sometimes twisted, have striations that run along the length, and have one septum.

The anamorph (asexual reproductive stage) is unknown.

Ijuhya interrupti is most closely related to its sister taxon, Ijuhya paraparilis, but can be distinguished by its smaller asci and ascospores. Additionally, the ascospores of Ijuhya paraparilis have no lengthwise striations. Ijuhya interrupti is also closely related to Ijuhya chilensis, but again has smaller ascospores as well as a couple genetic differences.

== Ecology ==
Ijuhya interrupti is saprotrophic on decomposing branches of Cyclosorus interruptus, and the ascomata can be removed from these branches with little effort.
