= Selinia (fungus) =

Scientific classification
- Kingdom: Fungi
- Division: Ascomycota
- Class: Sordariomycetes
- Order: Hypocreales
- Family: Bionectriaceae
- Genus: Selinia; P.Karst. (1876)

Type species
- Selinia pulchra (G.Winter) Sacc. (1883)

Genus of fungi

Selinia is a genus of fungi in the class Sordariomycetes. It consisted of two species in 2008, and had 5 species in 2023.

== Species ==
As accepted by Species Fungorum;

- Selinia africana R.S. Khan & J.C. Krug (1989)
- Selinia antarctica Speg. (1887)
- Selinia intermedia Speg. (1887)
- Selinia pulchra (G. Winter) Sacc. (1883)
- Selinia subtropica Speg. (1909)

Former species; S. pulchra (G. Winter) Kuntze (1891) = Selinia pulchra
