= Scolicotrichum =

Scientific classification
- Kingdom: Fungi
- Division: Ascomycota
- Class: Dothideomycetes
- Order: Mycosphaerellales
- Family: Mycosphaerellaceae
- Genus: Scolicotrichum; Kunze

Species
- Scolicotrichum phyllostachydis Teng

Genus of fungi

In mycology Scolicotrichum is a historically defined genus of fungi currently classified in the family Mycosphaerellaceae, though its circumscription has not been extensively tested with modern phylogenetic analysis.

In 1923, Höhnel transferred Scolicotrichum musae to Cordana as Cordana musae.
