= Mycocitrus phyllostachydis =

Scientific classification
- Kingdom: Fungi
- Division: Ascomycota
- Class: Sordariomycetes
- Order: Hypocreales
- Family: Bionectriaceae
- Genus: Mycocitrus
- Species: M. phyllostachydis

Binomial name
- Mycocitrus phyllostachydis (Syd.) Yoshim. Doi (1967)

Synonyms
- Ustilaginoidea phyllostachydis Syd. (1900); Hypocreopsis phyllostachydis (Syd.) I.Miyake & Hara (1910); Shiraiella phyllostachydis (Syd. & P.Syd.) Hara (1914)

Species of fungus

Mycocitrus phyllostachydis is a fungus species in the family Bionectriaceae. It is a parasite of the Phyllostachys bamboos.
