= Acotyledon =

Acotyledon is used to refer to seed plants or spermatophytes that lack cotyledons, such as orchids and dodder. Orchid seeds are tiny with underdeveloped embryos. They depend on mycorrhizal fungi for their early nutrition so are myco-heterotrophs at that stage.

Although some authors, especially in the 19th century and earlier, use the word acotyledon to include plants which have no cotyledons because they lack seeds entirely (such as ferns and mosses), others restrict the term to plants which have seeds but no cotyledons.

Flowering plants or angiosperms are divided into two large groups. Monocotyledons or monocots have one seed lobe, which is often modified to absorb stored nutrients from the seed so never emerges from the seed or becomes photosynthetic. Dicotyledons or dicots have two cotyledons and often germinate to produce two leaf-like cotyledons. Conifers and other gymnosperms lack flowers but may have two or more cotyledons in the seedling.
