= Gliomastix =

Scientific classification
- Kingdom: Fungi
- Division: Ascomycota
- Class: Sordariomycetes
- Order: Hypocreales
- Family: Bionectriaceae
- Genus: Gliomastix; Guég.

Genus of fungi

Gliomastix is a genus of fungi belonging to the family Bionectriaceae.

The genus was first described by Fernand Pierre Joseph Guéguen in 1905.

The genus has cosmopolitan distribution.

== History ==
The taxonomic placement of Gliomastix is controversial and debated by many authors (Gams 1971; Matsushima 1975; Domsch et al. 2007; Lechat et al. 2010; Summerbell et al. 2011; Kiyuna et al. 2011). Gams (1971) placed Gliomastix in a section of Acremonium. Matsushima (1975) placed Acremonium masseei and Acremonium polychromum in Gliomastix and Lechat et al. (2010) linked G. fusigera with the sexual morph of Hydropisphaera bambusicola. Kiyuna et al. (2011) and Summerbell et al. (2011) revised and compiled the taxonomy of Gliomastix. Kiyuna et al. (2011) agreed with Gams's concept and accepted Gliomastix as a section of Acremonium. However, Summerbell et al. (2011) did not follow the Gams's concept and recognized Gliomastix as a distinct genus. Their phylogenetic analysis supported Gliomastix differs from previous morphological concepts by excluding several distantly related species e.g., Acremonium cerealis and A. inflatum. Maharachchikumbura et al. (2015), and Hyde et al. (2020a) followed the treatment of Summerbell et al. (2011) treated Gliomastix as a distinct genus in family Bionectriaceae.

== Species ==
As of July 2023, Species Fungorum (in the Catalog of Life) accepts about 19 species of Gliomastix;

- Gliomastix arctiaggregata Matsush. (1975)
- Gliomastix cerealis (P. Karst.) C.H. Dickinson (1968)
- Gliomastix chartarum (Cooke) Guég. (1905)
- Gliomastix chongqingensis Y.L. Zhang & T.Y. Zhang (2013)
- Gliomastix guttuliformis J.C. Br. & W.B. Kendr. (1958)
- Gliomastix inflata C.H. Dickinson (1968)
- Gliomastix luzulae (Fuckel) E.W. Mason ex S. Hughes (1958)
- Gliomastix macrocerealis Matsush. (1989)
- Gliomastix macrocylindrica K. Matsush. & Matsush. (1995)
- Gliomastix macroelata Matsush. (1985)
- Gliomastix musicola (Speg.) C.H. Dickinson (1968)
- Gliomastix novae-zelandiae S. Hughes & C.H. Dickinson (1968)
- Gliomastix pallescens W. Song, J.F. Yu & T.Y. Zhang (2008)
- Gliomastix pandani Whitton, K.D. Hyde & McKenzie (2012)
- Gliomastix ramosa Matsush. (1971)
- Gliomastix roseogrisea (S.B. Saksena) Summerb. (2011)
- Gliomastix tibetensis Y.H. Geng & T.Y. Zhang (2011)
- Gliomastix tumulicola (Kiyuna, K.D. An, R. Kigawa & Sugiy.) Summerb. (2011)
- Gliomastix variabilis Y.L. Zhang & T.Y. Zhang (2014); Hypocreales
- Gliomastix verrucipes T.Y. Zhang, Y.M. Wu & J.J. Xu (2018)
