= Leucosphaerina =

Scientific classification
- Kingdom: Fungi
- Division: Ascomycota
- Class: Sordariomycetes
- Order: Hypocreales
- Family: incertae sedis
- Genus: Leucosphaerina; Arx

Type species
- Leucosphaerina indica (Arx, Mukerji & N. Singh) Arx

Genus of fungi

Leucosphaerina is a genus of fungi in the Hypocreales order. The relationship of this taxon to other taxa within the order is unknown (incertae sedis), and it has not yet been placed with certainty into any family.
