= Scyphospora =

Scientific classification
- Kingdom: Fungi
- Division: Ascomycota
- Class: Sordariomycetes
- Order: Amphisphaeriales
- Family: Apiosporaceae
- Genus: Scyphospora

Genus of fungi

Scyphospora is a genus of fungi in the family Apiosporaceae.

== Species ==
- Scyphospora phyllostachydicola
- Scyphospora hysterina
