= Clonostachys (fungus) =

Scientific classification
- Domain: Eukaryota
- Kingdom: Fungi
- Division: Ascomycota
- Class: Sordariomycetes
- Order: Hypocreales
- Family: Bionectriaceae
- Genus: Clonostachys; Corda

Synonyms
- Clonostachyopsis Höhn.; Verticilliodochium Bubák; Verticillis Clem. & Shear

Genus of fungi

Clonostachys is a genus of fungi in the order Hypocreales and family Bionectriaceae.

Clonostachys has a worldwide distribution and is commonly found in tropical and subtropical regions (Schroers 2001; Domsch et al. 2007). Species in the genus are saprobes, endophytes, plant pathogens and mycoparasites from various habitats including soil (Schroers 2001; Toledo et al. 2006; Zhang et al. 2008; Moreira et al. 2016).

Clonostachys rosea is of interest as a biological pest control agent.

== Species ==
75 species were included by the Global Biodiversity Information Facility As of 2023, 60 species are listed Species Fungorum:

- Clonostachys agarwalii (Kushwaha) Schroers
- Clonostachys ambigua (Penz. & Sacc.) Forin & Vizzini (2020)
- Clonostachys apocyni (Peck) Rossman, L.Lombard & Crous
- Clonostachys aranearum Wan H.Chen, Y.F.Han, J.D.Liang, X.Zou, Z.Q.Liang & D.C.Jin
- Clonostachys asymmetrica (Samuels) Schroers
- Clonostachys aurantia (Penz. & Sacc.) Rossman, L.Lombard & Crous
- Clonostachys blumenaviae (Rehm) Rossman, L.Lombard & Crous
- Clonostachys candelabrum (Bonord.) Schroers
- Clonostachys candida Harz
- Clonostachys chlorina Schroers
- Clonostachys chloroleuca G.M.Moreira, L.M.Abreu, Pfenning & Schroers
- Clonostachys chongqingensis Z.Q. Zeng & W.Y. Zhuang (2022)
- Clonostachys coccicola (J.A.Stev.) H.T.Dao
- Clonostachys compacta Petch
- Clonostachys compactiuscula (Sacc.) D.Hawksw. & W.Gams
- Clonostachys coxeniae Y.P. Tan, Marney, Hywel-Jones & R.G. Shivas (2023)
- Clonostachys cylindrospora Höhn.
- Clonostachys dichotoma Bayl.Ell.
- Clonostachys divergens Schroers
- Clonostachys eriocamporesiana R.H. Perera & K.D. Hyde (2020)
- Clonostachys essexcoheniae Y.P. Tan, Bishop-Hurley & R.G. Shivas (2023)
- Clonostachys farinosa (Henn.) Rossman
- Clonostachys gibberosa (Schroers) Rossman, L.Lombard & Crous (2015)
- Clonostachys granuligera (Starbäck) Forin & Vizzini (2020)
- Clonostachys indica Prasher & R.Chauhan
- Clonostachys intermedia Schroers
- Clonostachys krabiensis Tibpromma & K.D.Hyde (2018)
- Clonostachys leptoderma Z.Q. Zeng & W.Y. Zhuang (2022)
- Clonostachys leucaenae R.H. Perera & K.D. Hyde (2023)
- Clonostachys manihotis (Rick) Rossman, L.Lombard & Crous (2015)
- Clonostachys mellea (Teng & S.H.Ou) Z.Q.Zeng & W.Y.Zhuang (2017)
- Clonostachys moreaui Lechat, J. Fourn. & Gasch (2020)
- Clonostachys oligospora Z.Q. Zeng & W.Y. Zhuang (2022)
- Clonostachys pallens (Penz. & Sacc.) Forin & Vizzini (2020)
- Clonostachys parva (Schroers) Rossman, L.Lombard & Crous (2015)
- Clonostachys phyllophila Schroers (2001)
- Clonostachys pilosella Lechat & J. Fourn. (2020)
- Clonostachys pnagiana Lechat & J. Fourn. (2020)
- Clonostachys populi Harz (1871)
- Clonostachys pseudobotrytis Höhn. (1902)
- Clonostachys pseudosetosa (Samuels) Schroers (2001)
- Clonostachys pseudostriatopsis Hirooka & Tak.Kobay. (2007)
- Clonostachys pulvinata Petch (1927)
- Clonostachys rhizophaga Schroers (2001)
- Clonostachys rogersoniana Schroers (2001)
- Clonostachys rosea (Link) Schroers, Samuels, Seifert & W.Gams (1999)
- Clonostachys saulensis Lechat & J.Fourn. (2019)
- Clonostachys simmonsii Massee (1907)
- Clonostachys spinulosa R.H. Perera, E.B.G. Jones & K.D. Hyde (2023)
- Clonostachys spinulosispora Lechat & J.Fourn. (2018)
- Clonostachys squamuligera (Sacc.) Forin & Vizzini (2020)
- Clonostachys swieteniae R.H. Perera, E.B.G. Jones & K.D. Hyde (2020)
- Clonostachys tonduzii (Speg.) Rossman, L.Lombard & Crous (2015)
- Clonostachys tornata (Höhn.) Rossman, L.Lombard & Crous (2015)
- Clonostachys truncata (J.Luo & W.Y.Zhuang) Z.Q.Zeng & W.Y.Zhuang (2017)
- Clonostachys vesiculosa (J.Luo & W.Y.Zhuang) Z.Q.Zeng & W.Y.Zhuang (2017)
- Clonostachys viticola C. Torcato & A. Alves (2020)
- Clonostachys wenpingii (J.Luo & W.Y.Zhuang) Z.Q.Zeng & W.Y.Zhuang (2014)

Former species (all are Bionectriaceae, except if mentioned);

- C. araucaria Corda (1839) = Clonostachys rosea
- C. araucaria var. compacta Preuss (1853) = Clonostachys rosea
- C. araucaria var. confusa Pinkerton (1936) = Clonostachys rosea
- C. araucaria var. rosea Preuss (1853) = Clonostachys rosea
- C. aureofulvella Schroers (2001) = Bionectria aureofulvella
- C. buxi (J.C. Schmidt ex Link) Schroers (2001) = Pseudonectria buxi, Nectriaceae
- C. byssicola Schroers (2001) = Bionectria byssicola
- C. capitata Schroers (2001) = Bionectria capitata
- C. catenulata (J.C. Gilman & E.V. Abbott) B. Jensen, D.F. Jensen & J. Larsen (2008) = Clonostachys rosea
- C. cylindrospora G. Arnaud (1952) = Clonostachys compactiuscula
- C. epichloe Schroers (2001) = Bionectria epichloe
- C. grammicospora Schroers & Samuels (2001) = Bionectria grammicospora
- C. grammicosporopsis Schroers & Samuels (2001) = Bionectria grammicosporopsis
- C. impariphialis (Samuels) Schroers (2001) = Bionectria impariphialis
- C. kowhai Schroers (2001) = Bionectria kowhai
- C. lasiacidis Schroers (2001) = Bionectria lasiacidis
- C. levigata Schroers (2001) = Bionectria levigata
- C. lucifer Schroers & Samuels (2001) = Bionectria lucifer
- C. macrospora (Sacc. & Ellis) Schroers & W. Gams (2001) = Clonostachys apocyni
- C. miodochialis Schroers (2001) = Clonostachys parva
- C. oblongispora Schroers (2001) = Bionectria oblongispora
- C. pityrodes Schroers (2001) = Bionectria pityrodes
- C. populi var. aesculi Oudem. (1904) = Clonostachys populi
- C. pseudochroleuca Schroers (2001) = Bionectria pseudochroleuca
- C. pseudostriata Schroers (2001) = Bionectria pseudostriata
- C. ralfsii Schroers (2001) = Bionectria ralfsii
- C. rosea f. catenulata (J.C. Gilman & E.V. Abbott) Schroers (2001) = Clonostachys rosea
- C. rossmaniae Schroers (2001) = Bionectria rossmaniae
- C. samuelsii Schroers (2001) = Bionectria samuelsii
- C. sesquicillii Schroers (2001) = Bionectria sesquicillii
- C. setosa (Vittal) Schroers (2001) = Bionectria setosa
- C. solani (Harting) Schroers & W. Gams (2001) = Bionectria solani
- C. solani f. nigrovirens (J.F.H. Beyma) Schroers (2001) = Bionectria solani
- C. spectabilis (Harz) Sacc. (1886) = Peziza ostracoderma, Pezizaceae
- C. sporodochialis Schroers (2001) = Bionectria sporodochialis
- C. subquaternata Schroers & Samuels (2001) = Bionectria subquaternata
- C. verrucispora Schroers (2001) = Bionectria verrucispora
- C. zelandiae-novae Schroers (2001) = Bionectria zelandiae-novae
