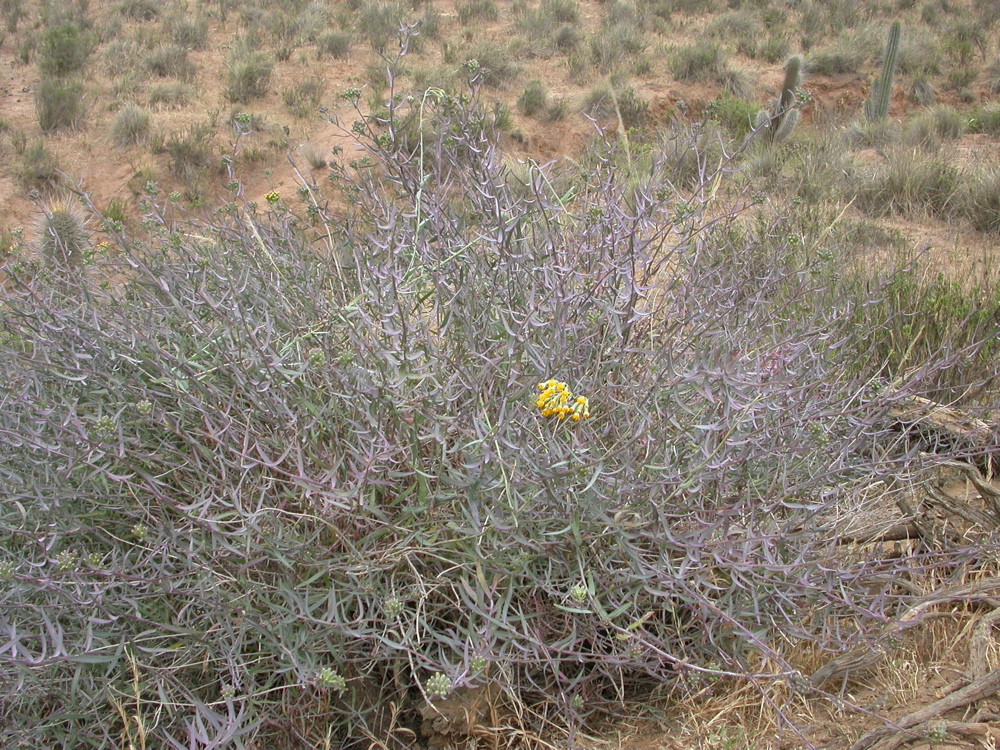

Scientific classification
- Kingdom: Plantae
- Clade: Tracheophytes
- Clade: Angiosperms
- Clade: Eudicots
- Clade: Asterids
- Order: Asterales
- Family: Asteraceae
- Genus: Senecio
- Species: S. murorum

Binomial name
- Senecio murorum J.Rémy

Synonyms
- Source: IPNI,

= Senecio murorum =

Species of flowering plant

Senecio murorum is a species of flowering plant in the genus Senecio and family Asteraceae.
