= Stilbocrea =

Scientific classification
- Kingdom: Fungi
- Division: Ascomycota
- Class: Sordariomycetes
- Order: Hypocreales
- Family: Bionectriaceae
- Genus: Stilbocrea; Pat. (1900)

Type species
- Stilbocrea dussii Pat. (1900)

Species
- S. aterrima S. dussii S. hypocreoides S. impressa S. intermedia S. jenkiana

Genus of fungi

Stilbocrea is a genus of fungi in the class Sordariomycetes. A 2008 estimate placed six species in the genus.
