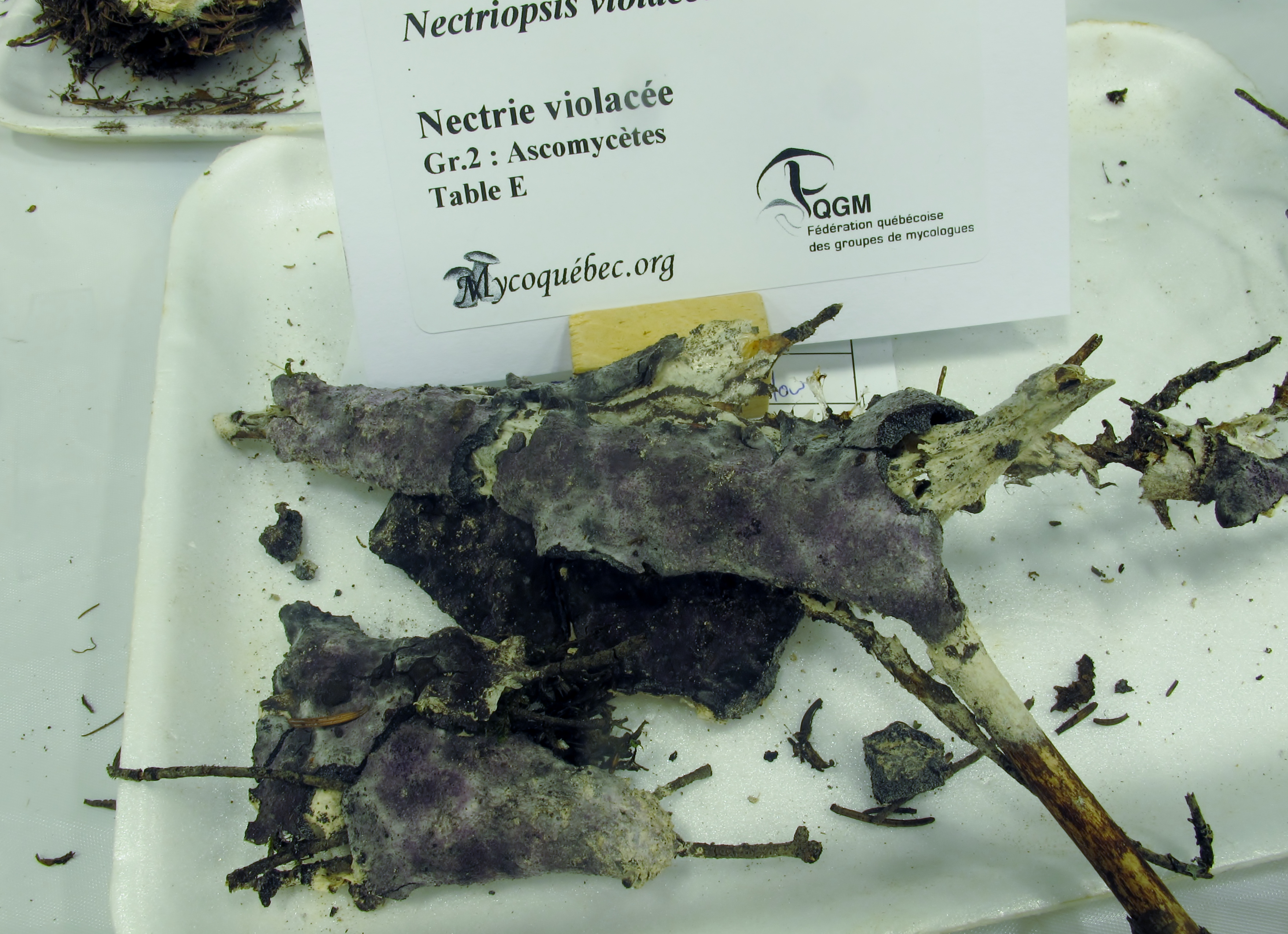
- Nectriopsis violacea

Scientific classification
- Domain: Eukaryota
- Kingdom: Fungi
- Division: Ascomycota
- Class: Sordariomycetes
- Order: Hypocreales
- Family: Bionectriaceae
- Genus: Nectriopsis; Maire (1911)

Type species
- Nectriopsis violacea (J.C.Schmidt ex Fr.) Maire (1911)

= Nectriopsis =

Genus of fungi

Nectriopsis is a genus of fungi in the class Sordariomycetes. The number of species in this genus varies between sources. The Dictionary of Fungi lists only 58 species, but the Catalogue of Life includes 72 species.

== Species ==
This species list includes 72 accepted species of Nectriopsis.

- Nectriopsis albida Etayo
- Nectriopsis albofulta (Petch) Samuels
- Nectriopsis anthostomellicola Whitton, K.D. Hyde & McKenzie
- Nectriopsis apiosporae J. Luo & W.Y. Zhuang
- Nectriopsis broomeana (Tul. & C. Tul.) W. Gams
- Nectriopsis byssotecta (Rehm) Samuels
- Nectriopsis candicans (Plowr.) Maire
- Nectriopsis cariosae Brackel & D.G. Zimm.
- Nectriopsis cladoniicola M.S. Cole & D. Hawksw.
- Nectriopsis collematis Diederich accepted
- Nectriopsis cordiae (Rehm) Samuels
- Nectriopsis cupulata (Theiss.) Samuels
- Nectriopsis curtiseta Etayo
- Nectriopsis discicola (Rogerson & Samuels) Samuels
- Nectriopsis discophila (Rogerson & Samuels) Samuels
- Nectriopsis epimyces Samuels
- Nectriopsis epimycota Samuels
- Nectriopsis epinectria (Teng) Samuels
- Nectriopsis exigua (Pat.) W. Gams
- Nectriopsis flavella (Pat.) Samuels
- Nectriopsis frangospora Brackel
- Nectriopsis fuliginicola Zare & W. Gams
- Nectriopsis gangwondoensis S.Y. Kondr., L. Lőkös & Hur
- Nectriopsis guamuesii Etayo
- Nectriopsis hainanensis X.M. Zhang & W.Y. Zhuang
- Nectriopsis heterodermiae Etayo
- Nectriopsis hirsuta (Samuels) Samuels
- Nectriopsis hirta Etayo
- Nectriopsis hongkongensis W.Y. Zhuang & X.M. Zhang
- Nectriopsis hyperbiota Samuels
- Nectriopsis hypocrellicola (Henn.) Samuels
- Nectriopsis indigens (Arnold) Diederich & Schroers
- Nectriopsis infusaria (Cooke & Harkn.) Yoshim. Doi
- Nectriopsis lasioderma (Ellis) Samuels
- Nectriopsis lasiodermopsis Samuels
- Nectriopsis lecanodes (Ces.) Diederich & Schroers
- Nectriopsis leptogii Diederich
- Nectriopsis lichenophila (Speg.) Etayo
- Nectriopsis lilliputia Samuels
- Nectriopsis lindauiana (Bubák) Zare & W. Gams
- Nectriopsis macroephichloe Samuels
- Nectriopsis melongenoidea Etayo & Palice
- Nectriopsis micareae Diederich, van den Boom & G. Ernst
- Nectriopsis microthecia Samuels
- Nectriopsis mindoensis (Petr.) Samuels
- Nectriopsis nanocarpa Samuels
- Nectriopsis oropensoides (Rehm) Samuels
- Nectriopsis ostiolorum (Berk. & Cooke) Samuels
- Nectriopsis oxyspora Samuels
- Nectriopsis perpusilla (Mont.) Samuels
- Nectriopsis peruvianus Etayo
- Nectriopsis physciicola D. Hawksw. & Earl.-Benn.
- Nectriopsis porinicola Samuels
- Nectriopsis puiggarii (Speg.) Samuels
- Nectriopsis queletii (P. Karst.) Samuels
- Nectriopsis rexiana (Sacc.) Rossman, L. Lombard & Crous
- Nectriopsis rubefaciens (Ellis & Everh.) M.S. Cole & D. Hawksw.
- Nectriopsis sasae (Yoshim. Doi) Rossman & Samuels
- Nectriopsis septofusidiae Samuels
- Nectriopsis sepultariae (Ade) Samuels
- Nectriopsis sibicola Samuels
- Nectriopsis silvaustralis Etayo
- Nectriopsis sororicola Samuels
- Nectriopsis sporangiicola (Samuels) Samuels
- Nectriopsis squamulosa (Ellis) Samuels
- Nectriopsis tatrensis (Alstrup) Lisická & Alstrup
- Nectriopsis tremellicola (Ellis & Everh.) W. Gams
- Nectriopsis uredinophila (Syd.) W.Y. Zhuang & X.M. Zhang
- Nectriopsis verseghyklarae S.Y. Kondr., Lőkös & Hur
- Nectriopsis vinosa Etayo
- Nectriopsis violacea (J.C. Schmidt ex Fr.) Maire
- Nectriopsis vivida Etayo & Sipman
