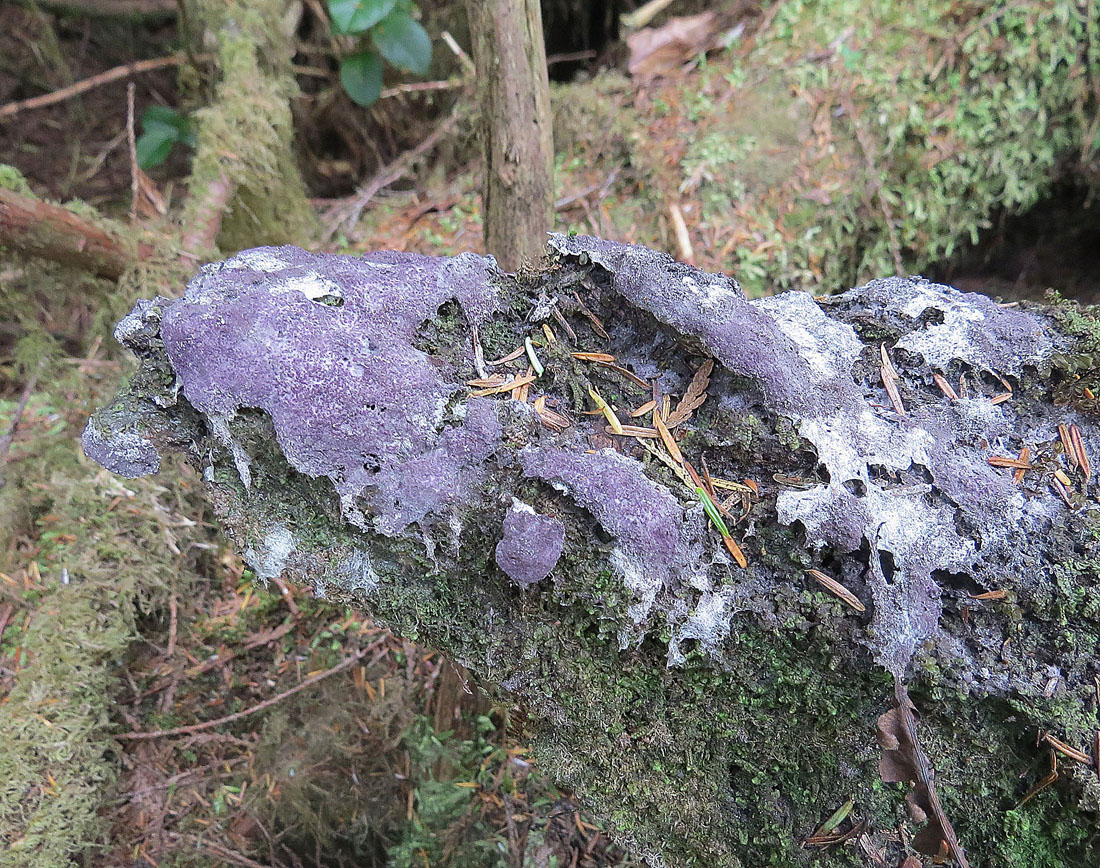
- Nectriopsis violacea growing parasitically on the slime mold Fuligo septica

Scientific classification
- Kingdom: Fungi
- Division: Ascomycota
- Class: Sordariomycetes
- Order: Hypocreales
- Family: Bionectriaceae; Samuels & Rossman (1999)

Type genus
- Bionectria Speg. (1919)

Genera
- See text

= Bionectriaceae =

Family of fungi

The Bionectriaceae are a family of fungi in the order Hypocreales. A 2008 estimate places 35 genera and 281 species in the family. Species in the family tend to grow on plant material, including woody debris, while some species associate with algae, bryophytes, or other fungi.

== History ==
Bionectriaceae was introduced by Rossman et al. (1999) to accommodate 26 genera. It has been revised and refined by several studies based on phylogenetic analyses (Rossman et al. 2001; Maharachchikumbura et al. 2015, 2016; Wijayawardene et al. 2018). The 2022 treatment of Bionectriaceae was provided by Wijayawardene et al. with the acceptance of 47 genera.

== Genera ==
This is a list of the genera in the Bionectriaceae, based on a 2022 review and summary of fungal classification by Wijayawardene and colleagues. Following the genus name is the taxonomic authority (those who first circumscribed the genus; standardized author abbreviations are used), year of publication, and the number of species:

- Acremonium Link (1809) – ca. 150
- Anthonectria Döbbeler (2010) – 1 sp.
- Aphanotria Döbbeler (2007) – 1 sp.
- Battarrina (Sacc.) Clem. & Shear (1931) – 1 sp.
- Bryocentria Döbbeler (2004) – 15 spp.
- Bryotria Döbbeler & P.G.Davison (2017) – 2 spp.
- Bullanockia Crous (2016) – 1 sp.
- Chrysonectria Lechat & J.Fourn. (2018) – 1 sp.
- Clibanites (P.Karst.) P.Karst. (1871) – 1 sp.
- Clonostachys Corda (1839) – 78 spp.
- Dimerosporiella Speg. (1908) – 8 spp.
- Fusariella Sacc. (1884) – 17 spp.
- Geonectria Lechat & J.Fourn. (2018) – 1 sp.
- Geosmithia Pitt (1979) – 24 spp.
- Gliomastix Guég. (1905) – 24 spp.
- Globonectria Etayo (2002) – 1 sp.
- Gracilistilbella Seifert (2000) – 4 spp.
- Halonectria E.B.G.Jones (1965) – 1 sp.
- Heleococcum C.A.Jørg. (1922) – 5 spp.
- Hydropisphaera Dumort. (1822) – 29 spp.
- Ijuhya Starbäck (1889) – 22 spp.
- Kallichroma Kohlm. & Volkm.-Kohlm. (1993) – 4 spp.
- Lasionectria (Sacc.) Cooke (1884) – 23 spp.
- Mycoarachis Malloch & Cain (1970) – 2 spp.
- Mycocitrus A.Møller (1901) – 3 spp.
- Nectriella Nitschke ex Fuckel (1870) – 84 spp.
- Nectriopsis Maire (1911) – 70 spp.
- Ochronectria Rossman & Samuels (1999) – 3 spp.
- Ovicuculispora Etayo (2010) – 2 spp.
- Paranectria Sacc. (1878) – 4 spp.
- Periantria Döbbeler & P.G.Davison (2017) – 2 spp.
- Peristomialis (W.Phillips) Boud. (1907) – 6 spp.
- Pronectria Clem. (1931) – 44 spp.
- Protocreopsis Yoshim.Doi (1977) – 12 spp.
- Roumegueriella Speg. (1880) – 4 spp.
- Selinia P.Karst. (1876) – 6 spp.
- Septofusidium W. Gams (1971) – 5 spp.
- Stephanonectria Schroers & Samuels (1999) – 1 sp.
- Stilbocrea Pat. (1900) – 7 spp.
- Stromatonectria Jaklitsch & Voglmayr (2011) – 1 sp.
- Synnemellisia N.K.Rao, Manohar. & Goos (1989) – 2 spp.
- Trichonectria Kirschst. (1906) – 19 spp.
- Verrucostoma Hirooka, Tak.Kobay. & P.Chaverri (2010) – 2 spp.
- Xanthonectria J.Fourn. & P.-A.Moreau (2016) – 1 sp.
