= TcNPR3 (gene) =

Gene found in the plant Theobroma cacao

TcNPR3 (Theobroma cacao Non-Expressor of Pathogenesis-Related 3) is a gene found in the genome of the plant Theobroma cacao that reduces the effectiveness of its immune response, including NPR1-mediated defense response, against pathogens such as Pseudomonas syringae, Phytophthora megakarya, Phytophthora tropicalis and various species of Agrobacterium. It can be mutated within the plant's genome using CRISPR-Cas9, allowing more effective immune response.
