= Black pod disease =

Disease of cocoa trees

- Common names: Black pod disease of cocoa
- Causal agents: Phytophthora palmivora Phytophthora megakarya
- Hosts: cocoa (Theobroma cacao)
- EPPO Code: PHYTPL

Black pod disease is a disease of cocoa trees. It is mostly found in tropical areas where cocoa trees grow, and its spores are spread via the heavy rainfalls that can occur in tropical climates. Annually, the pathogen can cause a yield loss of up to 1/3, and up to 10% of total trees can be lost completely.

The pathogen can be found anywhere on the cocoa trees, but is most notable for the black mummified appearance it gives to the fruit of the cocoa tree. Preventing the spread of the pathogen prior to infection is the best means of control. The pathogen can be greatly reduced if leaf litter is allowed to stay on the ground, otherwise, chemical control can be used for more severe cases.

== Disease cycle, symptoms and signs ==
The symptom of black pod disease is a necrotic lesion on the cocoa pod that is brown or black in color, which eventually enlarges to cover the whole pod. White mycelia growth on lesions that appear several days after infection is a sign of the causal pathogen of black pod disease, which is Phytophthora spp.

Black pod disease starts when the infected pod shows some little yellow spots, which eventually turn brown and enlarge to a dark brown or black lesion within five days. The lesion is fast growing and covers the entire pod after eight days of infection. The infection does not only occur on the pod surface, but also invades inside the pod affecting the beans. The growth of white mycelia on the black pod is visible after 11 days and the sporulation is initiated. The dispersal of sporangia or zoospores through water, ants and other insects occurs at this stage and will infect other healthy pods nearby. Direct contact of a black pod with healthy pods also leads to the spread of disease. In addition, the infected flower cushion and mummified pods are the locations for P. palmivora survival during the dry season, where the pathogen will grow and continue to infect other developing pods The infection occurs at any stage of pod development, where it causes wilting and dying of young pods and destroyed the beans of mature pods. The fully infected pods (the mummified pod), which then become dehydrated, are capable of providing the inoculum of P. palmivora for at least 3 years. P. megakarya causes the same symptom as P. palmivora, but the occurrence is faster and generally produces greater amount of spores. Both P. palmivora and P. megakarya also caused canker on bark, flower cushion and chupóns, and cankers on the base could extend to the main roots. Cankers were identified as one of the inoculum sources for black pod disease. Furthermore, the pattern of infection caused by P. megakarya starts from the ground and moves up to the canopy, however there is no distinct pattern of disease infection caused by P. palmivora was reported. This pattern of infection could be due to P. megakarya and P. palmivora that were found to survive in soil and P. megakarya could be surviving in the roots of a few species of shade trees found in cocoa plantations.

== Hosts ==
Black pod disease, while its name indicates that it is found in Theobroma cacao, also has different hosts. For example, P. megakarya has been detected in the roots of shade trees of Western Africa. While these trees can also be affected by the pathogen it is because of the market value of the cocoa trees that all emphasis and research on the disease is done on cocoa trees.

=== Cocoa trees ===
In the cocoa trees, P. megakarya infects the bark, flowers, and trees with cankers. These cankers will often exude a reddish gum reducing the life of the tree, in turn, reducing the yield of the plant. The most devastating place the pathogen attacks is in the flowers, as these flowers are where the cocoa fruit will set. An infected flower will produce infected fruit, which will turn black and be unsuitable for processing.

== Pathogen ==
Seven different pathogens have been named to cause black pod disease across world. All of the pathogens are found in the genus Phytophthora (a plant-damaging Oomycetes). The seven species responsible for black pod disease are; P. capsici, P. citrophthora, P. megasperma, P. katsurae, P. palmivora, and P. megakarya. While all of these pathogens can cause black pod disease, the two major pathogens responsible for black pod are P. palmivora and P. megakarya. P. capsici and P. citrophthora are found in Central and South America, while others such as P. megakarya is found in Central and Western Africa.

== Environment ==
P. megakarya is found in Central and Western Africa. During the cooler wetter times of the year, there is a spike in the incidents of black pod disease as when compared to the hotter more dry times of the year. The disease has a spike in growth shortly after a rainfall. The humid weather that is associated with this pathogen and all other black pod disease pathogens is needed as the sporangia forms and starts distributing spores through rainfall, splashing water, and running water.

== Inoculum dispersal ==
=== Soil and litter ===
The spread of infection to pods above bare soil was shown to be greater relative to pods above litter. The reason for this is due to the splash of rain from bare soil spreads the inoculum to pods. However, litter under the tree prevented water droplets from splashing the soil particles as well as the inoculum beneath the litter to the above pods. Furthermore, it was also reported that pods near the ground showed greater infections compared to higher pods due to greater soil was splashed and stick on the lower pods, therefore causes more infections.

=== Air and water dispersal from sporulating pods ===
The spread of spores through air from infected pods was observed, and some assumptions regarding this mechanism of dispersion has been made in previous studies, however it has remained uncertain due to unreliable results from an experiment that collected some spores in the air using the volumetric spore trap, where a small amount of spores were found in the trap - most likely due to realative humidity capturing the spores in micrometer sized droplets suspended in the air. Conversely, the dispersal of inoculum via rain is considered an effective mechanism in spreading the inoculum. It was assumed that under close canopy, less water will reach the sporulating pods to spread the inoculum, however, rain drops from leaves and branches could also splash the inoculum to the surroundings. Infected pods lying on the ground or litter could also spread the inoculum, yet greater infection was observed on pods located under infected pods hanging on the tree compared to pods at the same level of infected pods. It was reported that splash of wind-blown droplets from the infected pods are also able to infect pods on different trees nearby

=== Invertebrate ===
The dispersal of the disease is also associated with the invertebrate vectors. Tent building ants such as Crematogaster striatula and Camponotus acvapimensis were reported as the primary vector in disseminating the spores of P. palmivora from infected pods to healthy pods in Ghana. C. striatula was thought to be the most important vector that is responsible for black pod losses due to its building tent behavior as well as its dominancy within the area under particular condition. In Ghana, C. striatula removes the outer layer of cocoa pod and uses this material to construct the tent. Therefore, this ant effectively spread the disease by transporting the spores from the infected pods on the ground or on trees to healthy pods. Several other ant species namely C. africana, C. clariventris and C. depressa were also responsible for the spread of the disease besides C. striatula In addition, Camponotus acvapimensis, another type of tent-building ant that uses soil as building materials for tent construction was identified as the most important agent to spread the inoculum in Nigeria. Soil was identified as the source of inoculum for P. megakarya and therefore, it was implied that this ant species might use the infected soil to build tents, which infects healthy pods on trees.

Other invertebrates that were reported to be associated with spreading the disease are several species of beetle, snail, caterpillar and millipedes. Fecal samples from these organisms were found to contain viable spores of P. palmivora. It was reported that beetle of family Nitidulidae is the most common vector for black pod as it was found 50 to 60% of black pod occurrences. These invertebrates consume the outer layer of the infected pods and incidentally ingest the mycelium and spores of the pathogen, thus spread the pathogen to other healthy pods.

== Disease management ==
There are several methods available in order to control black pod disease such as cultural, chemical and biological control. In addition, the cultivation of varieties that resistant to black pod is an alternative in order to reduce disease incidence.

=== Cultural control ===
Several cultural practices to manage black pod disease could be implemented in cocoa plantation. A spacing of 3.1 x 3.1m and pruning of trees are recommended for cocoa planting in order to allow more light and air flow around the trees. This will reduce the level of humidity that is causing black pod disease. The removal of pods with black pod symptom should also be done in favor to eliminate the source of inoculum. In another study, the utilization of litter mulch under cocoa plantation has been reported in Papua New Guinea, which has some negative effect on the population of P. palmivora, and therefore could reduce the pod infection especially at the beginning of raining season. Leaf litter showed rapid decline in pathogen recovery of colonized cocoa tissue after 18 weeks, relative to grass ground cover. An explanation for this is due to higher moisture content and microbial activity of other microbes under leaf litter that reduces the survival of Phytophthora cinnamomi as documented by Aryantha et al. (2000). More frequent ripe pod harvest (i.e. twice a week) and removal of infected pod on the ground was demonstrated to significantly reduced disease occurrence and improve pod yield compared to less frequent harvest and removal (i.e. once a month). In addition, scattered healthy pod on the ground should also be removed, as it will be infected and become the source of inoculum later. Sanitation is one cultural method to control for black pod disease. Sanitation practices include weed removal, pruning, thinning and removal of infected and mummified pods every two weeks in order to eliminate the source for inoculum. Phytosanitary pod removal was observed to significantly reduce disease occurrences by 9–11% to 22–31%, where this practice removes the source for secondary inoculum. However, increase in disease incidence after raining season was observed to be most likely due to the spread of inoculum from survival site by the rain. The application of fungicide following sanitation is commonly performed for an effective control of disease, as sanitation practice alone would not eliminate the source of inoculum and still causes greater black pod incident compared to sanitation followed by at least one fungicide application

=== Chemical control ===
The application of copper fungicide has been shown to significantly reduce the number of black pod incidents in Nigeria. Metalaxyl (Ridomil) and cuprous oxide (Perenox) were identified to be successful in increasing the number of harvested healthy pod compared to the application of fosetyl aluminium (Aliete) and control treatment. On top of that, the timing of fungicide application has some positive effect on the final pod yield where this plot produced greater yield than the unsprayed plot. The application was done before August, which is before the main disease epidemic that usually occurs in September and October. The recommended standard for fungicide application to control black pod disease caused by P. megakarya for a season is 6 to 8 times of application in every 3–4 weeks. However, the adoption of recommended application was very low among farmers in Ghana. Therefore, an experiment with a reduced number of fungicide applications demonstrated that there was 25 to 45% reduction in disease incidence. In terms of disease control and yields, sanitation and three applications of Ridomil 72 plus (12% metalaxyl + 60% copper-1-oxide) fungicide showed a better control compared to sanitation alone and sanitation with one or two fungicide applications. However, reduced in fungicide application was shown to be significantly less effective than the recommended standard fungicide application. It was suggested that the understanding regarding the source of inoculum, the amount of infective inoculum production and how the disease is disseminated is important in order to identify the appropriate and economical method in fungicide application as well as for an effective control of the disease. For example, the application of fungicide on the trunk will help farmers to control the spread of the disease up in the canopy, as it is difficult to reach the canopy during fungicide application. This will eventually save more time, labor and cost for disease management.

=== Cultural and chemical control ===
In Ghana, a study that combined the sanitation and fungicide application showed a significant reduction in the percentage of disease incidence, where greater black pod incident were observed from pods on the trunk than the canopy in control treatment (no fungicide application). This suggested that the application of fungicide on the trunk would protect pods from infection, therefore reduce primary and secondary infection rate, both on the trunk and in the canopy. In addition, the application of systemic (potassium phosphonate) with one and double injection (20 ml and 40 ml of fungicide for each injection frequency), and semi-systemic (metalaxyl) fungicide showed better control compared to contact fungicides (copper based fungicide) in both locations that were used in the experiment.

=== Biological control ===
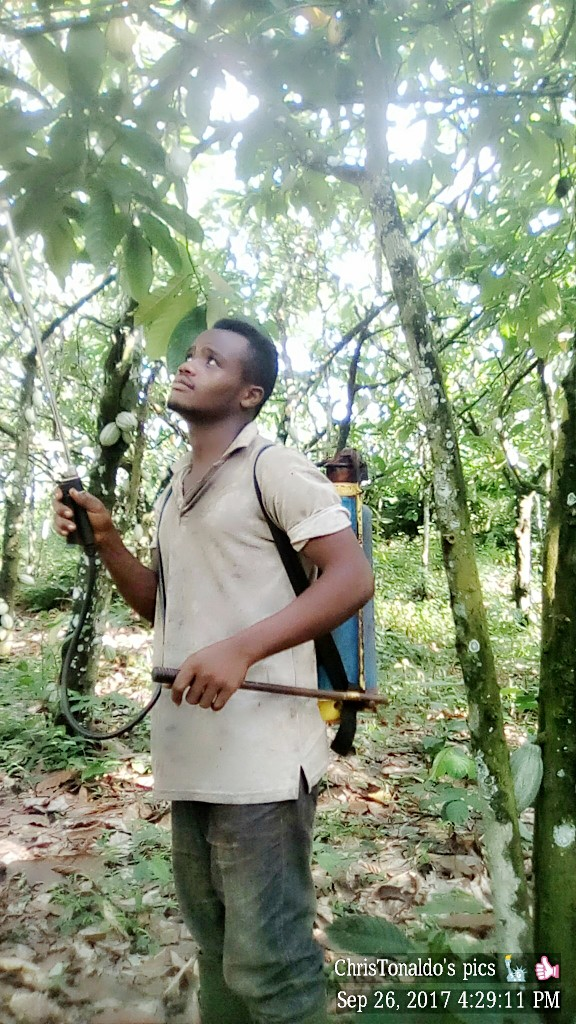
Chris Tonaldo applying chemical fungicide on cocoa

Heavy application of chemical fungicide eventually leads to resistance in pathogens and causes soil and water pollution. Hence, more sustainable and environmental friendly method should be established and implemented, such as biological control. Several species of fungi from the genera of Trichoderma were identified to be beneficial endophytes to control black pod caused by Phytophthora spp. An isolate of Trichoderma asperellum from soil was observed as a potential mycoparasite for P. megakarya where this fungus has the potential to reduce black pod incidence under field conditions in Cameroon. It was reported that moderate black pod cases (47%) occurred in the T. asperellum treatment compared to untreated trees (71%) and chemical fungicide (1.73%). Another species, T. virens, also has been documented to reduce black pod incidence in Peru. In Brazil, a new species known as Trichoderma martiale Samuels, sp. nov. was identified as an endophyte on cocoa, which has the ability to reduce black pod symptoms caused by P. megakarya. This endophyte species survives on cocoa pods, and has the ability to establish a long endophytic association with the host (about 3.5 months). Nevertheless, the protection against black pod via biological control is not as effective as the control using chemical fungicides.

=== Resistant variety ===
There is no variety of cocoa that shows resistance to Phytophthora infection, and the establishment and utilization of resistant varieties most likely depends on the region. Numerous breeding programs have been established worldwide in order to screen and test local hybrids for resistance to Phytophthora spp. For example, a study in Cameroon assessed the performance of local cocoa cultivars (the southern and northern Cameroon cultivar) compared to the local and international gene bank cultivars. The local genebank cultivar consisted of F1 hybrid of Upper Amazon X Trinidad, and an international cultivar from Papua New Guinea and Latin America were provided through International Cocoa Genebank, Trinidad. Based on the information provided by farmers and leaf disc tests to assess resistance, the local cultivars selected from farmers field showed greater resistance to P. megakarya compared to others. Thus, it was concluded that there are some potentially resistant varieties available in this area. In addition, further work towards developing black pod-resistant varieties is being done by CEPLAC (Executive Plan of Cocoa Farming) agency in Brazil.
