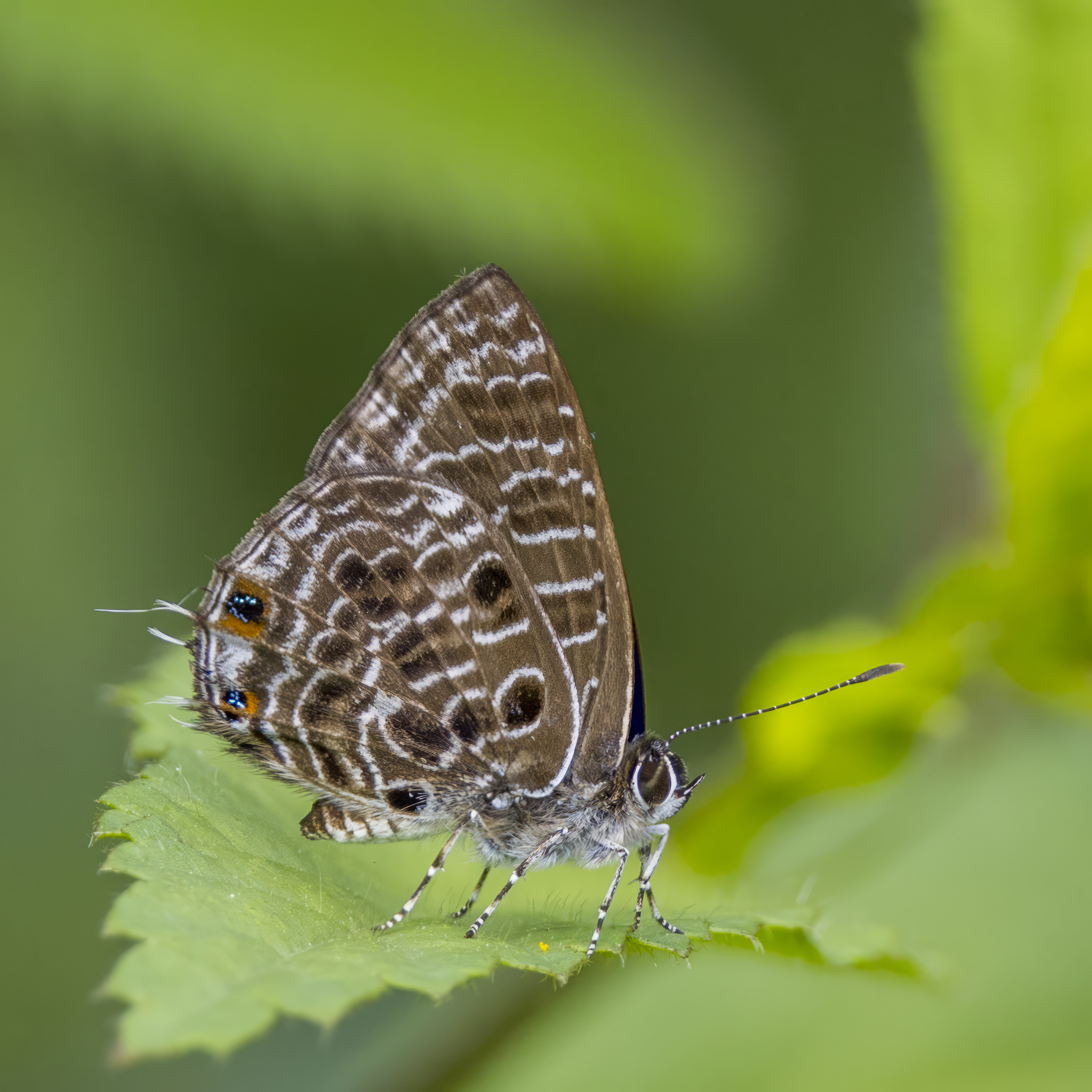
- Both males in Ghana

Conservation status
- Least Concern (IUCN 3.1)

Scientific classification
- Kingdom: Animalia
- Phylum: Arthropoda
- Clade: Pancrustacea
- Class: Insecta
- Order: Lepidoptera
- Family: Lycaenidae
- Genus: Anthene
- Species: A. larydas

Binomial name
- Anthene larydas (Cramer, 1780)

Synonyms
- Papilio larydas Cramer, 1780; Anthene (Anthene) larydas; Hesperia perides Fabricius, 1793

= Anthene larydas =

Species of butterfly

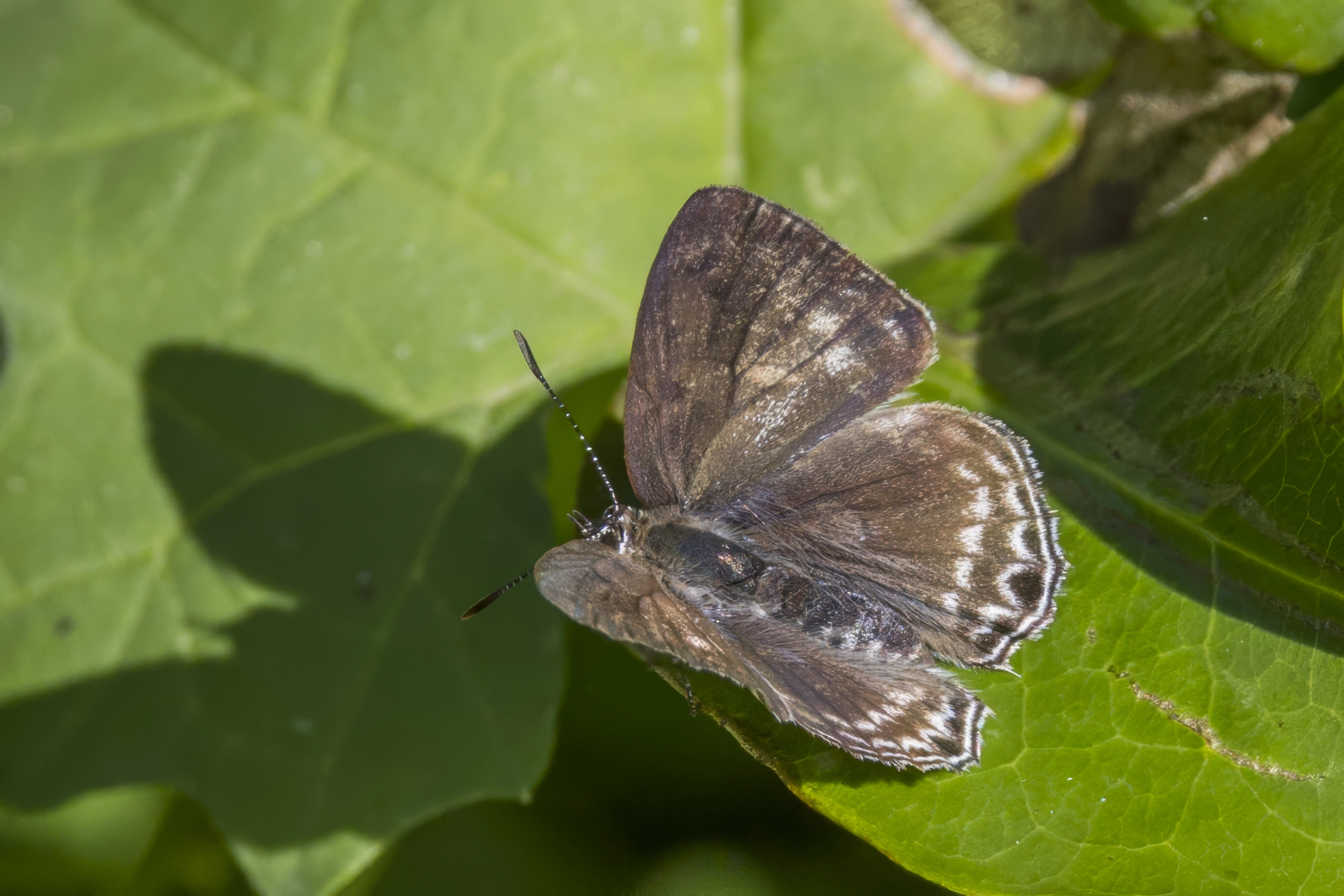
female, Mozambique

Anthene larydas, the spotted hairtail or common ciliate blue, is a butterfly in the family Lycaenidae. It is found in Senegal, the Gambia, Guinea-Bissau, Guinea, Burkina Faso, Liberia, Sierra Leone, Ivory Coast, Ghana, Nigeria, Cameroon, the Republic of the Congo, the Central African Republic, the Democratic Republic of the Congo, Uganda, western Kenya to South Africa and Mozambique.

The larvae feed on Acacia farnesiana, Afzelia species, Albizia gummifera, Albizia zygia, Dichrostachys glomerata and Hypericum species. They are associated with the ant species Pheidole aurivillii race kasaiensis, Camponotus akwapimensis var. poultoni and Crematogaster striatula var. horati.

Torben Larsen developed a species numbering system for his 2005 publication Butterflies of West Africa. This species is #523. The 'Larsen' numbers have since been used with permission in A Sharp Eye on Butterflies of Ghana.
