= Phytophthora megakarya =

Scientific classification
- Domain: Eukaryota
- Clade: Sar
- Clade: Stramenopiles
- Division: Oomycota
- Class: Peronosporomycetes
- Order: Peronosporales
- Family: Peronosporaceae
- Genus: Phytophthora
- Species: P. megakarya

Binomial name
- Phytophthora megakarya Brasier & M.J. Griffin

Species of single-celled organism

Phytophthora megakarya is an oomycete plant pathogen that causes black pod disease in cocoa trees in west and central Africa. This pathogen can cause detrimental loss of yield in the economically important cocoa industry, worth approximately $70 billion annually. It can damage any part of the tree, causing total yield losses which can easily reach 20-25%. A mixture of chemical and cultural controls, as well as choosing resistant plant varieties, are often necessary to control this pathogen.

== Hosts and symptoms ==
Phytophthora megakarya's only known host is Theobroma cacao, or the cocoa tree, located in West and Central Africa. It is considered to be the most virulent species of Phytophthora which infects T. cacao, causing the greatest percentage of yield loss. This pathogen causes black pod disease which produces an array of symptoms throughout the host’s life cycle.

Phytophthora megakarya is a facultative parasite that can infect any part of the cacao tree at any time under optimal environmental conditions. Trees as young as seedlings may show symptoms of infection such as blight or root rot. Bark wounds, called cankers, can form on stems and branches as a result of disease. Infected cocoa pods rot and turn black, providing insight on the origin of the disease name. Other symptoms that may occur include damping off, dieback, lesions, mummification, premature drop, soft rot, and shriveling. The process of infection by P. megakarya is quite rapid. Small translucent spots on the pod can be seen 2 to 3 days after infection. Whitish spores can be seen growing on these spots 3 to 5 days following their emergence. The spots will grow and darken in color until eventually the entire pod turns black and becomes mummified. In more advanced stages, the pathogen may take over the internal tissues and cause the cocoa beans to become warped. P. megakarya also readily forms stem cankers that are usually confined to the lower part of the tree, but may be present anywhere on the tree. Canker lesions may extend beneath the soil surface, providing a source of primary inoculum.

Phytophthora megakarya can be distinguished from other Phytophthora species by its production of gametangia. These gametangia have large nuclei containing five to six chromosomes and sporangia growing off of medium-length stalks.

== Disease cycle ==
Phytophthora megakarya is an oomycete that has a polycyclic disease cycle, producing three asexual spore types: sporangia, zoospores, and chlamydospores. Although it is rare, P. megakarya can also produce sexual oospores through heterothallic mating which requires two different mating types; so far none have been observed. Mycelium plays an important role in the infection of the cocoa trees; mycelium found in the soil and in cankers on the bark develops into sporangia, which can then germinate. Zoospores are produced from these sporangia as secondary inoculum. They may infect the plant either directly or indirectly depending on the availability of water. A direct infection by the zoospore results in the production of more mycelia, which may develop into sporangia capable of releasing more inoculum or chlamydospores. Chlamydospores serve as survival structures for P. megakarya, in some instances surviving as long as 18 months. An indirect infection results in the formation of encysted spores in the absence of water; mycelium production occurs after germination of these spores.

P. megakarya depends heavily on the correct environmental conditions to cause disease. Primary infections usually occur in June, however, disease peaks between August and October. Under humid conditions a single pod may produce up to 4 million sporangia. These sporangia can be dispersed by rain, movement of planting materials, insects, rodents, and contaminated harvesting tools.

== Pathogenesis ==
Not much is known about the pathogenesis of P. megakarya. Like all oomycetes, zoospores produced by P. megakarya need free water on plant surfaces in order to encyst, germinate, and penetrate host tissues. For the pathogen to enter a plant cell, the effector protein of the pathogen must attach itself to the binding protein of the plant, thereby getting carried into the cell. A germ tube is formed during germination of the zoospore which typically gives rise to an appressorium. These structures penetrate the epidermal cells of the plant’s tissue and form haustoria. Haustoria invade the plant intracellularly to retrieve nutrients while further dispersing the pathogen within the host. Chlamydospores that survive in the soil produce mycelia that can also infect plant structures. Infections of stems and branches lead to the formation of cankers while infections on cocoa pods cause pod rot. The development of cankers has also been associated with insects that burrow into the bark of cocoa trees.

== Environment ==
Phytophthora spp. occur wherever cocoa is grown and is the most economically detrimental pathogen of cocoa in West Africa where the two species P. megakarya and P. palmivora dominate. West Africa’s environment is characterized by a dry season from November until February. During this time, moisture-laden air from the equator moves in, providing ideal moisture conditions for the growth of both cocoa trees and P. megakarya. Cocoa is known to grow well in countries that occur in the subhumid zone, primarily in the forested areas of the countries. The forested regions of West Africa near the equator receive 1500mm to 2000mm of rain; cocoa is planted in these areas where the forest is cleared. Since P. megakarya favors wet conditions, these forested regions are ideal during the wet seasons. P. megakarya survives in the soil during elongated dry periods. When the conditions are right, zoospores swim toward the surface of the soil where a fine aerosol is produced in the presence of water to transport the spores to the pods. In comparison to P. palmivora, P. megakarya is able to produce greater quantities of inoculum more quickly and can distribute it earlier in the season; thus it may infect more pods in a shorter time than P. palmivora.

== Management ==
=== Chemical control ===
Chemical control is often necessary to conserve yield, although it can come at a very high price. Chemical control targets the initial inoculum, reducing the amount of mycelium and sporangia present. In west Africa chemicals are applied using spray tanks. Fungicides such as copper oxychloride, Mancozeb, and Metalaxyl+Mancozeb are typically used. Mixtures of these chemicals can be used to prevent the pathogen from acquiring resistance to certain chemical compounds. Many of these fungicides contain heavy metals which can be damaging to the environment. Spraying is recommended 4-6 times a year from the last week of May to the end of the growing period. Overuse of chemicals will result in increasing amounts of heavy metals being absorbed into the environment.

=== Cultural control ===
Cultural practices not only reduce the incidence of disease but also allow for better use of chemical control. If the disease is not causing much damage, cultural control alone may be sufficient. Removal of infected plant parts reduces sporangial inoculum and is an effective cultural control. Weeding reduces the humidity of the surrounding air which is unfavorable for the production of sporangia. Frequently harvesting the pods reduces the amount of sporangial inoculum. Another form of cultural control is the burning of the pod husk piles to destroy additional sources of chlamydospores and sporangia. These cultural practices can limit disease caused by P. megakarya significantly.

=== Biological control ===
In certain regions of Africa, Trichoderma asperellum is used as a biological control agent. It is applied as a wettable powder, containing cassava flour and T. asperellum. Though this method has shown positive results, the formulation is not practical for such a wet, tropical region. Research is being done into examining different formulations that can more effectively be applied.

=== Genetic resistance ===
Choosing a resistant variety of plant is an effective method of minimizing the damage of P. megakarya. Breeding for resistance for either P. palmivora or P. megakarya will increase the plant's resistance to both pathogens simultaneously. Much of the current research into P. megakarya and black pod disease is looking at the cellular processes involved in infection. Through the examination and understanding of these processes, researchers can alter the genetic makeup of T. cacao trees in hopes of more effectively controlling the spread of black pod disease. Growing a cocoa variety with resistance can also increase the effectiveness of chemical applications. Resistance will also reduce the quantity of infectious plants, thereby reducing the amount of cultural control required.

== Importance ==
Phytophthora megakarya is the most important cocoa pathogen in central and west Africa. It is endemic to Cameroon, Nigeria, and Ghana and is present as an invasive pathogen in Côte d'Ivoire. These countries account for four of the top ten world producers of cocoa, Côte d'Ivoire being the number one producer worldwide. In some cases, when left untreated, the pathogen has led to an 80% loss of cocoa pods. However, the infection may not always be localized on the pods. Cankers formed on the bark of the cocoa trees lead to a reduction of tree vigor and total yield, and in extreme cases, result in a 10% loss of trees annually. As the trees age pod production decreases; warnings of chocolate shortages as soon as 2020 have been predicted based on the combination of these factors.
