= Fosetyl-Al =

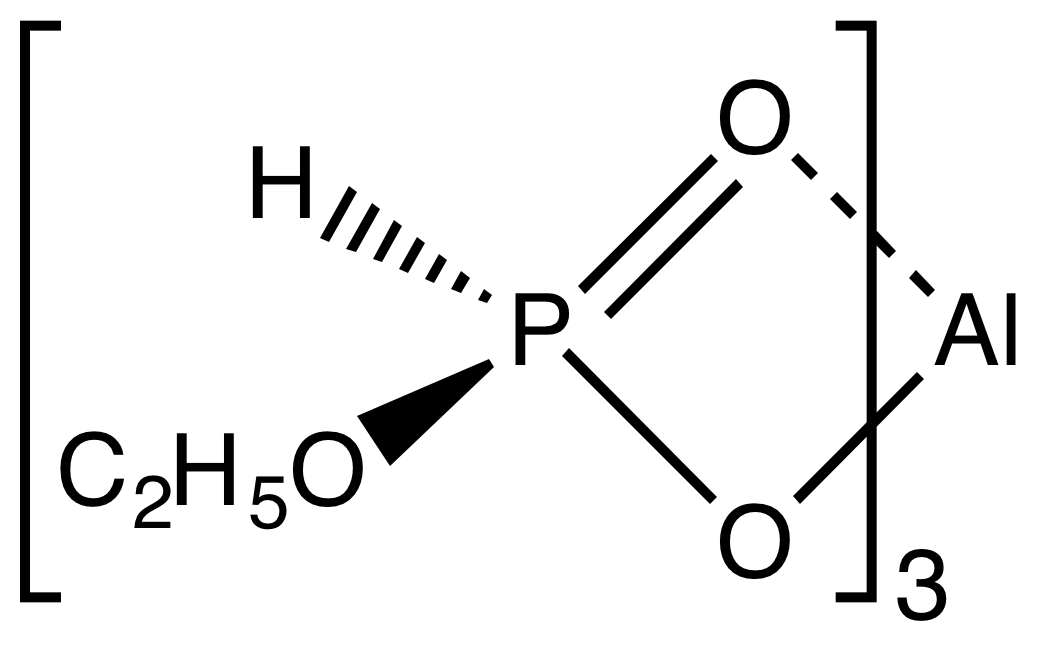

Names
- Other names Fosetyl-aluminum; Aluminum tris(ethyl phosphite), Aliette, Fullstop

Identifiers
CAS Number	39148-24-8
3D model (JSmol)	Interactive image
ChEBI	CHEBI:84033
ChemSpider	4886546
EC Number	254-320-2
PubChem CID	6328269
UNII	3979UH4J7X
- InChI: InChI=1S/3C2H5O3P.Al/c3*1-2-5-6(3)4;/h3*2H2,1H3;/q;;;+3 Key: OIPMQULDKWSNGX-UHFFFAOYSA-N
- SMILES: CCOP(=O)=O.CCOP(=O)=O.CCOP(=O)=O.[Al+3]

Properties
Chemical formula	C_{6}H_{18}AlO_{9}P_{3}
Molar mass	354.104 g·mol^{−1}
Appearance	White or colorless solid
Density	1.53 g/cm^{3}
Melting point	215 °C (419 °F; 488 K) (decomp.)

Hazards
- GHS labelling
Pictograms	(GHS05: Corrosive)
Signal word	Danger
Hazard statements	H318
Precautionary statements	P280, P305+P351+P338, P310
- Except where otherwise noted, data are given for materials in their standard state (at 25 °C [77 °F], 100 kPa). Infobox references

Fosetyl-Al is an organophosphorus compound that is used as a fungicide. With the formula [C_{2}H_{5}OP(H)O_{2}]_{3}Al. It is derived from ethylphosphite.
