= Crematogaster striatula =

Scientific classification
- Kingdom: Animalia
- Phylum: Arthropoda
- Clade: Pancrustacea
- Class: Insecta
- Order: Hymenoptera
- Family: Formicidae
- Subfamily: Myrmicinae
- Genus: Crematogaster
- Species: C. striatula

Binomial name
- Crematogaster striatula Emery, 1892

Species of ant

Crematogaster striatula is a species of ant in the genus Crematogaster. It is arboreal and native to Africa.

== Defensive strategy ==
One way this ant stands apart from other species is that when an enemy insect is in its territory, it secretes an airborne chemical from its stinger that calls reinforcements to its location that surround the enemy, stingers out. The chemical eventually paralyzes the insect, and its body is dragged back to the colony.
