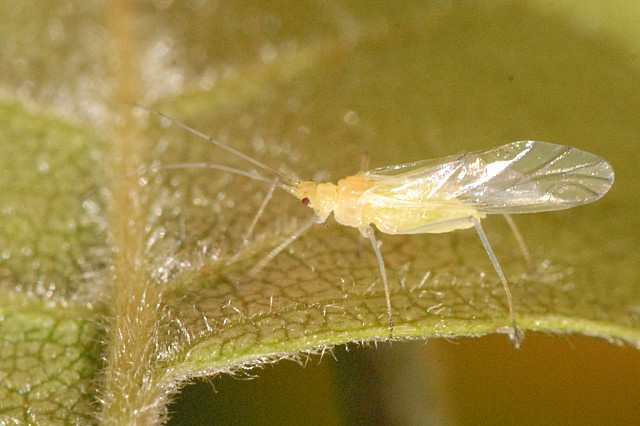
- Calaphis flava, Yellow dark-veined birch aphid

Scientific classification
- Domain: Eukaryota
- Kingdom: Animalia
- Phylum: Arthropoda
- Class: Insecta
- Order: Hemiptera
- Suborder: Sternorrhyncha
- Infraorder: Aphidomorpha
- Superfamily: Aphidoidea
- Family: Aphididae
- Subfamily: Calaphidinae; Oestlund, 1919

Tribes
- Calaphidini; Panaphidini

= Calaphidinae =

Subfamily of true bugs

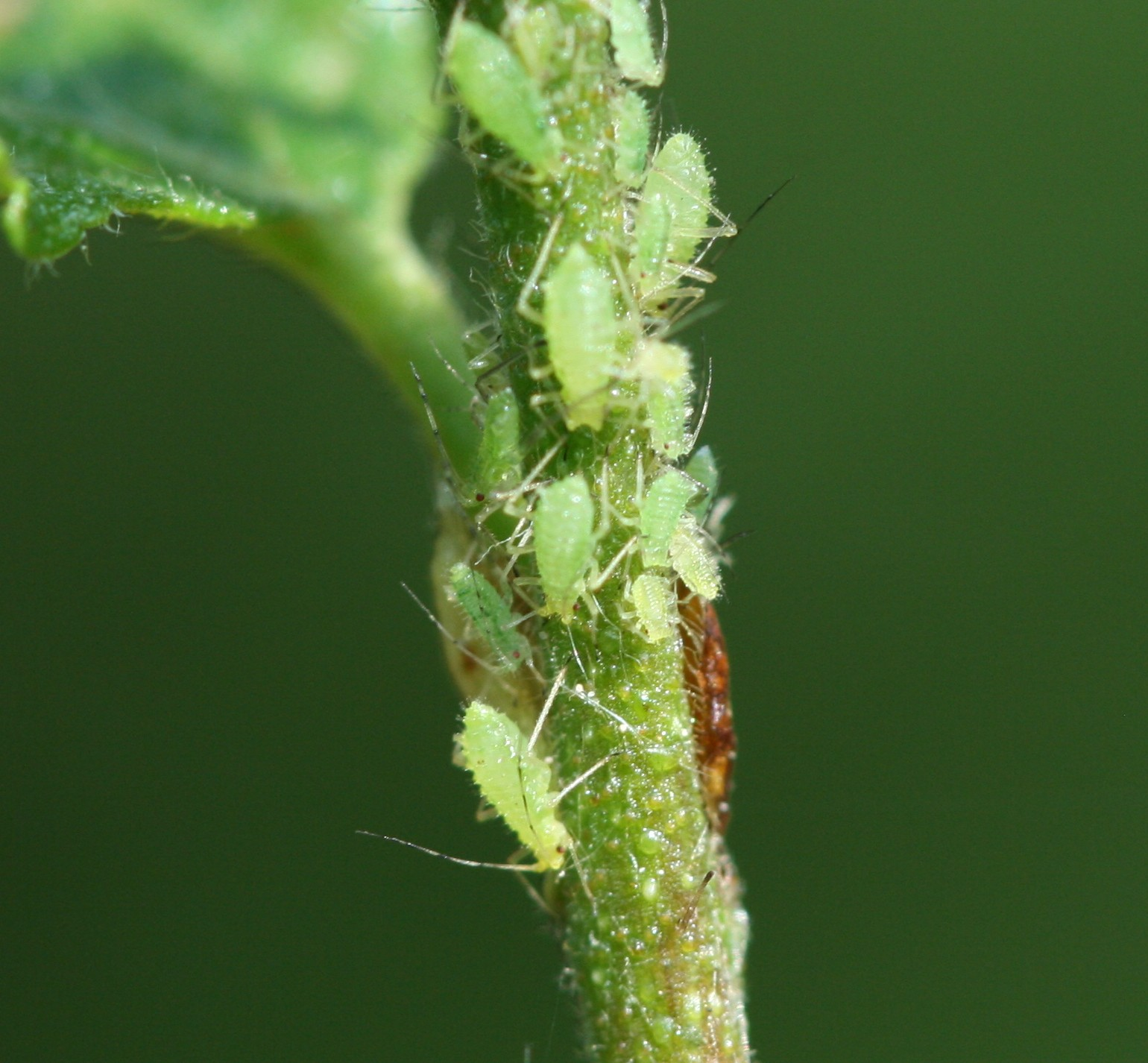
Calaphis flava

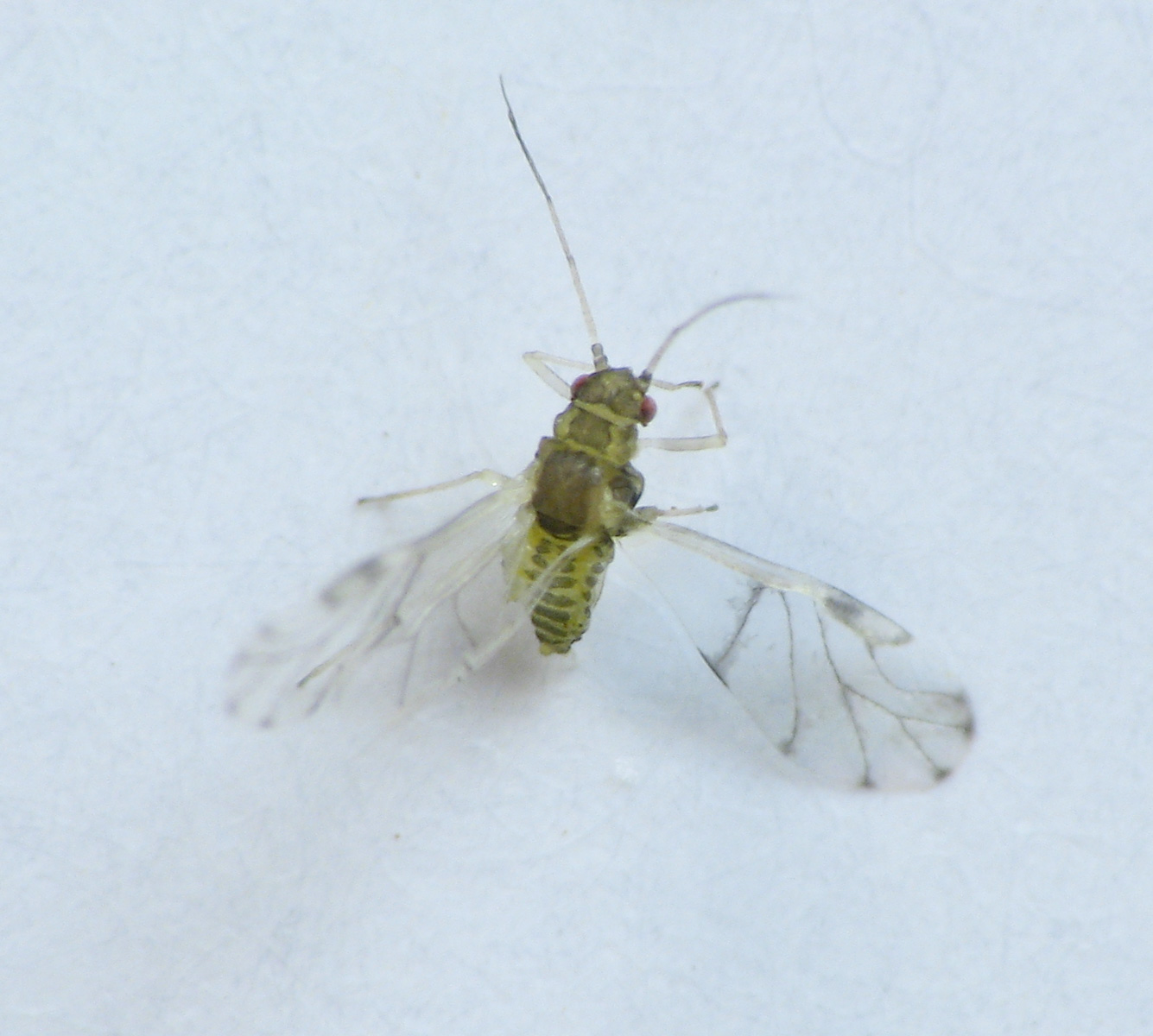
Myzocallis asclepiadis, winged adult

Calaphidinae is a subfamily of aphids in the family Aphididae. There are more than 60 genera and 360 described species in Calaphidinae.

== Genera ==
These 63 genera belong to the subfamily Calaphidinae:

- Andorracallis Quednau, 1999
- Appendiseta Richards, 1965
- Apulicallis Barbagallo & Patti, 1991
- Betacallis Matsumura, 1919
- Betulaphis Glendenning, 1926
- Bicaudella Rusanova, 1943
- Boernerina Bramstedt, 1940
- Calaphis Walsh, 1863
- Callipterinella van der Goot, 1913
- Cepegillettea Granovsky, 1928
- Chromaphis Walker, 1870
- Chromocallis Takahashi, 1961
- Chuansicallis Tao, 1963
- Chucallis Tao, 1963
- Clethrobius Mordvilko, 1928
- Cranaphis Takahashi, 1939
- Crypturaphis Silvestri, 1935
- Ctenocallis Klodnitsky, 1924
- Dasyaphis Takahashi, 1938
- Eucallipterus Schouteden, 1906
- Euceraphis Walker, 1870
- Hannabura Matsumura, 1917
- Hoplocallis Pintera, 1952
- Hoplochaetaphis Aizenberg, 1959
- Hoplochaitophorus Granovsky, 1933
- Indiochaitophorus Verma, 1970
- Lachnochaitophorus Granovsky, 1933
- Latgerina Remaudière, 1981
- Melanocallis Oestlund, 1923
- Mesocallis Matsumura, 1919
- Mexicallis Remaudière, 1982
- Monaphis Walker, 1870
- Monellia Oestlund, 1887
- Monelliopsis Richards, 1965 (pecan aphids)
- Myzocallis Passerini, 1860
- Neobetulaphis Basu, 1964
- Neochromaphis Takahashi, 1921
- Neocranaphis
- Neosymydobius Baker, 1920
- Oestlundiella Granovsky, 1930
- Panaphis Kirkaldy, 1904
- Patchia Baker, 1920
- Phyllaphoides Takahashi, 1921
- Platyaphis Takahashi, 1957
- Protopterocallis Richards, 1965
- Pseudochromaphis Zhang, 1982
- Pterocallis Passerini, 1860
- Quednaucallis Chakrabarti, 1988
- Sarucallis Shinji, 1922
- Serratocallis Quednau & Chakrabarti, 1976
- Shivaphis Das, 1918
- Siculaphis Quednau & Barbagallo, 1991
- Sinochaitophorus Takahashi, 1936
- Symydobius Mordvilko, 1894
- Takecallis Matsumura, 1917 (bamboo aphids)
- Taoia Quednau, 1973
- Therioaphis Walker, 1870
- Tiliaphis Takahashi, 1961
- Tinocallis Matsumura, 1919
- Tuberculatus Mordvilko, 1894
- Wanyucallis Quednau, 1999
- † Subtakecallis Raychaudhuri & Pal, 1974
- † Tinocalloides Basu, 1970
