= Calaphidini =

Scientific classification
- Domain: Eukaryota
- Kingdom: Animalia
- Phylum: Arthropoda
- Class: Insecta
- Order: Hemiptera
- Suborder: Sternorrhyncha
- Family: Aphididae
- Subfamily: Calaphidinae
- Tribe: Calaphidini; Oestlund, 1919

Genera
- See text

Tribe of true bugs

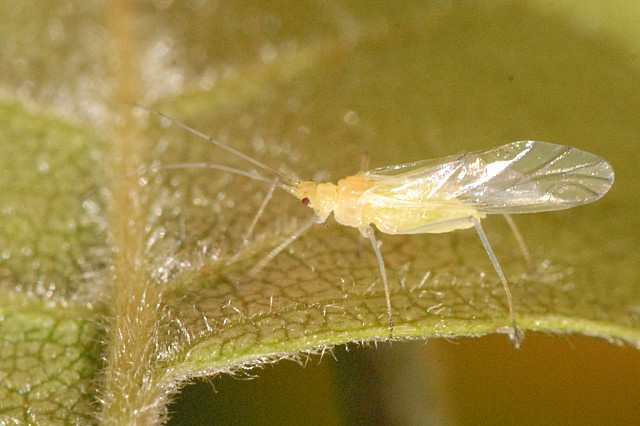
Calaphidini on a plant

Calaphidini is a bug tribe in the subfamily Calaphidinae.

== Genera ==
=== Subtribe: Calaphidina ===
Betacallis - Betulaphis - Boernerina - Calaphis - Callipterinella - Cepegillettea - Clethrobius - Euceraphis - Hannabura - Neobetulaphis - Oestlundiella - Symydobius - Taoia -

=== Subtribe: Monaphidina ===
Crypturaphis - Latgerina - Monaphis - Platyaphis -
