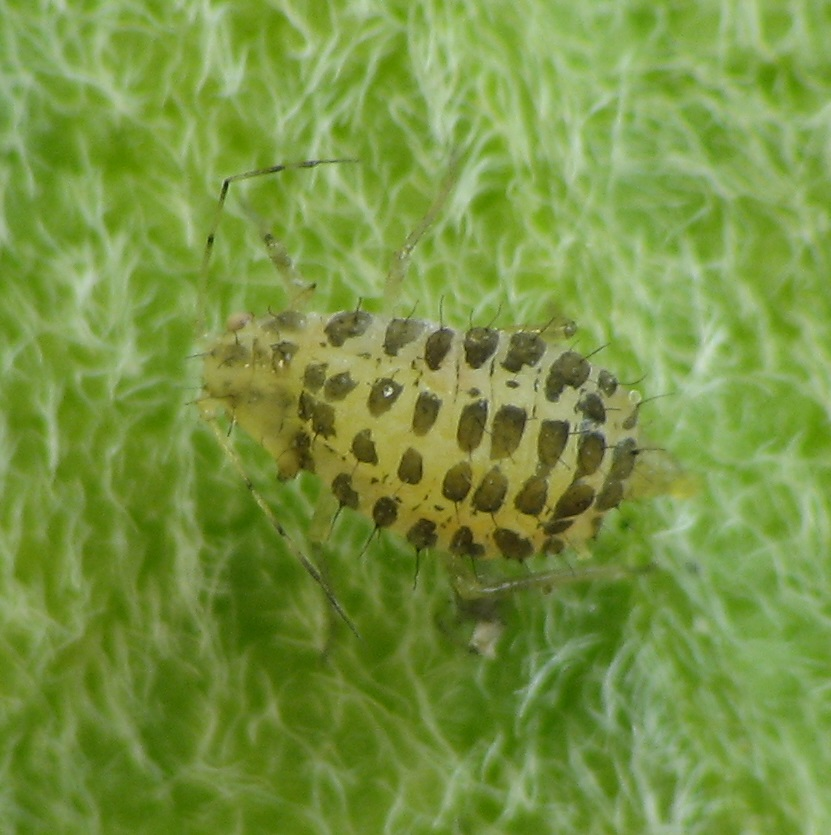
- Myzocallis asclepiadis on common milkweed

Scientific classification
- Domain: Eukaryota
- Kingdom: Animalia
- Phylum: Arthropoda
- Class: Insecta
- Order: Hemiptera
- Suborder: Sternorrhyncha
- Family: Aphididae
- Subfamily: Calaphidinae
- Tribe: Panaphidini; Oestlund, 1923

Genera
- See text

= Panaphidini =

Tribe of true bugs

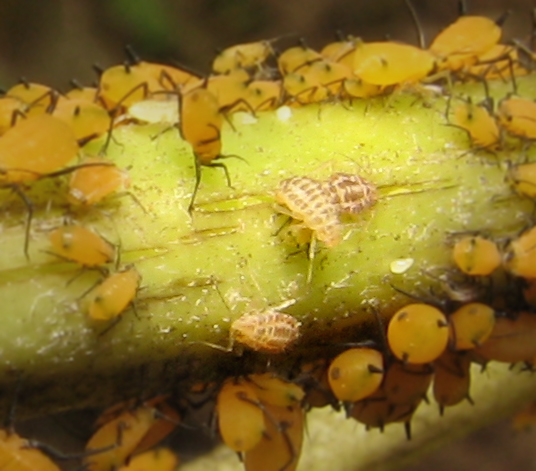
Myzocallis asclepiadis surrounded by Aphis nerii

Panaphidini is a tribe of aphids in the subfamily Calaphidinae.

== Genera ==
=== Subtribe: Myzocallidina ===
Andorracallis - Apulicallis - Hoplocallis - Hoplochaetaphis - Hoplochaitophorus - Lachnochaitophorus - Mexicallis - Myzocallis - Neosymydobius - Patchia - Serratocallis - Siculaphis - Tuberculatus - Wanyucallis

=== Subtribe: Panaphidina ===
Appendiseta - Bicaudella - Chromaphis - Chromocallis - Chuansicallis - Chucallis - Cranaphis - Ctenocallis - Dasyaphis - Eucallipterus - Indiochaitophorus - Melanocallis - Mesocallis - Monellia - Monelliopsis - Neochromaphis - Neocranaphis - Panaphis - Phyllaphoides - Protopterocallis - Pseudochromaphis - Pterocallis - Quednaucallis - Sarucallis - Shivaphis - Sinochaitophorus - Subtakecallis - Takecallis - Therioaphis - Tiliaphis - Tinocallis - Tinocalloides

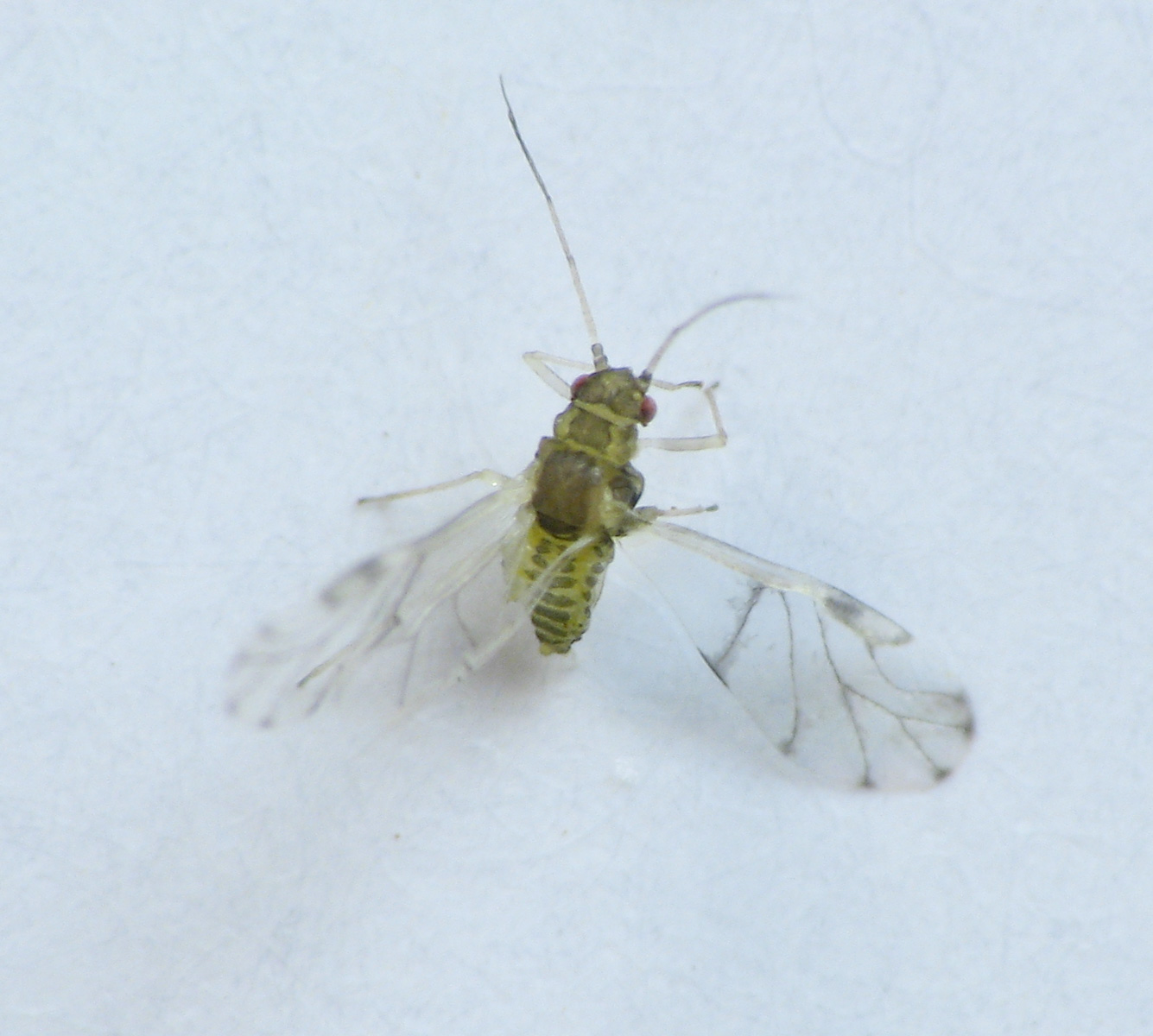
Myzocallis asclepiadis, winged adult
