= Callipterus =

Scientific classification
- Kingdom: Animalia
- Phylum: Arthropoda
- Class: Insecta
- Order: Hemiptera
- Suborder: Sternorrhyncha
- Family: Aphididae
- Subfamily: Calaphidinae
- Genus: Callipterus; Koch, 1855

Species
- Several, including: Callipterus caryaefoliae Davis; Callipterus mucidus Fitch; Callipterus robiniae (Gillette)

Genus of true bugs

Callipterus is a genus of aphids in the family Aphididae.

Names brought to synonymy

Callipterus elegans Koch, C.l., 1855 and Callipterus platani Kaltenbach, 1843 are synonyms for Tinocallis platani
