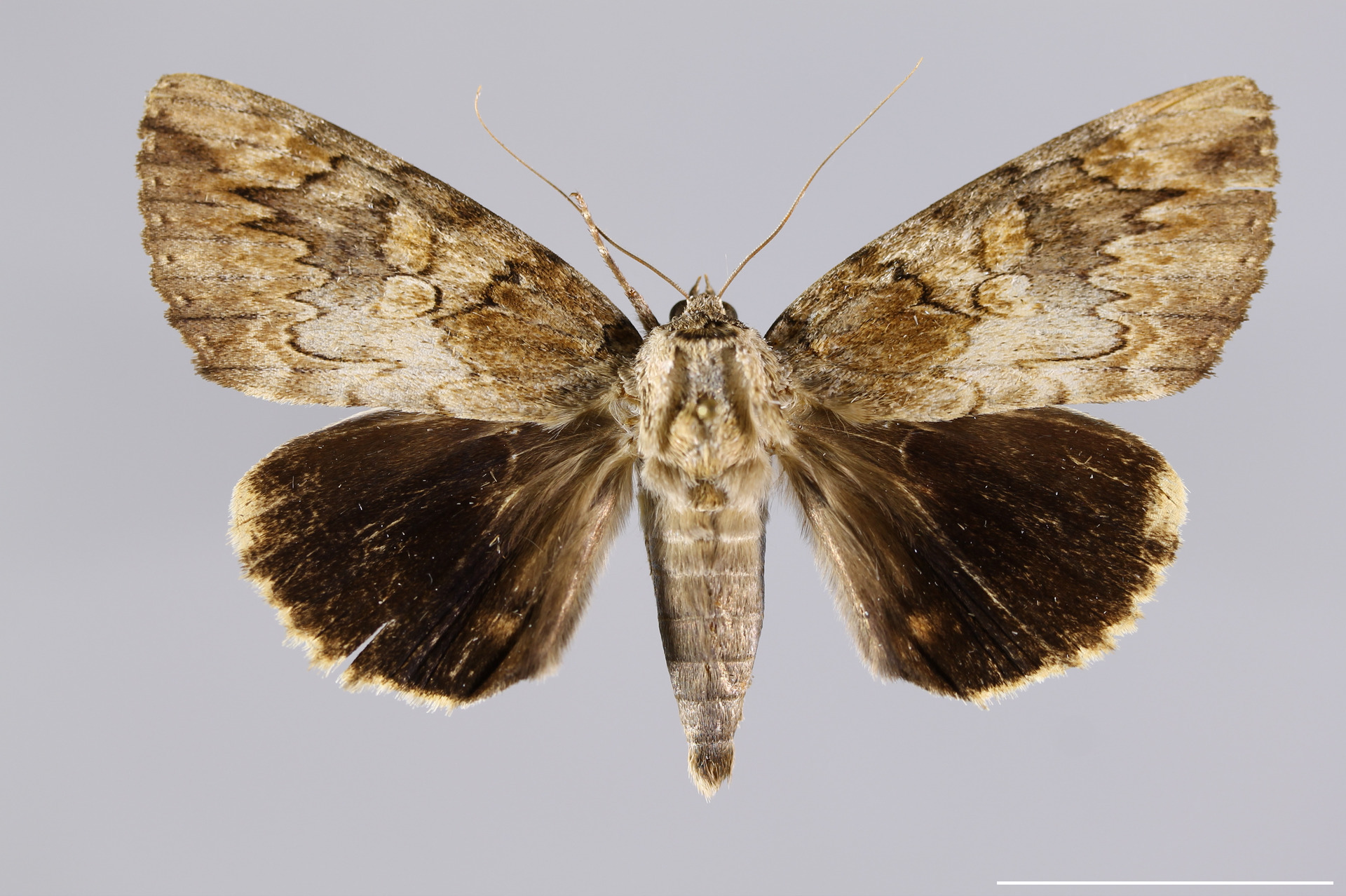

Conservation status
- Vulnerable (NatureServe)

Scientific classification
- Kingdom: Animalia
- Phylum: Arthropoda
- Class: Insecta
- Order: Lepidoptera
- Superfamily: Noctuoidea
- Family: Erebidae
- Genus: Catocala
- Species: C. atocala

Binomial name
- Catocala atocala Brou, 1985

= Catocala atocala =

Species of moth

Catocala atocala, the Brou's underwing, is a moth of the family Erebidae. It is endemic to the United States. Its main distribution area is the lower Mississippi River drainage in Louisiana and Mississippi, with some records as far north as southern Illinois, as well as from Oklahoma, Texas, and Florida.

Adults are on wing from July to August. The larvae feed on nutmeg hickory, Carya myristiciformis. Under laboratory conditions, they also feed on Juglans cinerea and Juglans nigra.

The forewing length is 33–37 mm (1.3–1.5 in).
