= Carya myristiciformis =

Nutmeg hickory

Conservation status
- Least Concern (IUCN 3.1)

Scientific classification
- Kingdom: Plantae
- Clade: Embryophytes
- Clade: Tracheophytes
- Clade: Angiosperms
- Clade: Eudicots
- Clade: Rosids
- Order: Fagales
- Family: Juglandaceae
- Genus: Carya
- Section: Carya sect. Carya
- Species: C. myristiciformis

Binomial name
- Carya myristiciformis (F.Michx.) Elliott (1824)
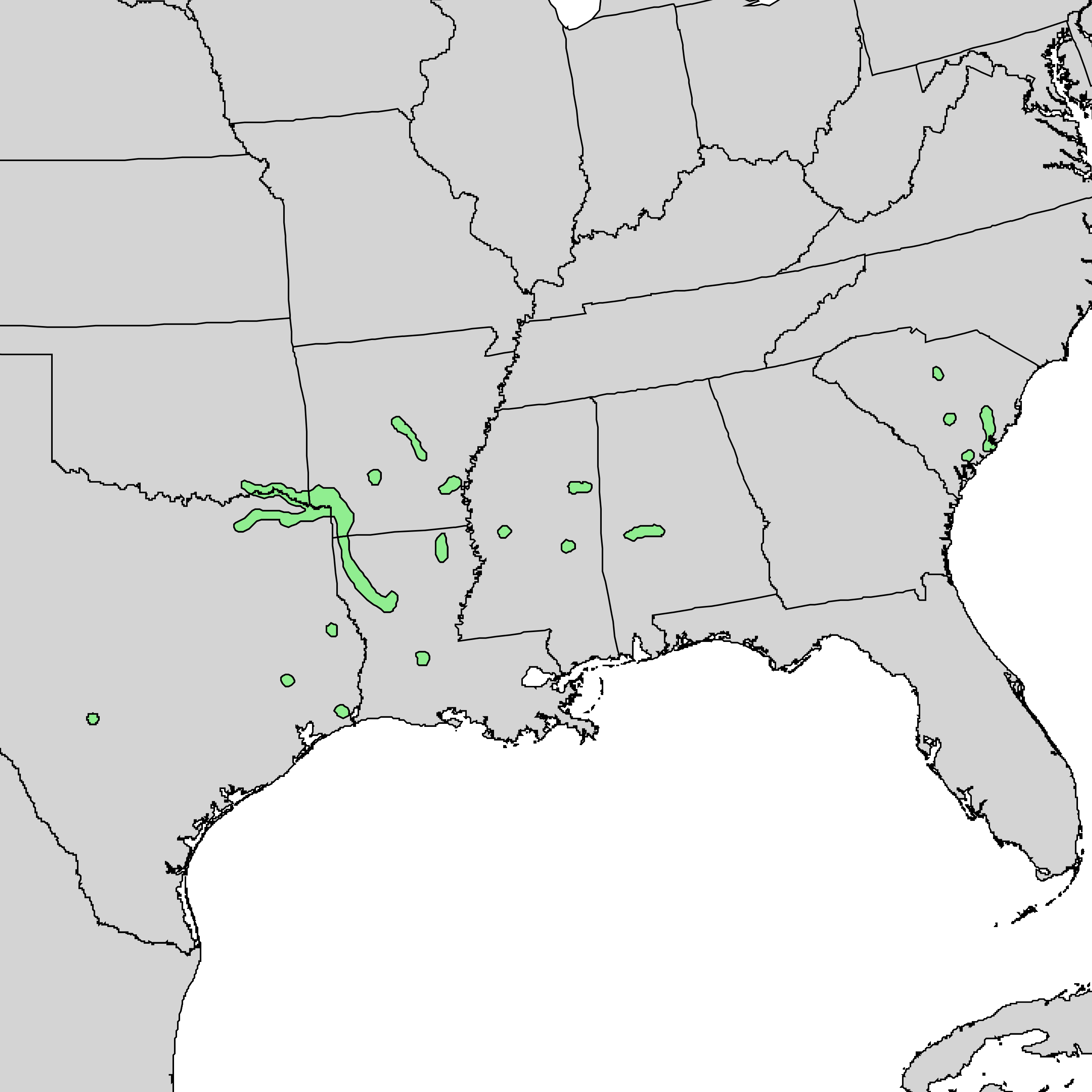
- Natural range of Carya myristiciformis

Synonyms
- Carya amara var. myristiciformis (F.Michx.) J.G.Cooper; Carya fernowiana (Sudw. ex Sarg.) Sudw.; Hicorius fernowiana Sudw. ex Sarg.; Hicorius myristica Raf.; Hicorius myristiciformis (F.Michx.) Britton; Juglans myristiciformis F.Michx.

Species of tree

Carya myristiciformis, the nutmeg hickory, a tree of the Juglandaceae or walnut family, also called swamp hickory or bitter water hickory, is found as small, possibly relict populations across the Southern United States and in northern Mexico on rich moist soils of higher bottom lands and stream banks. Little is known of the growth rate of nutmeg hickory. Logs and lumber are sold mixed with other hickories. The nuts are an oil-rich food for wildlife.

== Habitat ==
=== Native range ===
Nutmeg hickory is the rarest species in the genus, occurring in a few areas scattered in southeastern North Carolina, eastern South Carolina, central Alabama and Mississippi, northern Louisiana, southern Arkansas, eastern Texas, and northeastern Mexico. The species is typically found in river bottomlands with calcareous soil or marl ridges. The species is abundant only near Selma, Alabama, and in southern Arkansas. Nutmeg hickory has a native range nearly identical with that of Durand Oak (Q. durandii var. durandii). Both may be relics of a more ancient flora than now occupies the region.

=== Climate ===
Precipitation within the range of nutmeg hickory varies from 1,020 to 1,400 mm (40 to 55 in) per year, 510 mm (20 in) or more falling during the growing season. The frost-free period of most of the native range is about 240 days. Summers are warm and dry in the western portion of the range, but warm and wet in the South Carolina disjuncts. July temperatures average about 27 °C (81 °F). January temperatures average between 7 and 10 °C (45 and 50 °F). Extremes of temperature are −23 to 43 °C (−9 to 109 °F).

=== Soils and topography ===
Nutmeg hickory grows on a variety of loamy, silty, or clayey soils that may be described as moist, but well or moderately well drained and amply supplied with mineral nutrients. The species most often is found in minor stream bottoms, on second bottom flats, and on slopes or bluffs near streams. The principal soils on which nutmeg hickory is generally found are in the orders Alfisols and Inceptisols.

=== Associated forest cover ===
Nutmeg hickory is not an important species in any forest cover type and is only a minor associate in Swamp Chestnut Oak-Cherrybark Oak (Society of American Foresters Type 91). Other prominent associates in this type include white ash (Fraxinus americana); shagbark hickory (Carya ovata), shellbark hickory (Carya laciniosa), mockernut hickory (C. tomentosa), and bitternut hickory (Carya cordiformis); Shumard oak (Quercus shumardii); and blackgum (Nyssa sylvatica). Less important associates are willow oak (Quercus phellos), water oak (Quercus nigra), and Durand oaks (Quercus durandii); American elm (Ulmus americana) and winged elms (Ulmus alata); yellow-poplar (Liriodendron tulipifera); and American beech (Fagus grandifolia). Some common small trees and shrubs occurring with nutmeg hickory are eastern hophornbeam (Ostrya virginiana), American hornbeam (Carpinus caroliniana), flowering dogwood (Cornus florida), and oakleaf hydrangea (Hydrangea quercifolia). One survey near Charleston, SC, found red buckeye (Aesculus pavia), eastern redbud (Cercis canadensis), and witch-hazel (Hamamelis virginiana) associated with nutmeg hickory. Nutmeg hickory is often found in association with native American campsites, often in close association with several other hickory species. This is especially evident at sites on the banks of the Alabama river near Selma where Nutmeg hickory, bitternut, pignut, and Mockernut are found in close association in mixed groves of hardwood.

== Life history ==
=== Reproduction and early growth ===
The species is monoecious and forms imperfect flowers. Both male and female flowers are found on the current year's growth. The male flowers are long-stalked catkins, developing at the shoot base. The female flowers are in short spikes on peduncles at the end of the shoot. Flowering occurs from April to May, shortly after the leaves have started to open. Specifies of pollen production, dissemination and pollination are not known. The sweet, edible nut matures from September to October of the same year and falls between September and December. Its ellipsoidal shell is thick and hard.

Seed production starts when the trees are about 30 years old, and optimum seed-bearing age is 50 to 125 years. Good seed crops are produced every 2 to 3 years. As many as 70 liters (2 bu) can be produced by an open-grown tree. Seeds are disseminated by various methods, including squirrels and water.

The seeds of this species germinate from late April to early June. Germination is hypogeal. Burial of seeds by squirrels seems to be important, but it is not necessary for the successful establishment of seedlings.

Specific information on the vegetative reproduction of nutmeg hickory is not available. Like other hickories, it probably sprouts readily from small stumps, injured or top-killed seedlings and saplings, and from roots. Large stumps do not readily sprout, hence the larger the stump, the more likely that it will reproduce only by root suckers.

=== Sapling and pole stages to maturity ===
Nutmeg hickory is a medium-sized tree with a tall, straight trunk and stout, slightly spreading branches that form a narrow and rather open crown. It can attain heights of 24 to 30 m (79 to 98 ft) and a diameter of 61 cm (24 in).

Although the pecan hickories (which include nutmeg hickory) grow more rapidly than the true hickories, specific information on the growth rate of nutmeg hickory is lacking. The pecan hickories, in turn, grow more slowly than most other bottom-land hardwoods. The average 10-year diameter increase for hickories in natural, unmanaged stands in the northeast Louisiana delta was 4.3 cm (1.7 in) in the 15- to 30-cm (6- to 12-in) diameter class; 3.3 cm (1.3 in) in the 33- to 48-cm (13- to 19-in) diameter class; and 3.8 cm (1.5 in) in the 51- to 71-cm (20- to 28-in) diameter class.

Pure stands of nutmeg hickory probably do not exist, and no volume figures are available. Logs and lumber from merchantable nutmeg hickory are sold mixed with other hickories.

Rooting Habit- Nutmeg hickory has a strongly developed taproot, especially on well-drained soil. Seedlings of hickory quickly develop a heavy taproot and fine lateral roots. During the pole stage, a robust, spreading lateral root system is developed.

Nutmeg hickory is classed as intolerant of shade. It is intolerant as a mature tree, but tolerant in the seedling and sapling stage during which it may survive for a long time in the understory and then respond to release. Any partial cutting system that removes larger, faster-growing competition encourages nutmeg hickory.

Fire damages hickory of all ages. A light burn kills the tops of seedlings and saplings; a more intense fire wounds larger trees and provides entry for butt-rotting fungi.

Several insects attack hickory but rarely become epidemic. The forest tent caterpillar (Malacosoma disstria), walnut caterpillar (Datana integerrima), and walkingstick (Diapheromera femorata) may defoliate individual trees or limbs. Sucking insects, including aphids (Monellia spp.), feed on the underside of leaves, causing them to curl and drop prematurely. The twig girdler (Oncideres cingulata) may seriously prune seedlings and even large trees by girdling the terminal and branches. The hickory bark beetle (Scolytus quadrispinosus) can be troublesome during dry years and periods of stress.

Ambrosia beetles (Platypus spp. and Xyleborus spp.) and powderpost beetles (Lyctus spp. and Xylobiops basilaris) often cause economic damage to logs and lumber during storage and air-drying.

No important diseases of hickory other than a number of wood rots have been reported. Bird peck defect, caused by the yellow-bellied sapsucker, is common and serious in nutmeg hickory.

== Special uses ==
The nuts of nutmeg hickory are relished by squirrels, which begin cutting them while they are still green. Other rodents and wildlife also eat the nuts. The species is too rare over most of its range to be of major economic importance. The wood of this pecan hickory is slightly inferior in strength and toughness to that of the true or upland hickories, but owing to the small volumes involved and difficulty of distinguishing it from the true hickories, nutmeg hickory is not separated from them during logging.

== Genetics ==
Nutmeg hickory is a 32-chromosome species that readily hybridizes with other hickory species and was hybridized with pecan by Clinton Graves. Traits such as thin husks with suture wings typical of Apocarya combined with leaf, stem, and bud traits typical of Carya place this species intermediate between the two groups or sections of genus Carya.

== Gallery ==
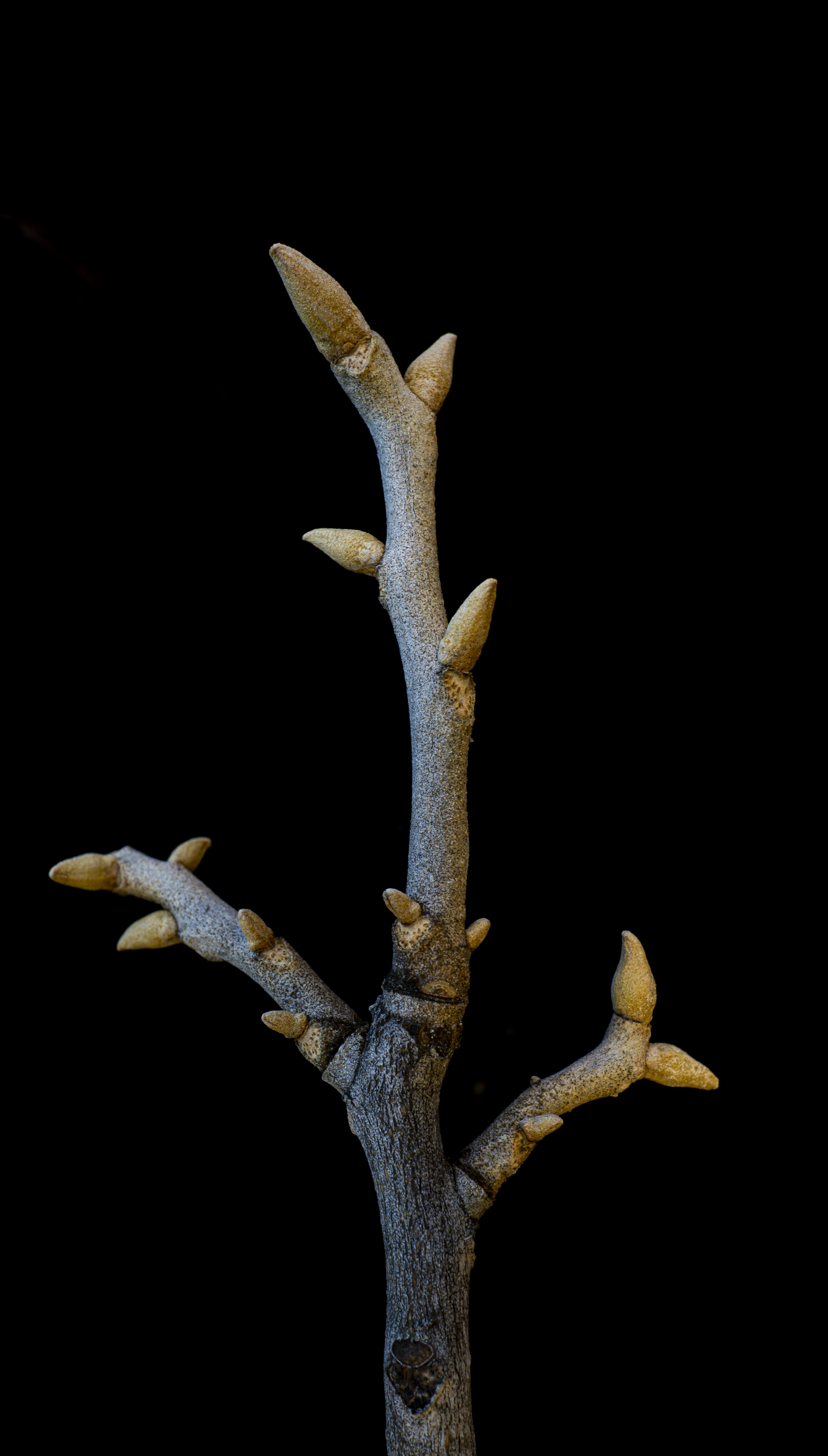
Buds

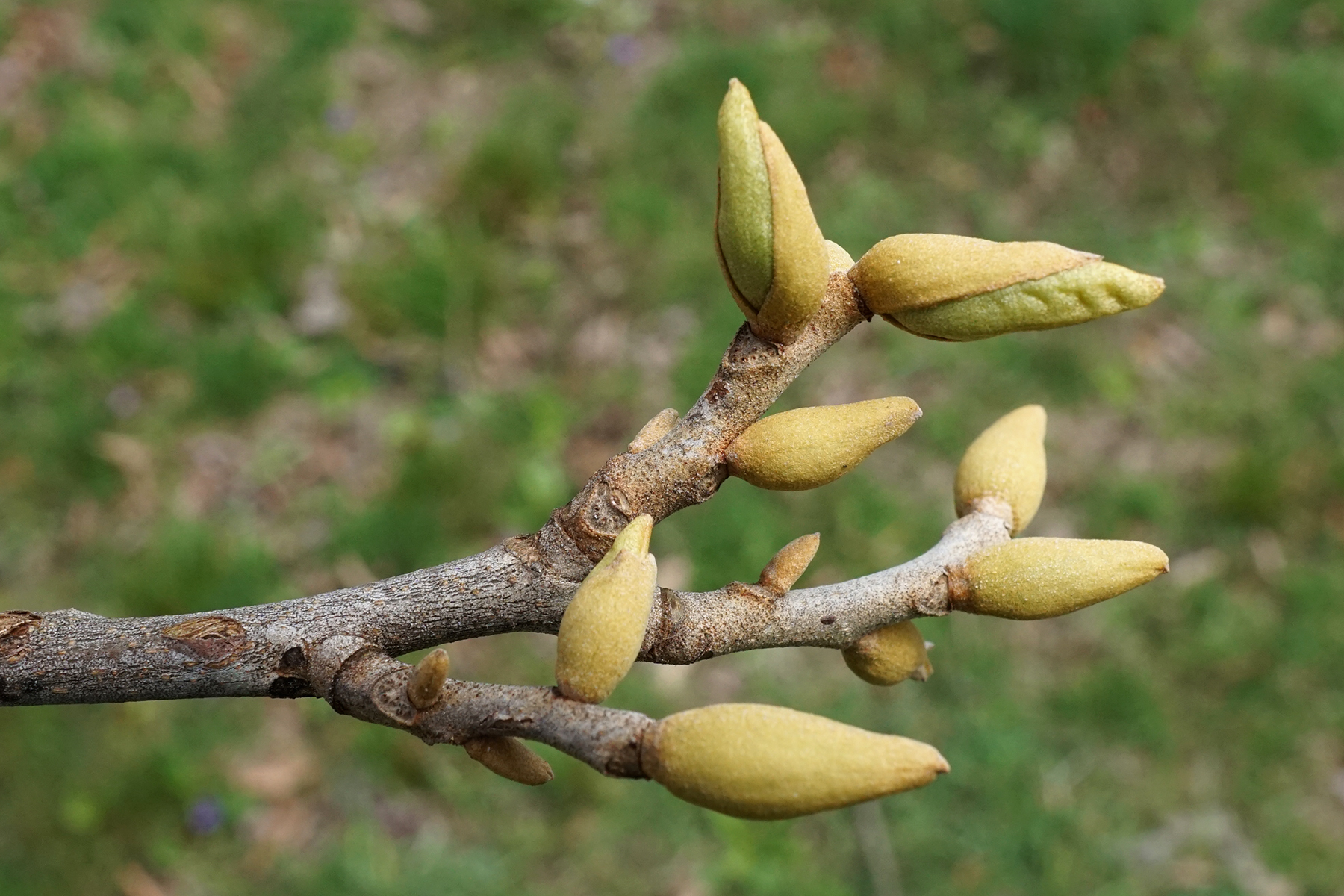
Buds

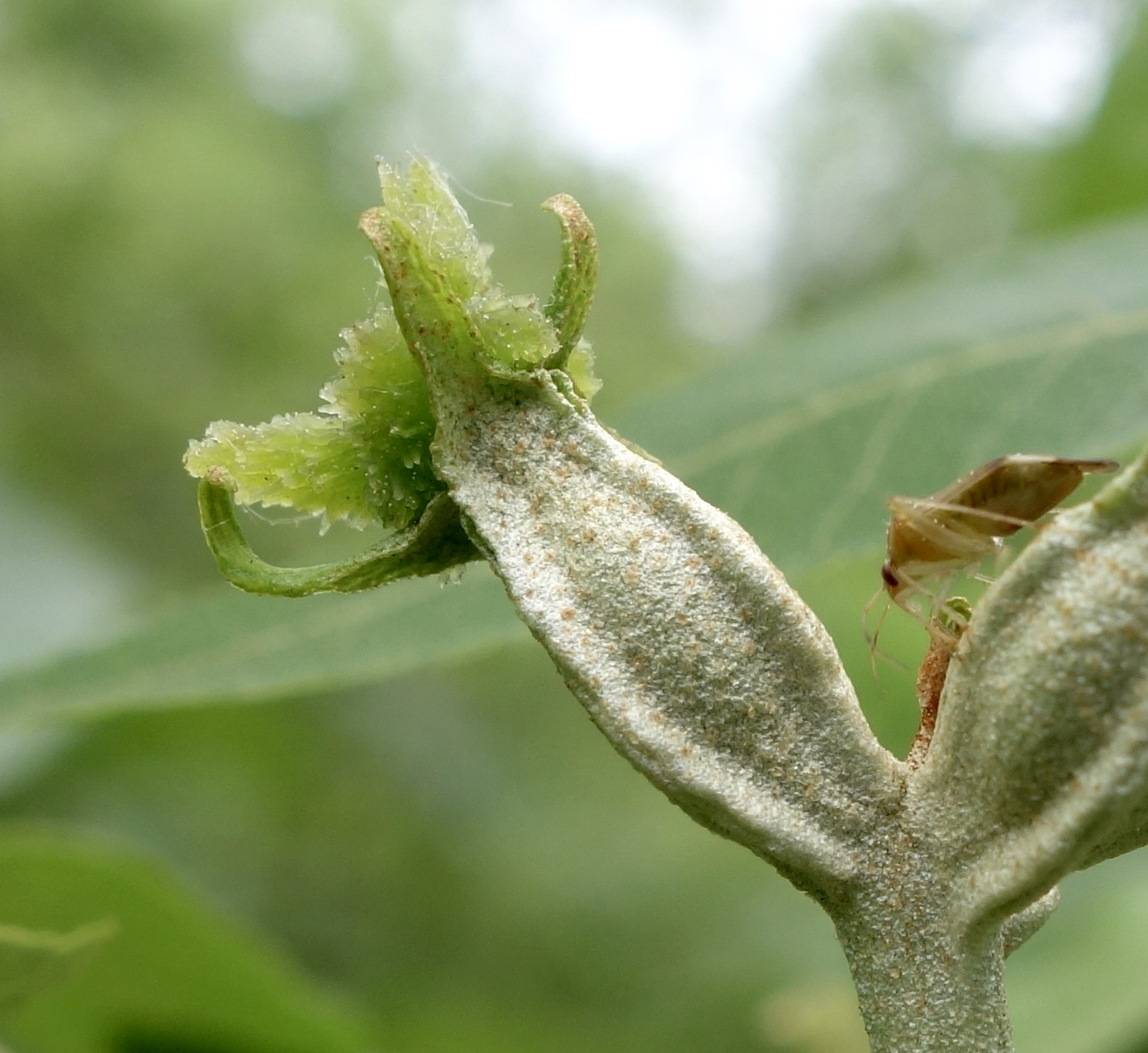
Female flower

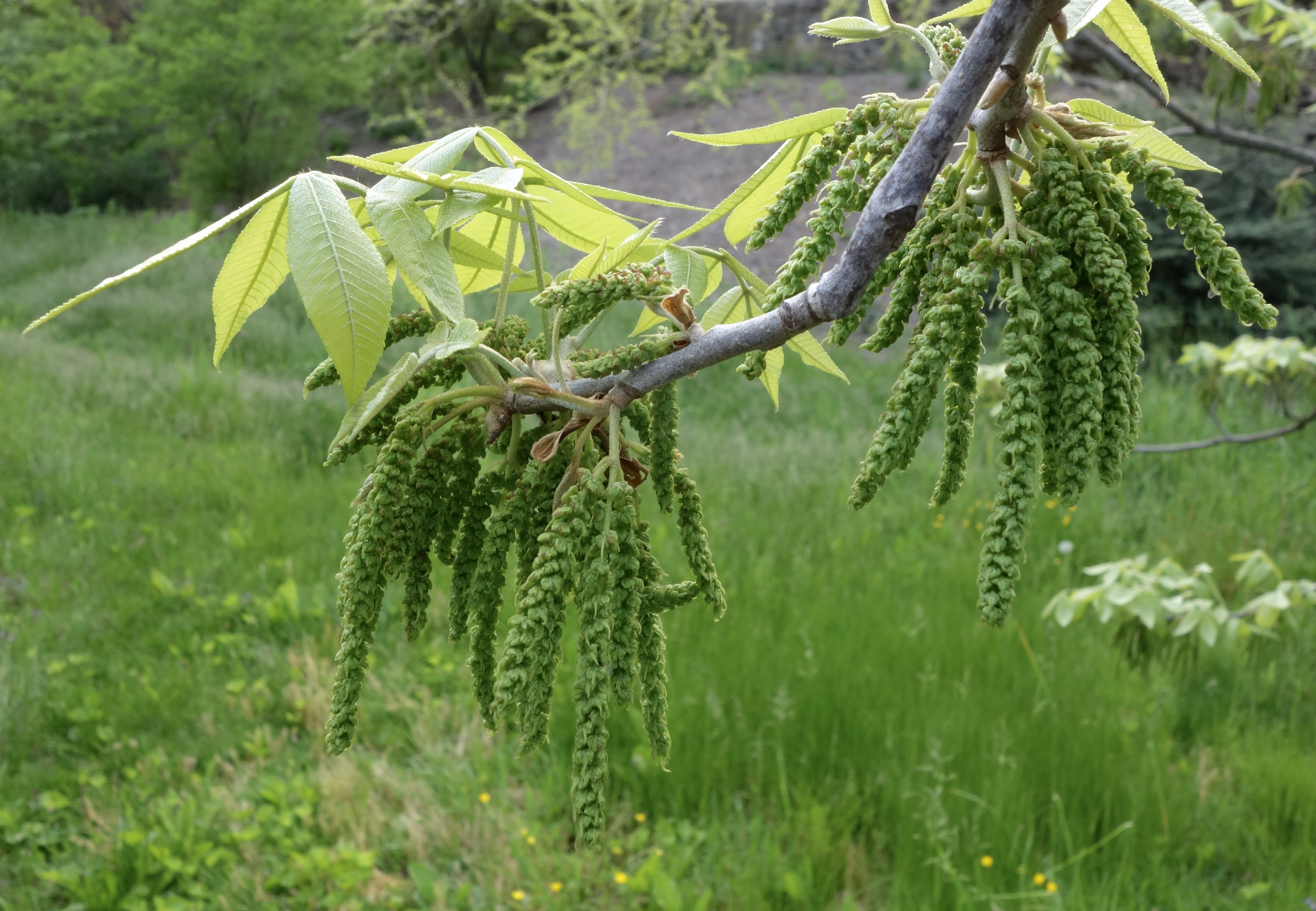
Catkins of male flowers and emerging leaves

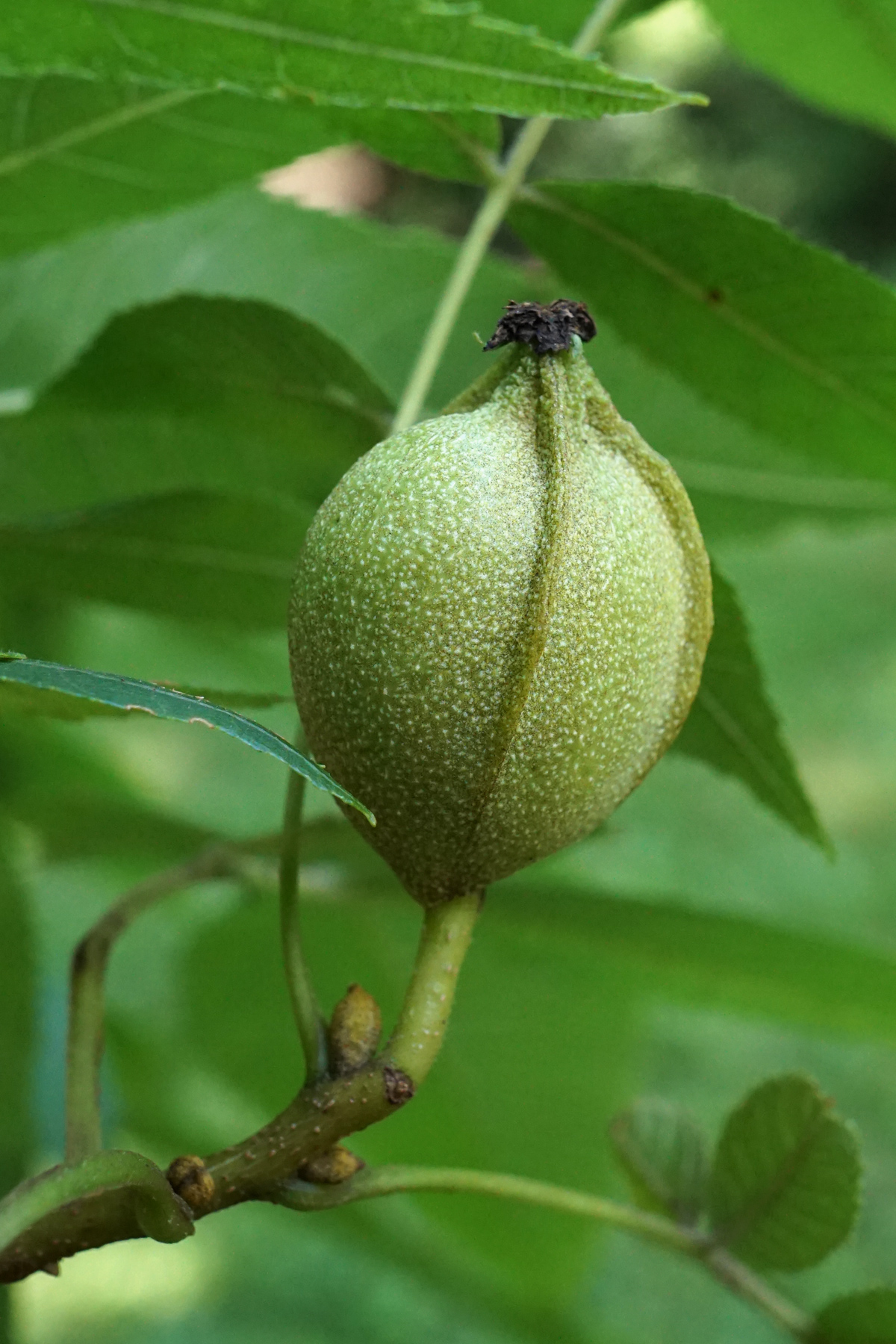
Maturing fruit
