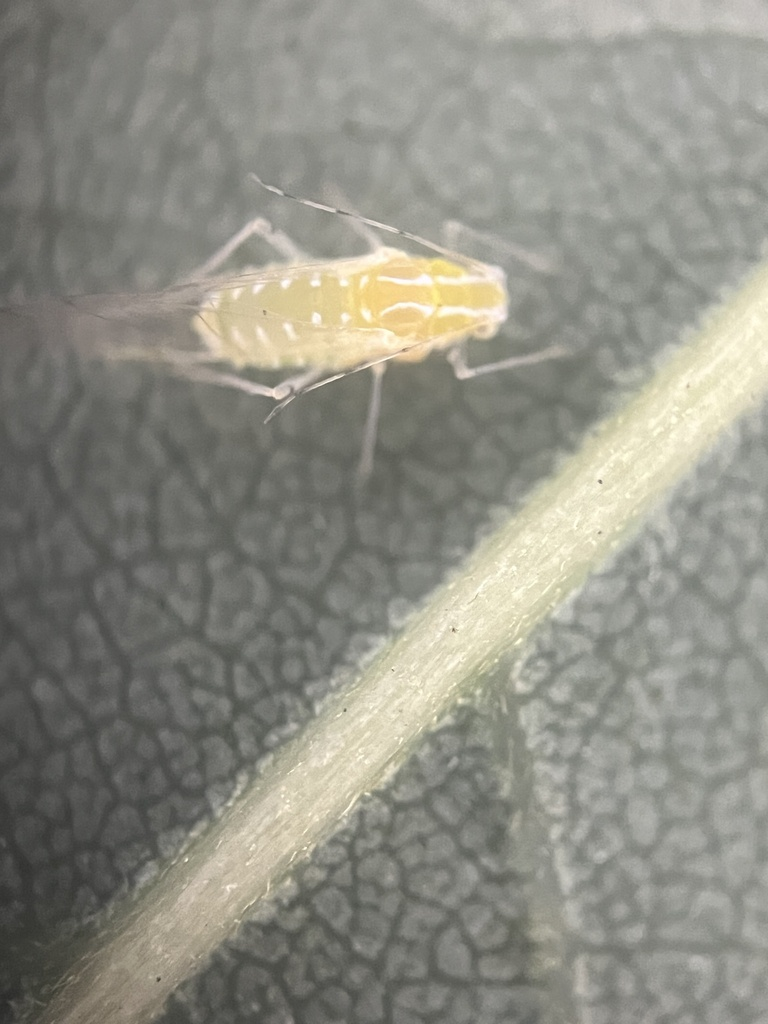

Scientific classification
- Kingdom: Animalia
- Phylum: Arthropoda
- Class: Insecta
- Order: Hemiptera
- Suborder: Sternorrhyncha
- Family: Aphididae
- Subfamily: Calaphidinae
- Tribe: Panaphidini
- Genus: Appendiseta; Richards, 1965
- Species: A. robiniae

Binomial name
- Appendiseta robiniae (Gillette, 1907)

Synonyms
- Callipterus robiniae Gillette, 1907

= Appendiseta =

Species of aphid

Appendiseta robiniae, the black locust aphid, is an aphid in the monotypic genus Appendiseta, found in North America and Europe.

This species feeds exclusively off Robinia pseudoacacia, the black locust tree. The first indication is the host plant for figuring out this species. Later on the species has distinct blue stripes down the top of the aphid for the winged adults. the cauda of this species is notably knobbed and the siphunculi are tiny cones. Juveniles have dorsal hairs.

The species was described by Clarence Preston Gillette in 1907.
