= B. tuberculatus =

B. tuberculatus may refer to:

- Bottosaurus tuberculatus, an extinct crocodile species from the Paleocene
- Brachychiton tuberculatus, the meayacka, a plant species in the genus Brachychiton
- Bufo tuberculatus, a toad species endemic to China

== See also ==
- Tuberculatus
