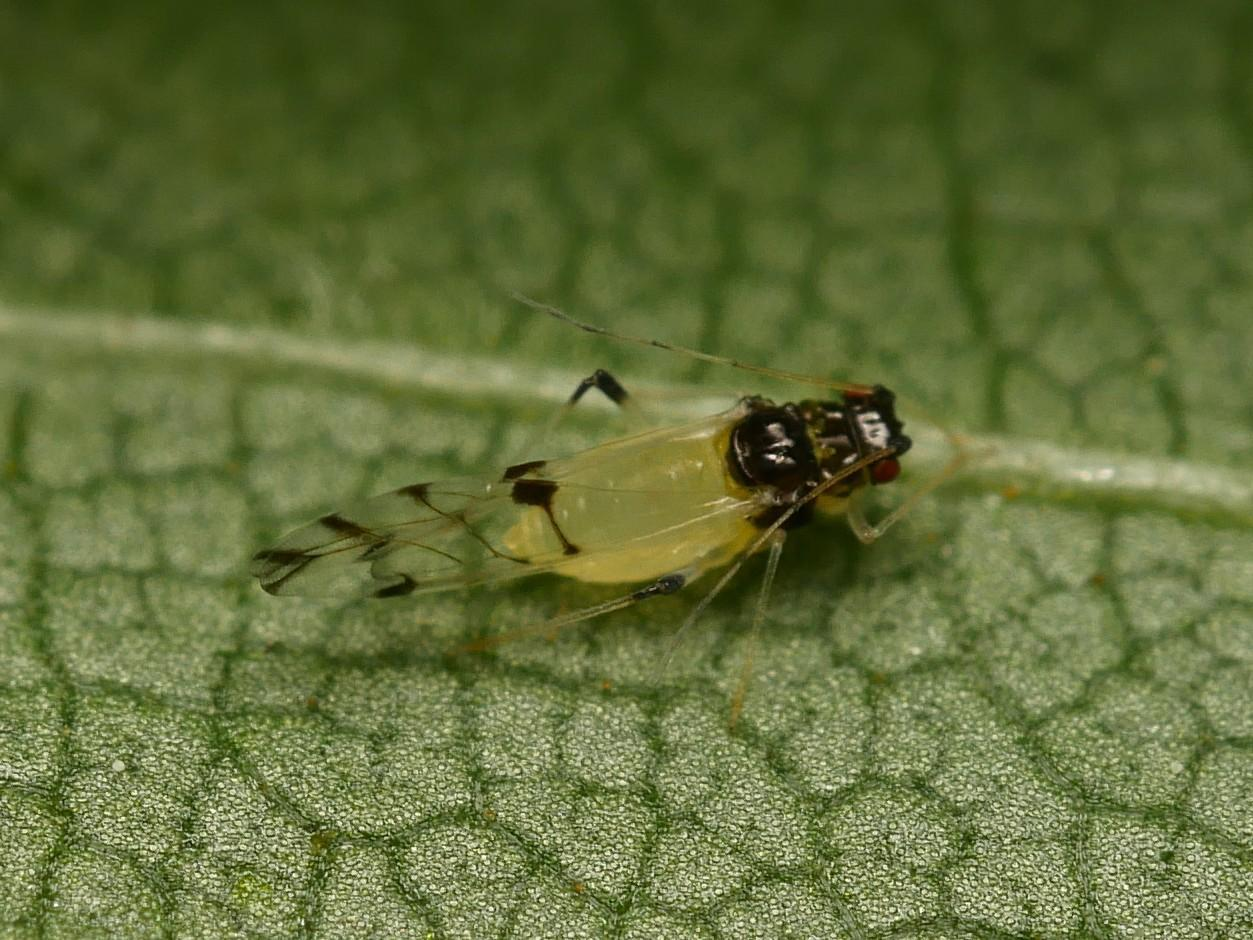
- Tinocallis takachihoensis

Scientific classification
- Kingdom: Animalia
- Phylum: Arthropoda
- Clade: Pancrustacea
- Class: Insecta
- Order: Hemiptera
- Suborder: Sternorrhyncha
- Family: Aphididae
- Subfamily: Calaphidinae
- Tribe: Panaphidini
- Subtribe: Panaphidina
- Genus: Tinocallis; Matsumura, 1919

Species
- Several, including: Tinocallis kahawaluokalani; Tinocallis platani

Synonyms
- Archicallis (Aizenberg, 1954); Lutaphis (Shinji, 1924); Melanocallis (Oestlund, 1922); Neotherioaphis (Behura & Dash, 1975); Sappocallis (Matsumura, 1919); Sarucallis (Shinji, 1922); Tuberocallis (Nevsky, 1929)

= Tinocallis =

Genus of true bugs

Tinocallis is a genus of aphids in the subfamily Calaphidinae.
