= Tuberculatus querciformosanus =

Scientific classification
- Kingdom: Animalia
- Phylum: Arthropoda
- Class: Insecta
- Order: Hemiptera
- Suborder: Sternorrhyncha
- Family: Aphididae
- Genus: Tuberculatus
- Species: T. querciformosanus

Binomial name
- Tuberculatus querciformosanus (Takahashi, 1921)

Species of aphid

Tuberculatus querciformosanus is a species of aphid, first described in 1921 by Ryoichi Takahashi as Myzocallis querciformosanus. It has been assigned to the subgenus, Orientuberculoides, within the genus, Tuberculatus.

As the species epithet, querciformosanus, and the title of the original paper indicate, this species is found in Formosa (Taiwan), and (one of) its host species is an oak (Quercus).

It is also found in Korea.
