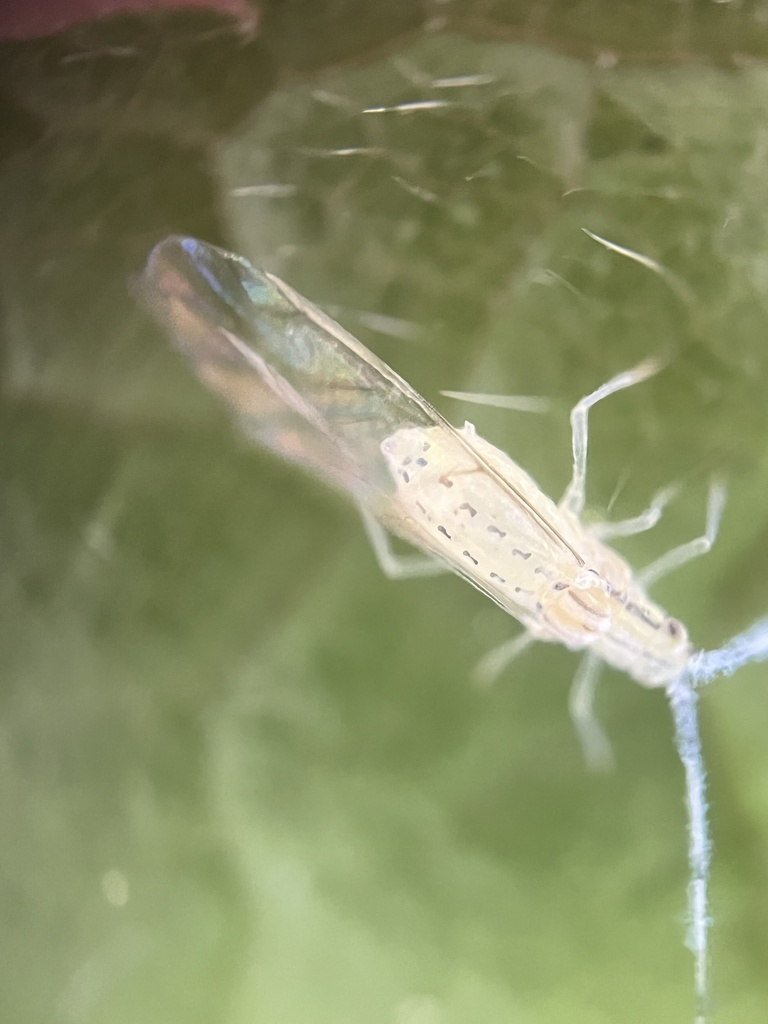

Scientific classification
- Kingdom: Animalia
- Phylum: Arthropoda
- Class: Insecta
- Order: Hemiptera
- Suborder: Sternorrhyncha
- Family: Aphididae
- Genus: Takecallis
- Species: T. arundinariae

Binomial name
- Takecallis arundinariae Essig, 1917

= Takecallis arundinariae =

Species of aphid

Takecallis arundinariae, commonly known as the black-spotted bamboo aphid, is a species of aphid found worldwide, originating in Eurasia.

This species uses various bamboo species worldwide. This species is not picky in its host plants, and major infestations can cause problems for the plants if left uncontrolled.

The overall appearance is an aphid living underneath the leaves of bamboo plants, black spots across the whiteish abdomen. there are stripes towards the head. The antenna are fuzzy and long. The siphunculi are small and cup shaped.

Takecallis arundinariae was described by Edward Oliver Essig in 1917.
