= Tinocallis platani =

Scientific classification
- Domain: Eukaryota
- Kingdom: Animalia
- Phylum: Arthropoda
- Class: Insecta
- Order: Hemiptera
- Suborder: Sternorrhyncha
- Family: Aphididae
- Genus: Tinocallis
- Species: T. platani

Binomial name
- Tinocallis platani (Kaltenbach, 1843)

Synonyms
- Tinocallis (Eotinocallis) platani; Aphis platanicola (Walker, 1848); Callipterus elegans (Koch, C.l., 1855); Callipterus platani (Kaltenbach, 1843); Lachnus platani (Kaltenbach, 1843); Myzocallis pulchellus (Glendenning, 1929); Tinocallis pulchellus (Glendenning, 1929)

Species of true bug

Tinocallis platani is a species of aphids in the subfamily Calaphidinae. It has a Nearctic distribution and is found in Europe and North America.
