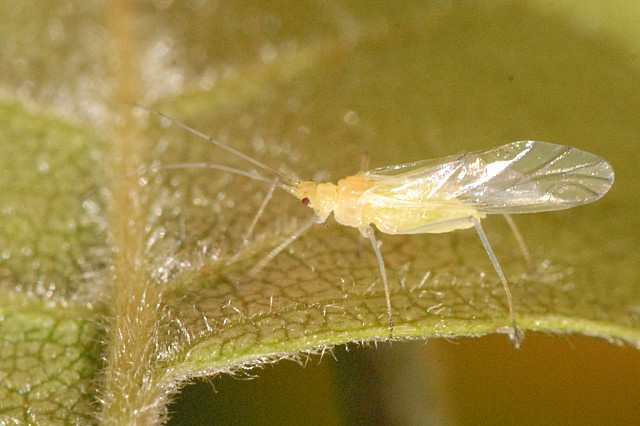
- Calaphis flava

Scientific classification
- Domain: Eukaryota
- Kingdom: Animalia
- Phylum: Arthropoda
- Class: Insecta
- Order: Hemiptera
- Suborder: Sternorrhyncha
- Family: Aphididae
- Subfamily: Calaphidinae
- Tribe: Calaphidini
- Subtribe: Calaphidina
- Genus: Calaphis; Walsh, 1862

= Calaphis =

Genus of true bugs

Calaphis is a genus of true bugs belonging to the family Aphididae.

The genus was first described by Benjamin Dann Walsh in 1862.

The species of this genus are found in Eurasia and North America.

Species:

- Calaphis betulicola
- Calaphis flava
