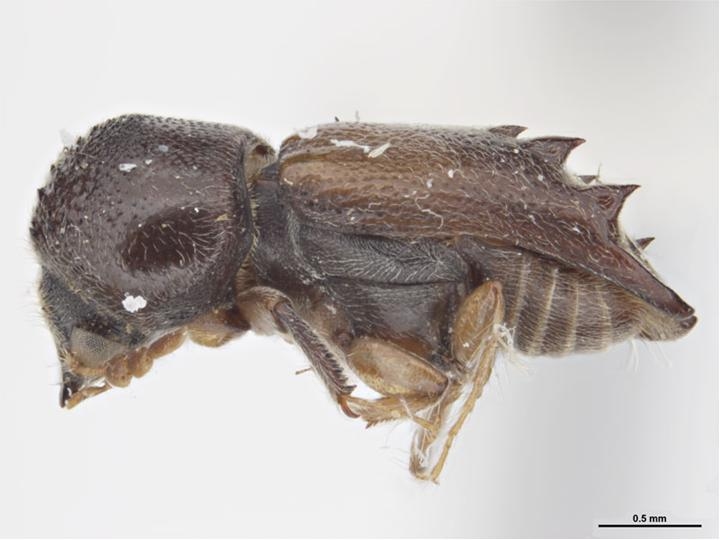

Scientific classification
- Domain: Eukaryota
- Kingdom: Animalia
- Phylum: Arthropoda
- Class: Insecta
- Order: Coleoptera
- Suborder: Polyphaga
- Family: Bostrichidae
- Genus: Xylobiops
- Species: X. sextuberculatus

Binomial name
- Xylobiops sextuberculatus (LeConte, 1858)

= Xylobiops sextuberculatus =

Species of beetle

Xylobiops sextuberculatus is a species of horned powder-post beetle in the family Bostrichidae. It is found in Central America and North America.
