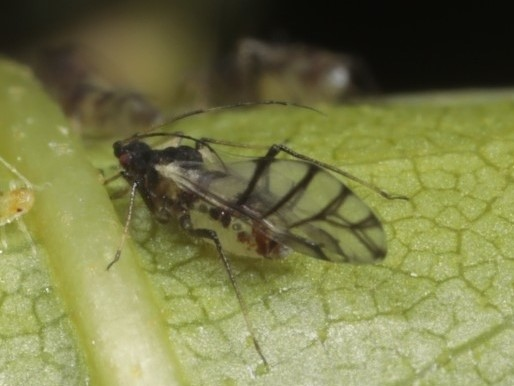

Scientific classification
- Domain: Eukaryota
- Kingdom: Animalia
- Phylum: Arthropoda
- Class: Insecta
- Order: Hemiptera
- Suborder: Sternorrhyncha
- Family: Aphididae
- Genus: Callipterinella
- Species: C. tuberculata

Binomial name
- Callipterinella tuberculata (Heyden, 1837)

= Callipterinella tuberculata =

Species of true bug

Callipterinella tuberculata is a species of true bug belonging to the family Aphididae.

It is native to Europe.
