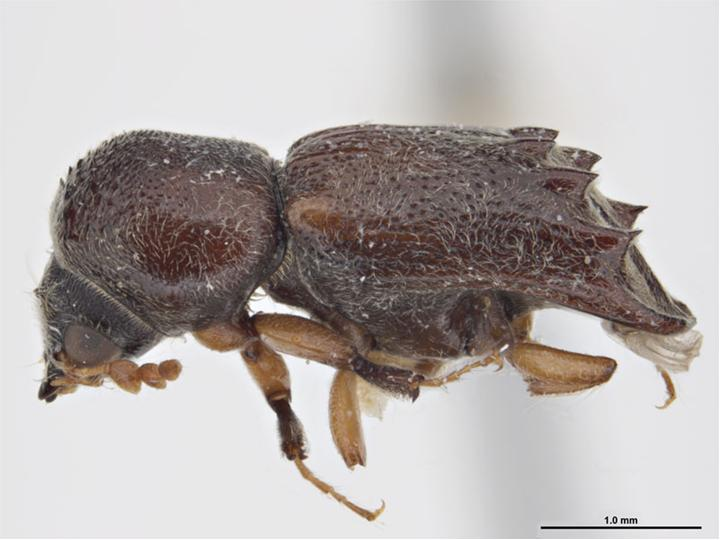

Scientific classification
- Domain: Eukaryota
- Kingdom: Animalia
- Phylum: Arthropoda
- Class: Insecta
- Order: Coleoptera
- Suborder: Polyphaga
- Family: Bostrichidae
- Tribe: Xyloperthini
- Genus: Xylobiops
- Species: X. texanus

Binomial name
- Xylobiops texanus (Horn, 1878)

= Xylobiops texanus =

Species of beetle

Xylobiops texanus is a species of horned powder-post beetle in the family Bostrichidae. It is found in the Caribbean Sea, Central America, and North America.
