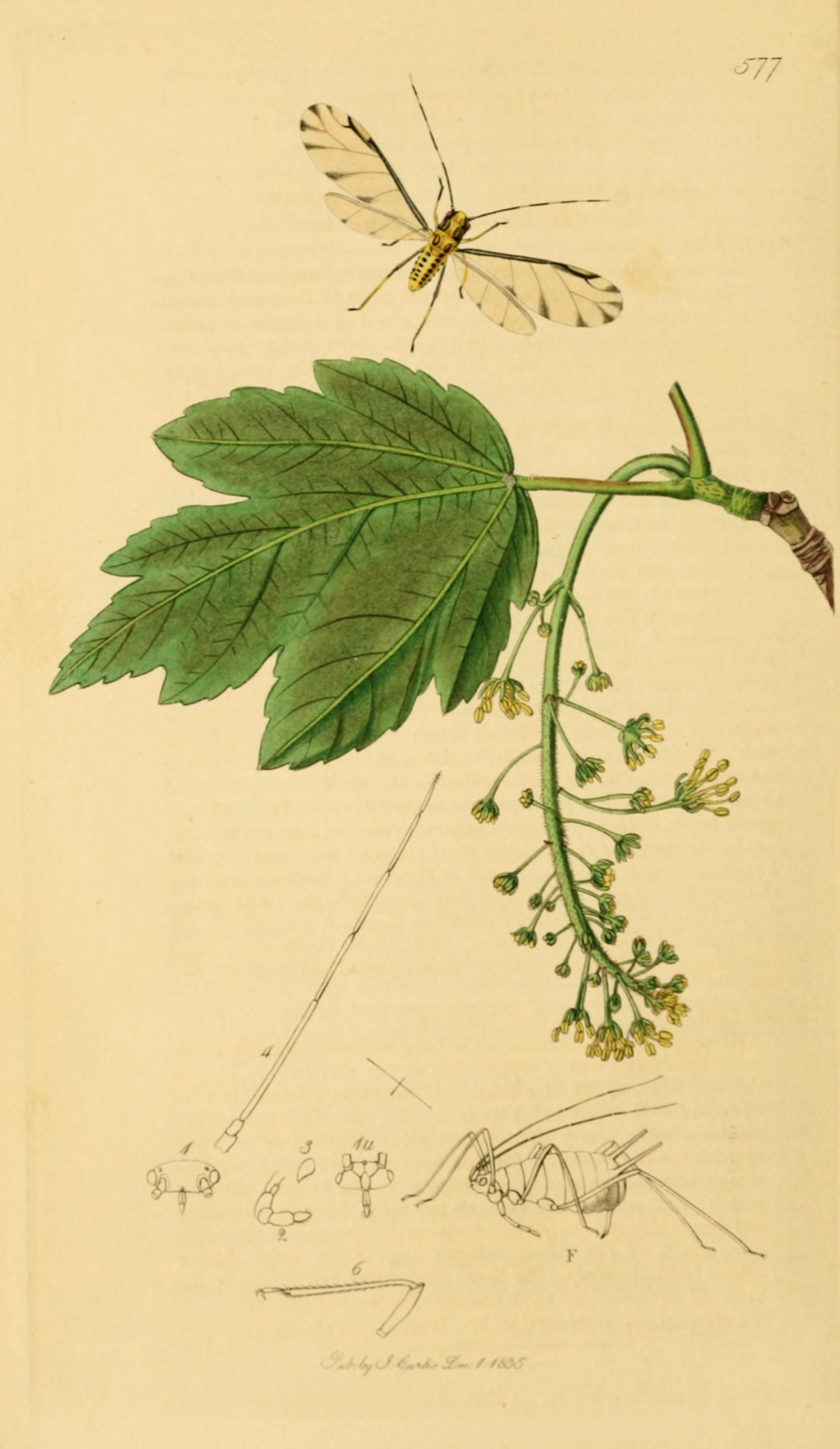
- Plate 177 from John Curtis's; British Entomology (1824-1839)

Scientific classification
- Kingdom: Animalia
- Phylum: Arthropoda
- Class: Insecta
- Order: Hemiptera
- Suborder: Sternorrhyncha
- Family: Aphididae
- Genus: Eucallipterus
- Species: E. tiliae

Binomial name
- Eucallipterus tiliae Linnaeus, 1758

= Eucallipterus tiliae =

Species of true bug

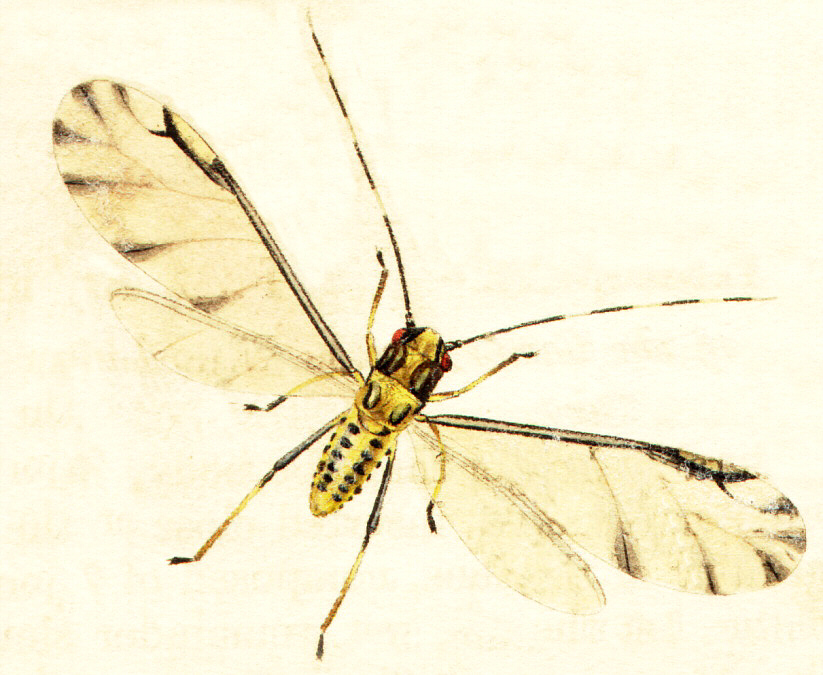
Detail of above plate

Eucallipterus tiliae, also known as the linden aphid or lime-tree aphid, is a member of the family Aphididae. Native to Eurasia in recent times, it is now found worldwide wherever species of Tilia occur.

Adults are readily identified by a black stripe along the body and a cloudy-black wing edge. Ornamental trees along streets and parking areas are often populated by these insects, leaving a sticky residue (honeydew) on the ground below and causing a black mould to grow on the leaves. Numbers increase continuously over the growing season of the host plant, and because of the gregarious nature of these insects large aggregations are common. Ten species of Ichneumonoidea, nine of Chalcidoidea, various Coccinellidae, and Trioxys curvicaudus are recorded as parasitoids on Eucallipterus.

The distribution of young and mature aphids on the leaf surfaces is dictated by their stylet length - the short stylets of young aphids cannot penetrate the lignin of the sclerenchyma of large veins and are thus restricted to feeding on smaller veins.

Antennae considerably longer than the body, often as long as the wings, setaceous and naked, inserted close to the inner margin of the eyes in front of the face, composed of 7 joints, two basal stout and oblong, 1st the stoutest, remainder slender, 3rd very long, 4th only half as long, 5th and 6th about the same length, 7th considerably shorter and more slender, with a few hairs at the apex (4). Trophi arising at the lower part of the face between the anterior coxae (F). Labrum short broad and subconic (3). Mandibles and maxillae slender. Labium bent under the breast, and united to the antepectus, not longer than the head and rather stout in the males (2 the profile), composed of 4? short oblong joints, 2nd the stoutest and curved, 4th the smallest ovate-conic and pilose : longer and slenderer in the female (F). Head immovable, transverse-convex (1 front view): face transverse-ovate and very much deflexed beneath (1 u, underside of head) : eyes globose, remote, lateral, not very prominent : ocelli remote, 1 placed near to the inner margin of the eyes, the 3rd close to the anterior margin of the forehead. Thorax oblong, the collar very long in the male : scutellum semiorbicular. Abdomen elongate-conic with 2 tubercles or tubes on the 5th? segment in the males, always elongated in the females with a horny process beneath the apex (F). Wings membranous, deflexed in repose; superior twice as long as the body, ample, the marginalfurcate cells short; inferior much smaller, with 2 slightly oblique nervures, remote at the costa : Females generally apterous (F). Legs slender and long, especially the hinder pair : thighs elongated in the females as well as the tibiae, especially in the hinder pair, which are not curved: tarsi short, bi-articulate, basal joint minute, 2nd long and clavate : claws curved and acute (6, foreleg)

— John Curtis in British Entomology
