= Sarucallis =

Scientific classification
- Domain: Eukaryota
- Kingdom: Animalia
- Phylum: Arthropoda
- Class: Insecta
- Order: Hemiptera
- Suborder: Sternorrhyncha
- Family: Aphididae
- Subfamily: Calaphidinae
- Tribe: Panaphidini
- Genus: Sarucallis; Shinji, 1922
- Species: S. kahawaluokalani

Binomial name
- Sarucallis kahawaluokalani (Kirkaldy, 1907)

Genus of true bugs

Sarucallis, the crape myrtle aphid, is a genus of aphids in the family Aphididae. There is one described species in the genus Sarucallis and it is Sarucallis kahawaluokalanu (S. kahawaluokalani). They can grow to a body length of 1.2 to 1.8 millimeters.

== Distribution ==
They can be found in North America (both Western North America, Eastern North America and Hawaii) but they are native in Asia (Japan, China, South Korea and Central Asia). They also live in areas like Southern South America and the Caribbean islands.

== Ecology ==
They are a terrestrial genus.

=== Predators ===
Two of their predators are the Yellow pecan aphid (Monelliopsis pecanis) and the blackmargined aphid (Monellia caryella). Other predatory animal groups that feed on S. kahwaluokalanu are Coccinellidae (ladybugs), Syrphidae (Hover flies), Chrysopidae (Green lace wings), and Anthocoridae.
