= Tinocallis kahawaluokalani =

Scientific classification
- Domain: Eukaryota
- Kingdom: Animalia
- Phylum: Arthropoda
- Class: Insecta
- Order: Hemiptera
- Suborder: Sternorrhyncha
- Family: Aphididae
- Genus: Tinocallis
- Species: T. kahawaluokalani

Binomial name
- Tinocallis kahawaluokalani (Kirkaldy, 1907)

Synonyms
- Tinocallis chhenafuli (Behura & Dash, 1975); Tinocallis kohawaluokalani (Takahashi, 1921); Tinocallis lagerstroemiae; Tinocallis lythrae Shinji, 1922

Species of true bug

Tinocallis kahawaluokalani, the crapemyrtle aphid, also known as Sarucallis (Tinocallis) kahawaluokalani, is an aphid in the superfamily Aphidoidea in the order Hemiptera. It is a true bug and sucks sap from plants. It is most invasive aphids known from Crape myrtle. They were first discovered from Hawaii.
