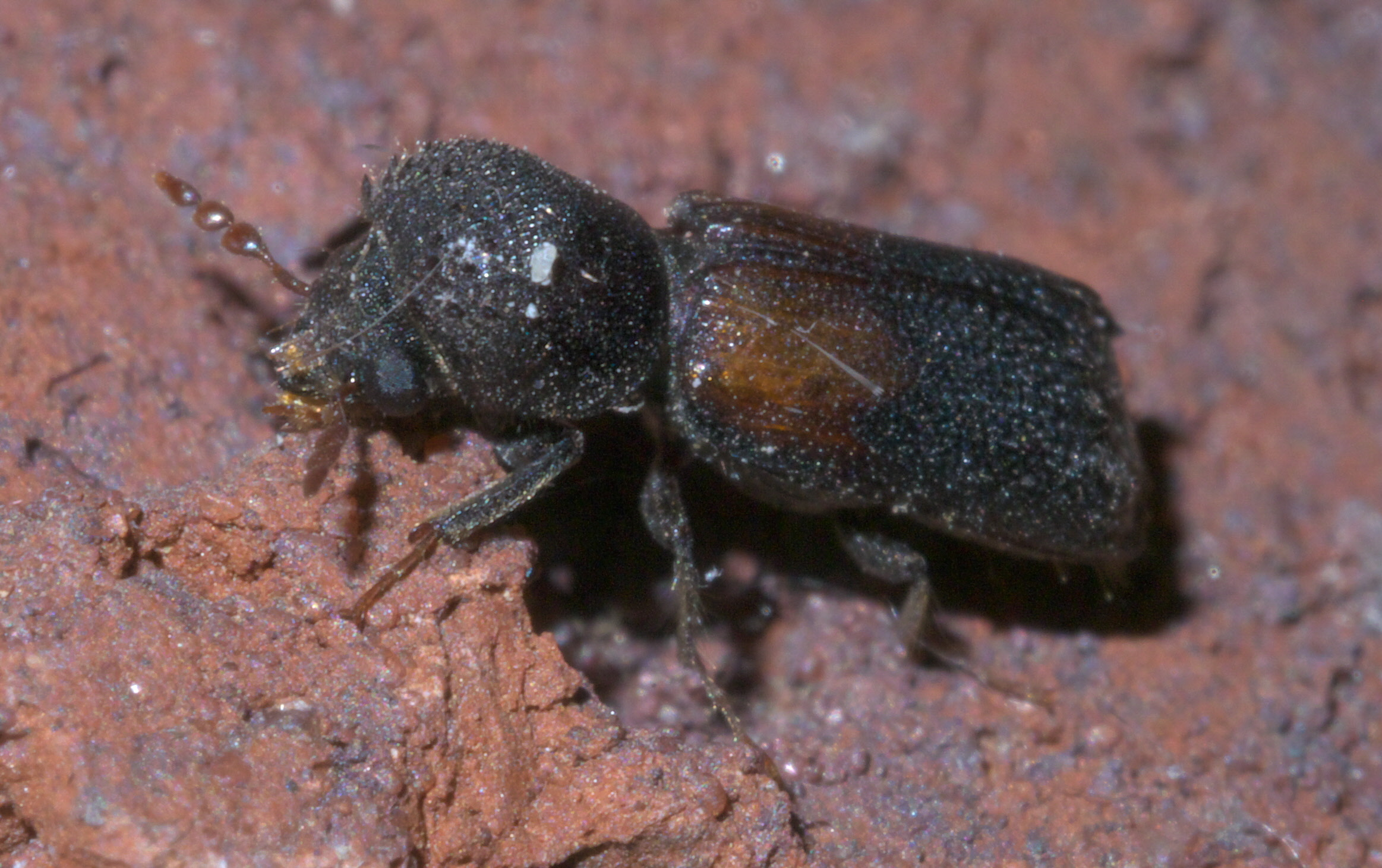
- Xylobiops basilaris

Scientific classification
- Kingdom: Animalia
- Phylum: Arthropoda
- Class: Insecta
- Order: Coleoptera
- Suborder: Polyphaga
- Family: Bostrichidae
- Subfamily: Bostrichinae
- Tribe: Xyloperthini
- Genus: Xylobiops; Casey, 1898

= Xylobiops =

Genus of beetles

Xylobiops is a genus of horned powder-post beetles in the family Bostrichidae. There are about six described species in Xylobiops.

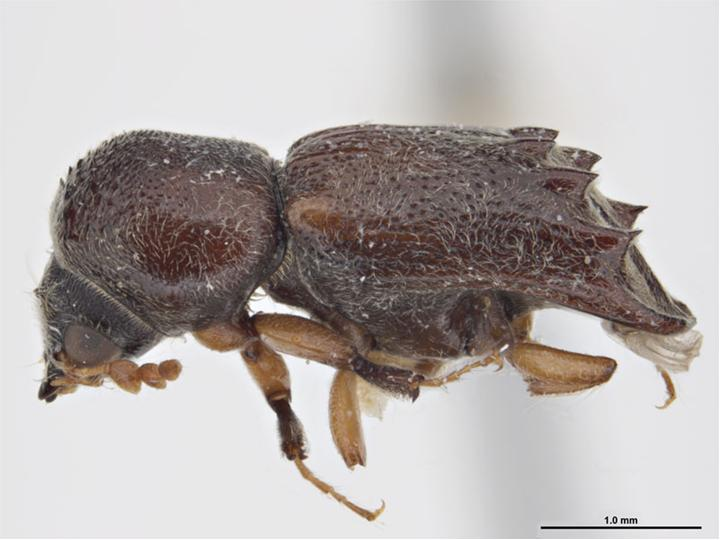
Xylobiops texanus

== Species ==
These six species belong to the genus Xylobiops:

- Xylobiops basilaris (Say, 1824) (red-shouldered bostrichid)
- Xylobiops concisus Lesne, 1901
- Xylobiops lacustre Wickham, 1912
- Xylobiops parilis Lesne, 1901
- Xylobiops sextuberculatus (LeConte, 1858)
- Xylobiops texanus (Horn, 1878)
