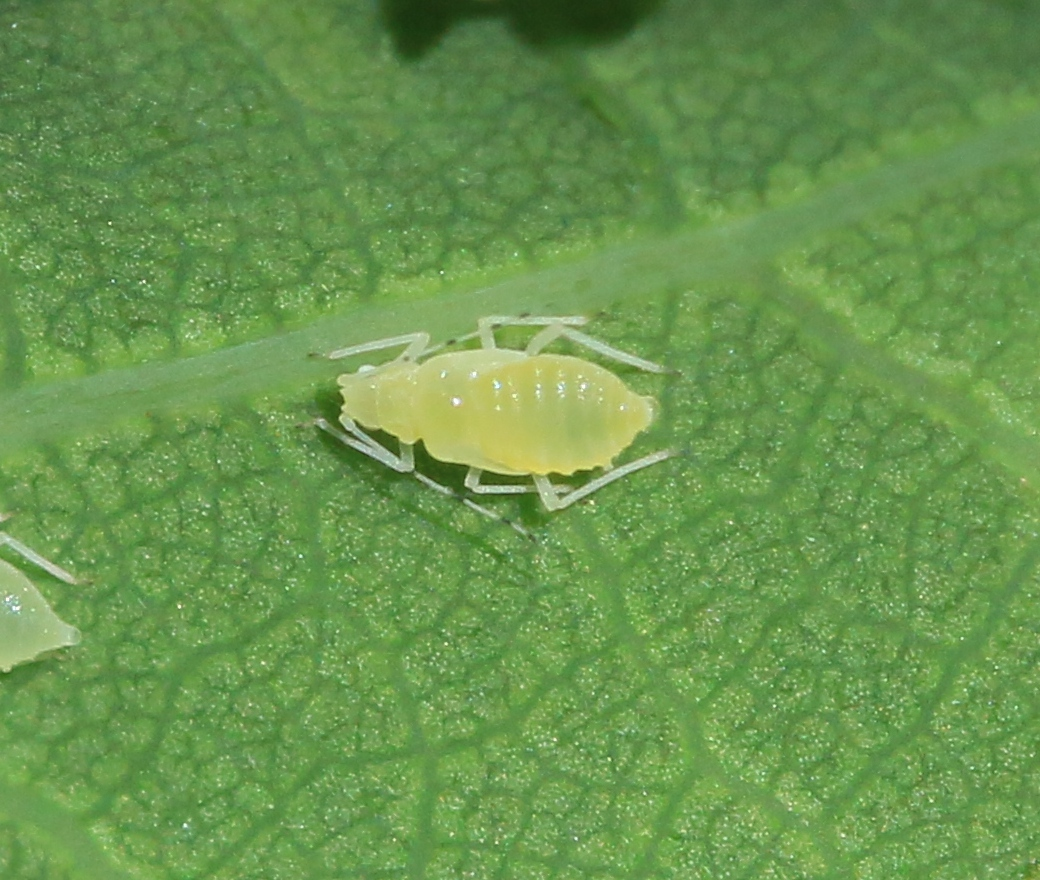
- Tuberculatus_annulatus

Scientific classification
- Kingdom: Animalia
- Phylum: Arthropoda
- Clade: Pancrustacea
- Class: Insecta
- Order: Hemiptera
- Suborder: Sternorrhyncha
- Family: Aphididae
- Subfamily: Calaphidinae
- Tribe: Panaphidini
- Genus: Tuberculatus; Mordvilko, 1894

= Tuberculatus =

Genus of true bugs

Tuberculatus is a genus of aphids belonging to the family Aphididae, and was first described in 1894 by Aleksandr Mordvilko.

The genus has cosmopolitan distribution.

Aphids of this genus feed on trees from the family Fagaceae (beeches, chestnuts, oaks).

Aphids are plant pests and also vectors of plant diseases. Hence, the symbiotic relationships of Tuberculatus species with both ants and bacteria has been extensively studied to discover both their co-evolutionary and ecological relationships.

== Species ==
Species listed by GBIF:

- Tuberculatus acuminatus Zhang, Zhang & Zhong, 1990
- Tuberculatus albosiphonatus Hille Ris Lambers, 1974
- Tuberculatus annulatus (Hartig, 1841)
- Tuberculatus borealis (Krzywiec, 1971)
- Tuberculatus californicus (Baker, 1917)
- Tuberculatus capitatus (Essig & Kuwana, 1918)
- Tuberculatus castanocallis (Zhang & Zhong, 1981)
- Tuberculatus cereus (Zhang & Zhong, 1981)
- Tuberculatus ceroerythros Qiao & Zhang, 2002
- Tuberculatus chrysolepidis Quednau, 1992
- Tuberculatus columbiae Richards, 1965
- Tuberculatus cornutus Richards, 1969
- Tuberculatus eggleri Börner, 1950
- Tuberculatus etruscus Barbagallo & Binazzi, 1991
- Tuberculatus fangi (Tseng & Tao, 1938)
- Tuberculatus fulviabdominalis (Shinji, 1941)
- Tuberculatus fuscotuberculatus Zhang, Zhang & Zhong, 1990
- Tuberculatus garciamartelli Remaudière & Quednau, 1983
- Tuberculatus grisipunctatus Zhang, Zhang & Zhong, 1990
- Tuberculatus higuchii Hille Ris Lambers, 1974
- Tuberculatus indicus Ghosh, 1972
- Tuberculatus inferus Barbagallo, 1990
- Tuberculatus japonicus Higuchi, 1969
- Tuberculatus kashiwae (Matsumura, 1917)
- Tuberculatus kiowanicus Hottes, 1933
- Tuberculatus konaracola (Shinji, 1941)
- Tuberculatus kunugii (Shinji, 1924)
- Tuberculatus kuricola (Matsumura, 1917)
- Tuberculatus leptosiphon Quednau, 1999
- Tuberculatus macrotuberculatus (Essig & Kuwana, 1918)
- Tuberculatus maculipennis Hille Ris Lambers, 1974
- Tuberculatus margituberculatus (Zhang & Zhong, 1981)
- Tuberculatus maureri (Swain, 1918)
- Tuberculatus maximus Hille Ris Lambers, 1974
- Tuberculatus mexicanus Remaudière & Quednau, 1983
- Tuberculatus moerickei Hille Ris Lambers, 1974
- Tuberculatus naganoe (Shinji, 1941)
- Tuberculatus neglectus (Krzywiec, 1966)
- Tuberculatus nervatus Chakrabarti & Raychaudhuri, 1976
- Tuberculatus nigrosiphonaceus (Zhang & Zhang, 1994)
- Tuberculatus paiki Hille Ris Lambers, 1974
- Tuberculatus pallescens Hille Ris Lambers, 1974
- Tuberculatus pallidus (Davidson, 1919)
- Tuberculatus pappus Zhang, Zhang & Zhong, 1990
- Tuberculatus paranaracola Hille Ris Lambers, 1974
- Tuberculatus passalus Quednau, 1992
- Tuberculatus pilosua (Takahashi, 1929)
- Tuberculatus pilosulus Quednau, 1996
- Tuberculatus pilosus (Takahashi, 1929)
- Tuberculatus punctatellus (Fitch, 1855)
- Tuberculatus querceus (Kaltenbach, 1843)
- Tuberculatus quercicola (Matsumura, 1917)
- Tuberculatus quercifolii (Davidson, 1919)
- Tuberculatus querciformosanus (Takahashi, 1921)
- Tuberculatus queriformosa (Takahashi, 1921)
- Tuberculatus radisectuae Zhang, Zhang & Zhong, 1990
- Tuberculatus remaudierei (Nieto Nafría, 1974)
- Tuberculatus spiculatus Richards, 1971
- Tuberculatus stigmatus (Matsumura, 1917)
- Tuberculatus yokoyamai (Takahashi, 1923)
