= Clarence Preston Gillette =

American entomologist

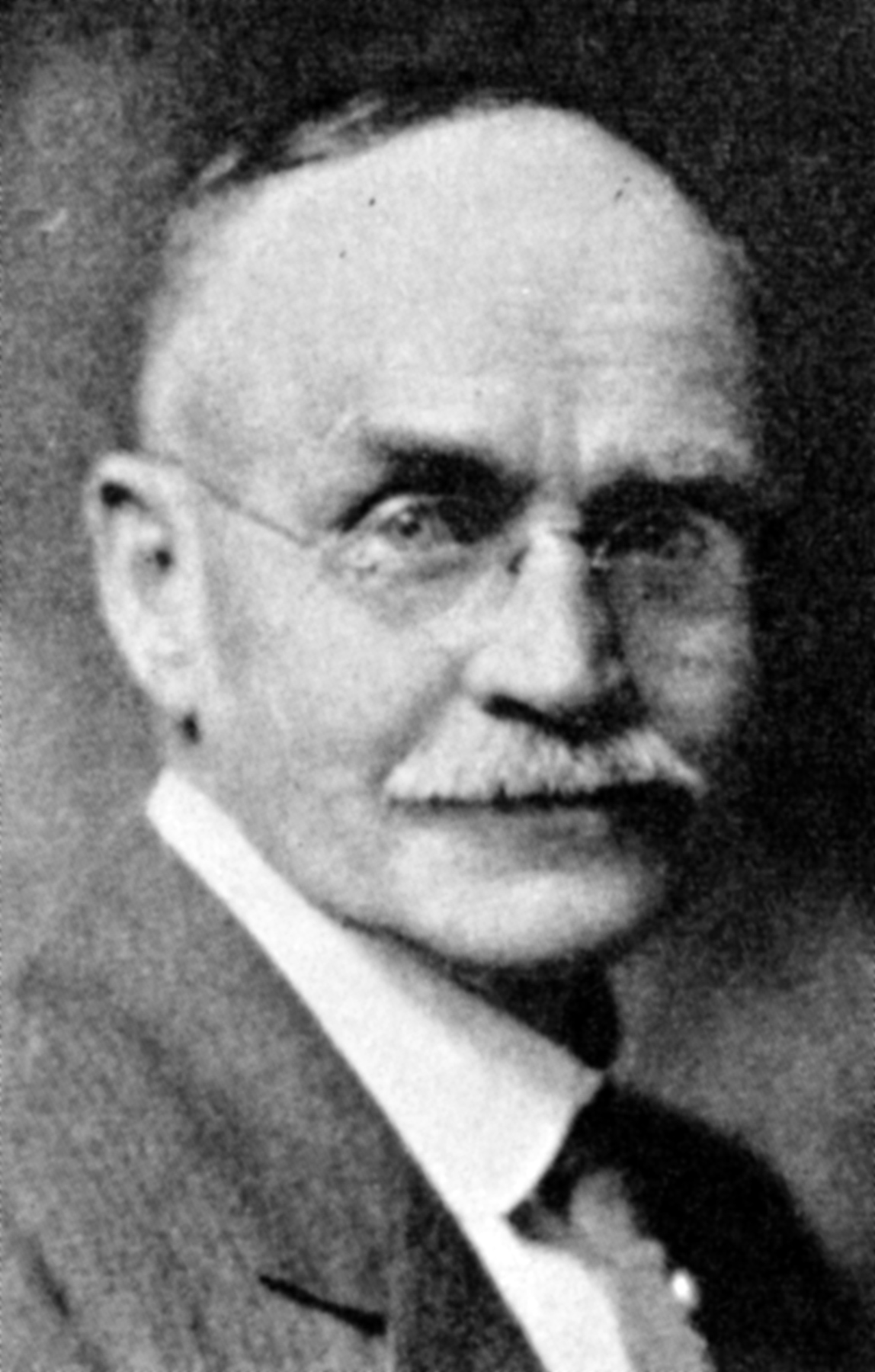
Clarence Preston Gillette.

Clarence Preston Gillette (7 April 1859, in Maple Corners, Ionia County, Michigan – 4 January 1941, in Fort Collins, Colorado) was an American entomologist.

He studied at Michigan State Agricultural College (now Michigan State University) under the direction of Albert John Cook (1842-1916). He first worked as an assistant in the department of zoology there before departing for the experimental station of Iowa State College where he worked from 1888 to 1891. He then took charge of the department of zoology, entomology and physiology of Colorado Agriculture College, today the Colorado State University. The Gillette Museum of Arthropod Diversity at Colorado State University is named after Clarence Gillette.

He worked principally on the taxonomy of the Cynipidae, the Cicadellidae and the Aphidoidea.
