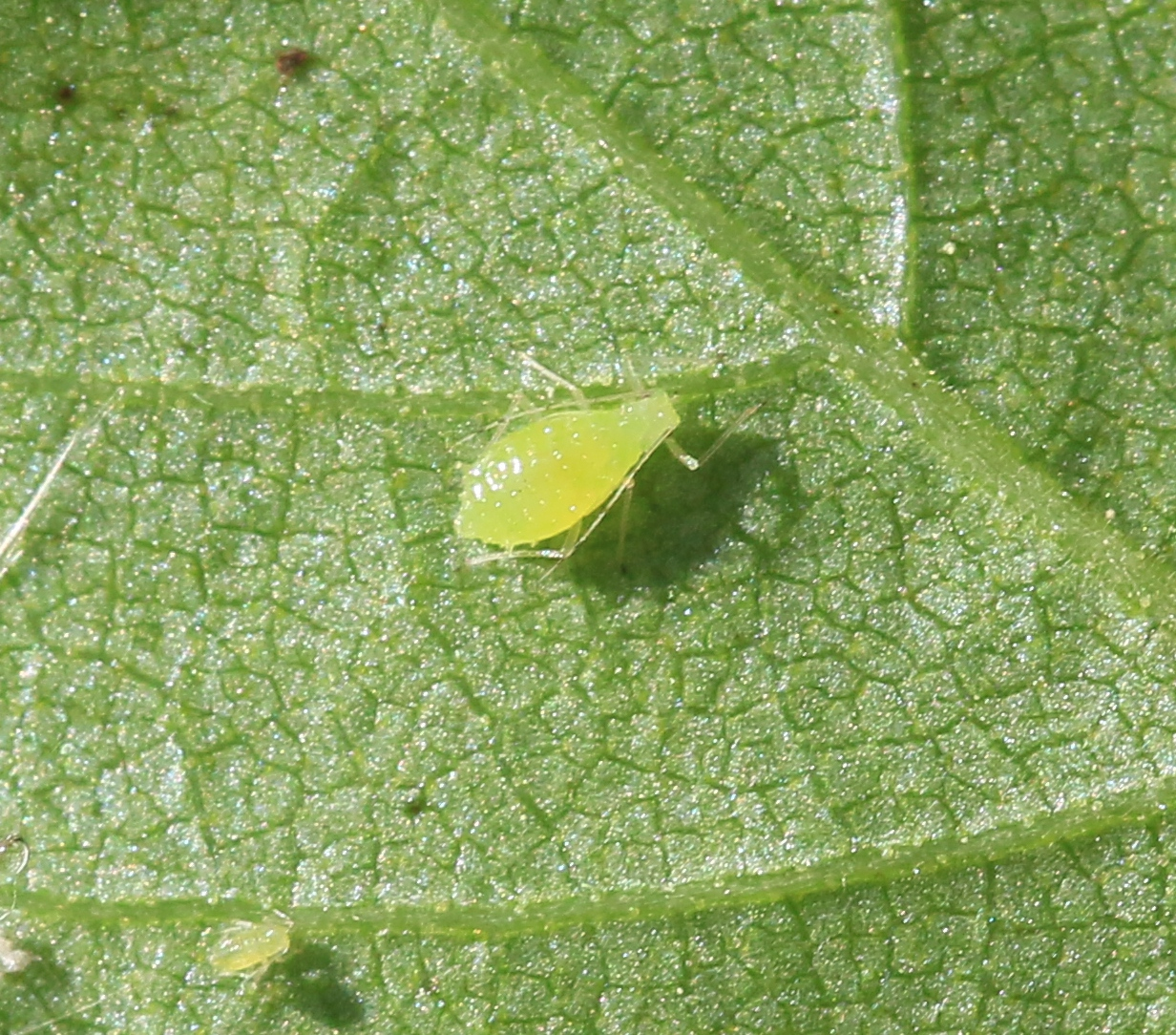

Scientific classification
- Kingdom: Animalia
- Phylum: Arthropoda
- Clade: Pancrustacea
- Class: Insecta
- Order: Hemiptera
- Suborder: Sternorrhyncha
- Family: Aphididae
- Genus: Calaphis
- Species: C. flava

Binomial name
- Calaphis flava Mordvilko, 1928

= Calaphis flava =

Species of aphid

Calaphis flava is an aphid species that was first described by Alexander Mordvilko in 1928.

== Description ==
Individuals are either green or yellow. Winged individuals and females that produce eggs are present from September to November and have a dark head and thorax with dark stripes on the abdomen. The body length of imagines ranges between 1,9-2,7mm.

== Habitat and distribution ==
The aphid inhabits birch trees, predominantly Betula pubescens, across Europe, Asia, South Africa, Australia, and North America. They prefer feeding on young leaves.

== Life cycle ==
The species reproduces parthogenically as well as sexually.

=== Parasitization ===
There are four species of parasitoids which parasitize Calaphis flava.
