= Takecallis =

Scientific classification
- Kingdom: Animalia
- Phylum: Arthropoda
- Clade: Pancrustacea
- Class: Insecta
- Order: Hemiptera
- Suborder: Sternorrhyncha
- Family: Aphididae
- Subfamily: Calaphidinae
- Tribe: Therioaphidini
- Genus: Takecallis; Mastumura, 1917

Type species
- Takecallis arundicolens Mastumura, 1917

Diversity
- About 7 species

Genus of true bugs

Takecallis, commonly known as bamboo aphids, is a genus of aphids belonging to the family Aphididae. The genus contains 7 species. All species are restricted to Southeast Asian countries such as China, India, Japan, Korea and Taiwan. Some species were introduced to Western, African and Oceanian countries.

== Species ==
- Takecallis affinis
- Takecallis alba
- Takecallis arundicolens
- Takecallis arundinariae
- Takecallis assumenta
- Takecallis sasae
- Takecallis taiwana
