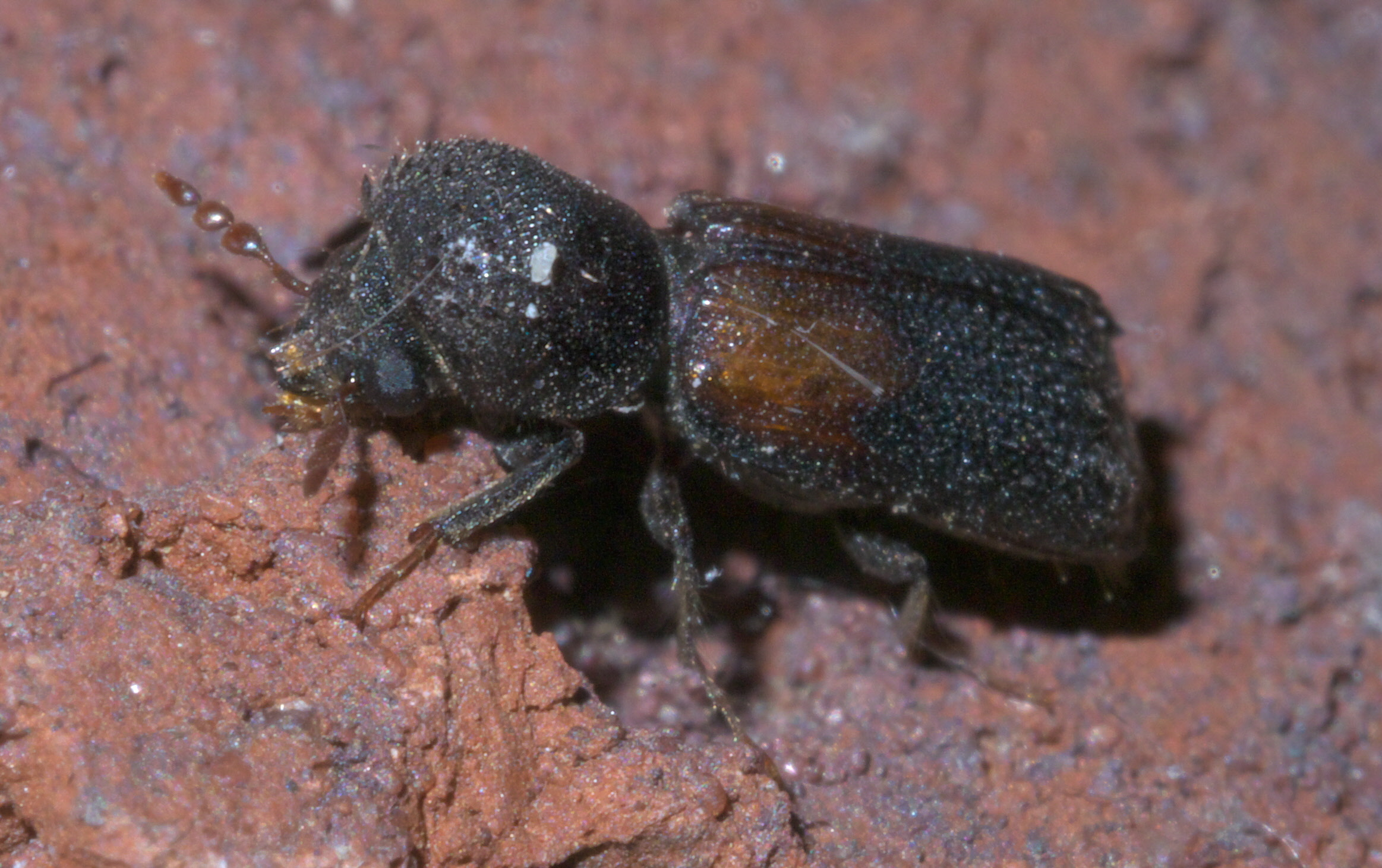

Scientific classification
- Domain: Eukaryota
- Kingdom: Animalia
- Phylum: Arthropoda
- Class: Insecta
- Order: Coleoptera
- Suborder: Polyphaga
- Family: Bostrichidae
- Genus: Xylobiops
- Species: X. basilaris

Binomial name
- Xylobiops basilaris (Say, 1824)

= Xylobiops basilaris =

Species of beetle

Xylobiops basilaris, the red-shouldered bostrichid, is a species of horned powder-post beetle in the family Bostrichidae. It is found in Europe and Northern Asia (excluding China) and North America.

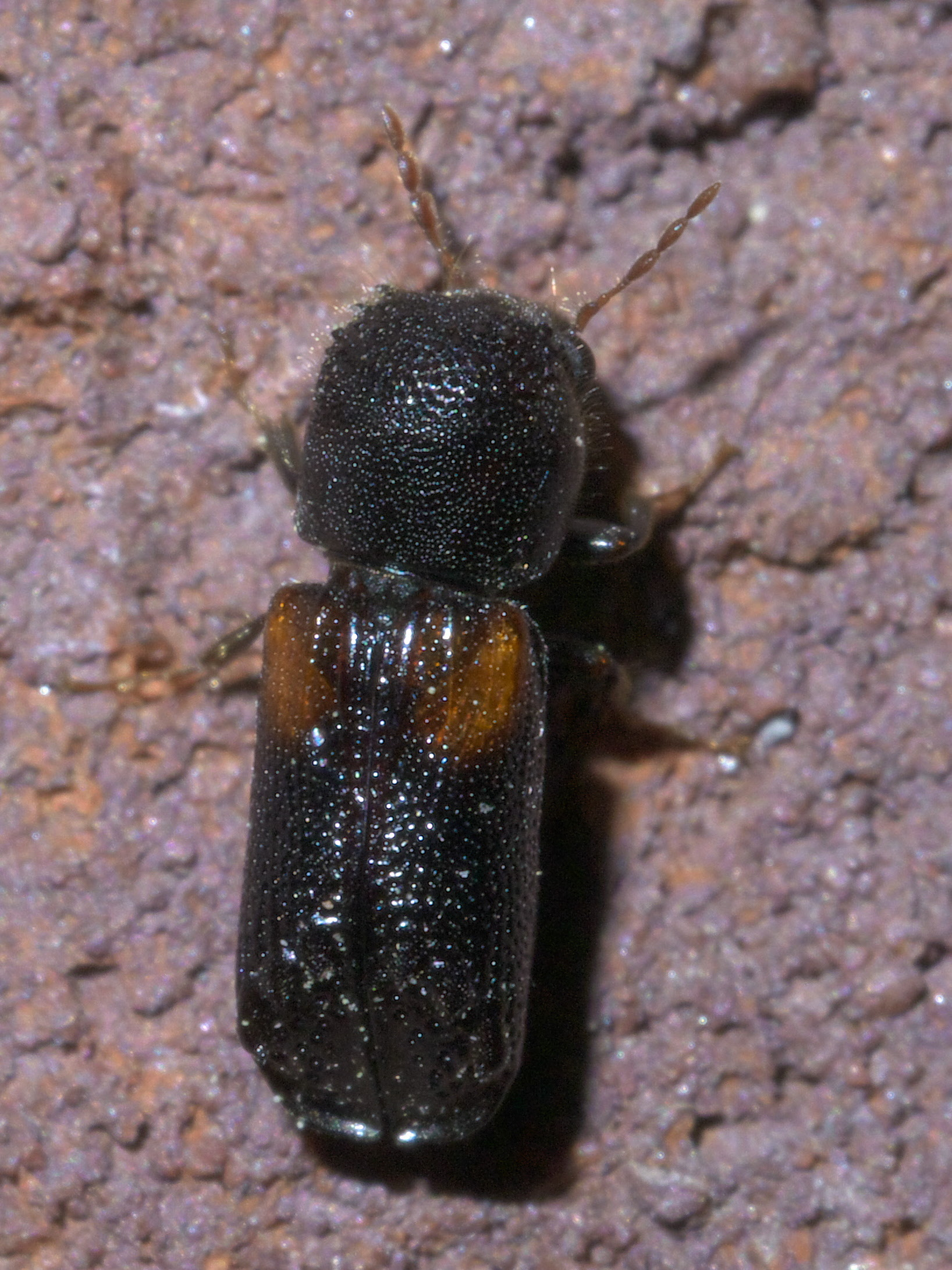
Red-shouldered bostrichid, Xylobiops basilaris

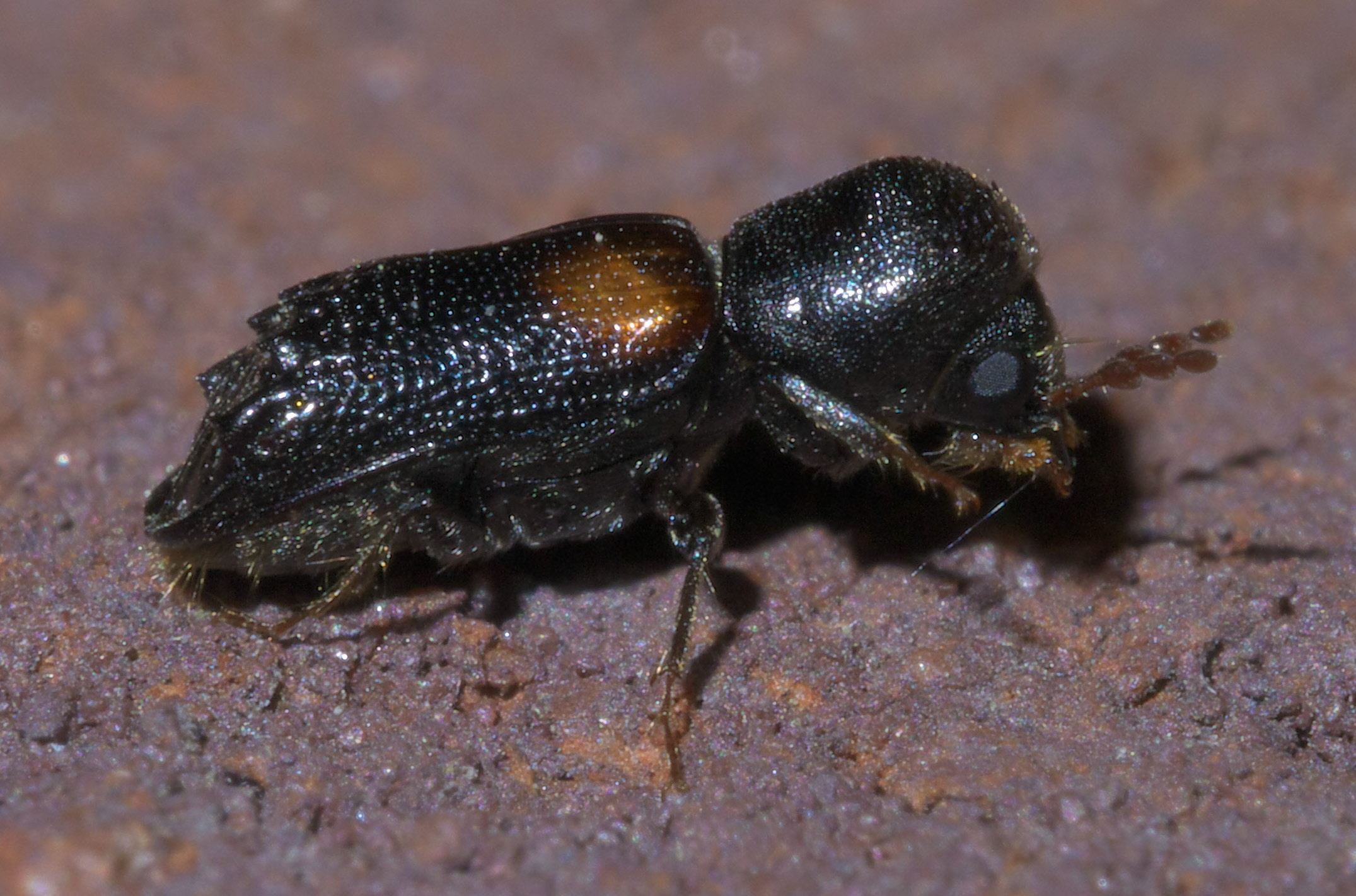
Red-shouldered bostrichid, Xylobiops basilaris
