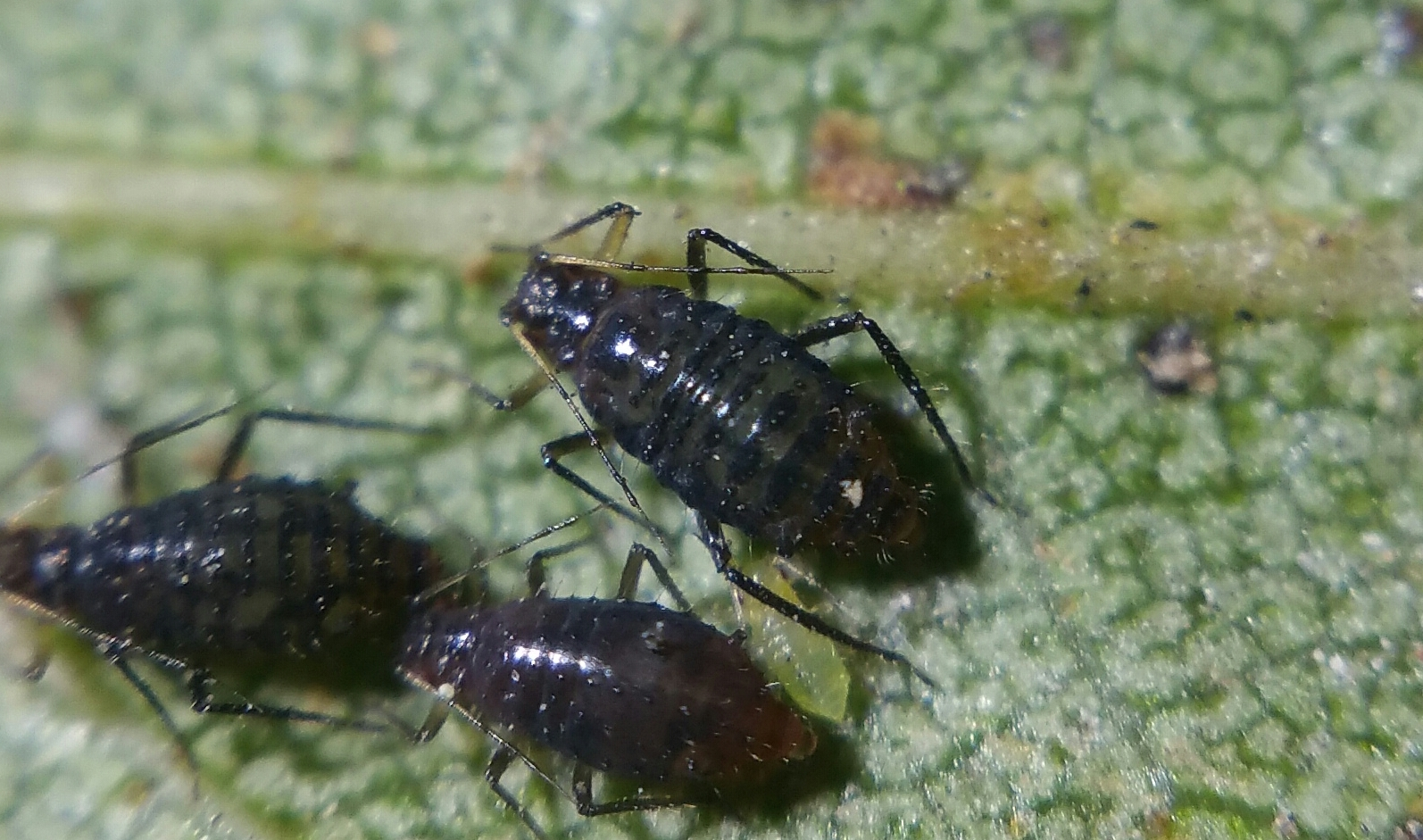
- Callipterinella calliptera

Scientific classification
- Domain: Eukaryota
- Kingdom: Animalia
- Phylum: Arthropoda
- Class: Insecta
- Order: Hemiptera
- Suborder: Sternorrhyncha
- Family: Aphididae
- Genus: Callipterinella; Goot, 1913

= Callipterinella =

Genus of true bugs

Callipterinella is a genus of true bugs belonging to the family Aphididae. The species of this genus are found in Europe and North America.

== Species ==
The following species are recognised in the genus Callipterinella:

- Callipterinella calliptera (Hartig, 1841)
- Callipterinella minutissima (Stroyan, 1953)
- Callipterinella tuberculata (Heyden, 1837)
