= Clethrobius =

Scientific classification
- Kingdom: Animalia
- Phylum: Arthropoda
- Class: Insecta
- Order: Hemiptera
- Suborder: Sternorrhyncha
- Family: Aphididae
- Subtribe: Calaphidina
- Genus: Clethrobius; Mordvilko, 1928

Synonyms
- Clethrobus Qiao, Jiang & Zhang, 2003; Cletrobius Pashtshenko, 1984

Genus of true bugs

Clethrobius is a genus of true bugs belonging to the family Aphididae.

The genus was first described by Mordvilko in 1928.

The species of this genus are found in Europe.

Species include:

- Clethrobius comes (Walker, 1848)
