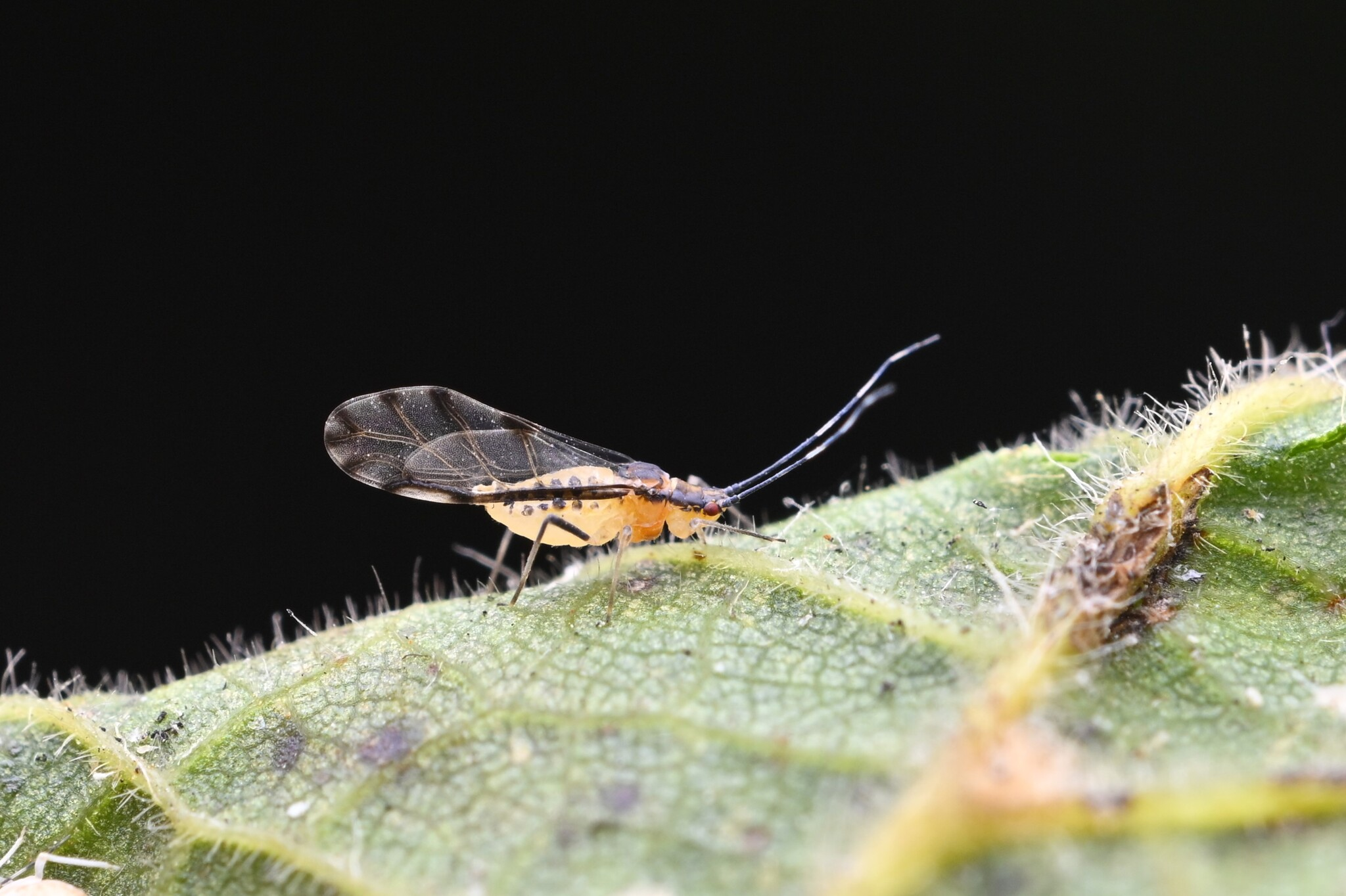
- Eucallipterus tiliae

Scientific classification
- Domain: Eukaryota
- Kingdom: Animalia
- Phylum: Arthropoda
- Class: Insecta
- Order: Hemiptera
- Suborder: Sternorrhyncha
- Family: Aphididae
- Genus: Eucallipterus; Schouteden, 1906

= Eucallipterus =

Genus of true bugs

Eucallipterus is a genus of true bugs belonging to the family Aphididae.

The species of this genus are found in Europe, Australia and North America.

Species:

- Eucallipterus tiliae (Linnaeus, 1758)
- Eucallipterus tilicola
