= Symydobius =

Scientific classification
- Domain: Eukaryota
- Kingdom: Animalia
- Phylum: Arthropoda
- Class: Insecta
- Order: Hemiptera
- Suborder: Sternorrhyncha
- Family: Aphididae
- Genus: Symydobius; Mordvilko, 1894

Genus of true bugs

Symydobius is a genus of true bugs belonging to the family Aphididae.

The species of this genus are found in Europe and Northern America.

Species:

- Symydobius alniarius (Matsumura, 1917)
- Symydobius americanus Baker, 1918
