= Betulaphis =

Scientific classification
- Domain: Eukaryota
- Kingdom: Animalia
- Phylum: Arthropoda
- Class: Insecta
- Order: Hemiptera
- Suborder: Sternorrhyncha
- Family: Aphididae
- Genus: Betulaphis; Glendenning, 1926

Genus of true bugs

Betulaphis is a genus of true bugs belonging to the family Aphididae.

== Species ==
The following species are recognised in the genus :

- Betulaphis brevipilosa Börner, 1940
- Betulaphis hissarica Narzikulov, 1963
- Betulaphis kozlovi Wegierek, 2019
- Betulaphis longicornis Quednau & Samiran Chakrabarti, 1980
- Betulaphis pelei Hille Ris Lambers, 1952
- Betulaphis quadrituberculata (Kaltenbach, 1843)
- BOLD:AAI4153 (Betulaphis sp.)
