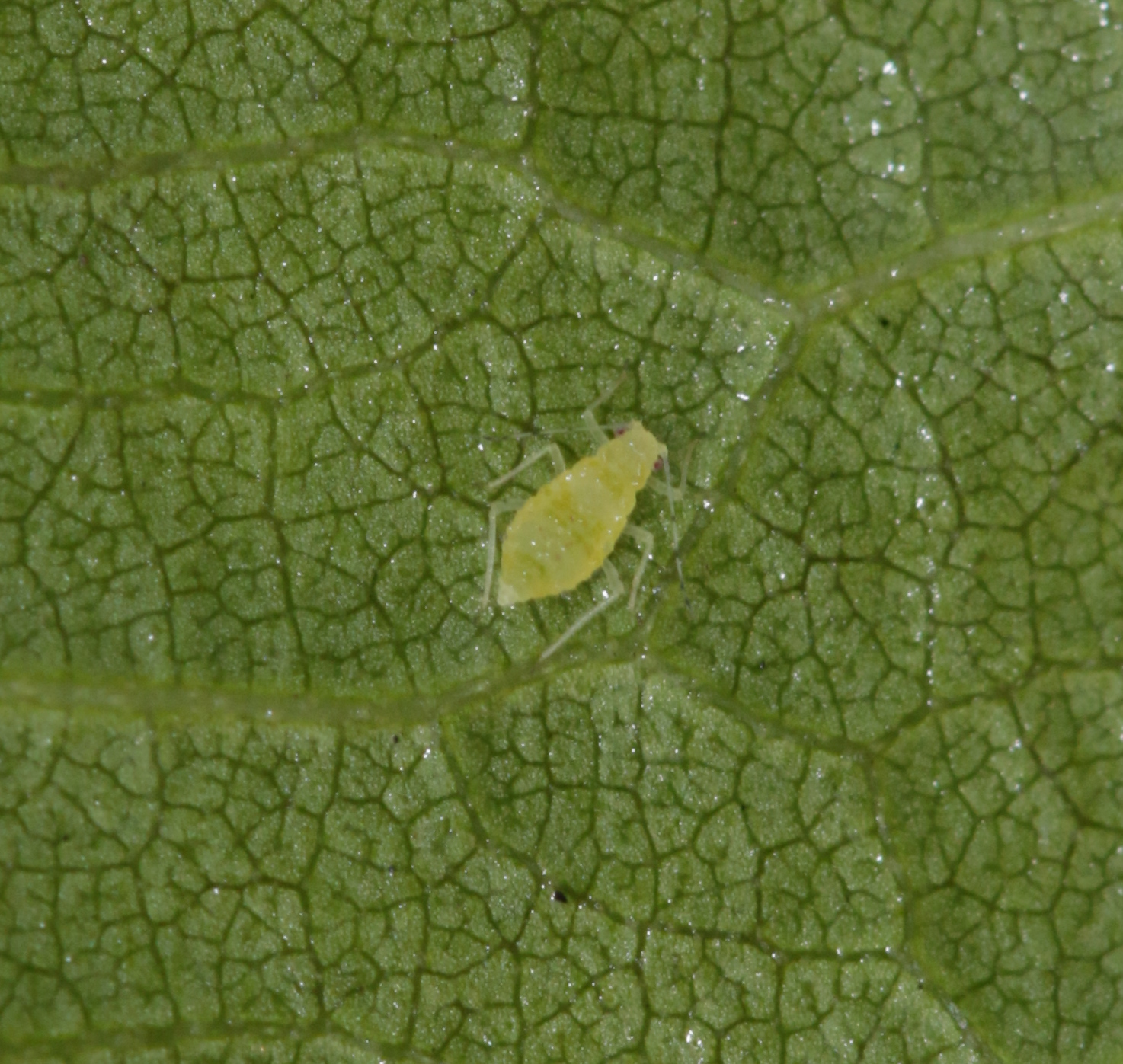
- Pterocallis Alni aphid

Scientific classification
- Domain: Eukaryota
- Kingdom: Animalia
- Phylum: Arthropoda
- Class: Insecta
- Order: Hemiptera
- Suborder: Sternorrhyncha
- Family: Aphididae
- Genus: Pterocallis; Passerini, 1860

= Pterocallis =

Genus of true bugs

Pterocallis is a genus of true bugs belonging to the family Aphididae.

The species of this genus are found in Europe, Northern America and New Zealand.

Species:

- Pterocallis affinis
- Pterocallis albida Börner, 1940
