= Monellia =

Scientific classification
- Domain: Eukaryota
- Kingdom: Animalia
- Phylum: Arthropoda
- Class: Insecta
- Order: Hemiptera
- Suborder: Sternorrhyncha
- Family: Aphididae
- Genus: Monellia

Genus of insects

Monellia is a genus of true bugs belonging to the family Aphididae.

The species of this genus are found in Northern America.

Species:

- Monellia caryella (Fitch, 1855)
- Monellia hispida Quednau, 1971
- Monellia maculella (Fitch, 1855)
- Monellia medina Bissell, 1978
- Monellia microsetosa Richards, 1960
