= Carinaulus milaninikodymi =

Scientific classification
- Kingdom: Animalia
- Phylum: Arthropoda
- Clade: Pancrustacea
- Class: Insecta
- Order: Coleoptera
- Suborder: Polyphaga
- Infraorder: Scarabaeiformia
- Family: Scarabaeidae
- Genus: Carinaulus
- Species: C. milaninikodymi

Binomial name
- Carinaulus milaninikodymi (Červenka, 2000)

Synonyms
- Aphodius (Carinaulus) milaninikodymi Červenka, 2000

Species of beetle

Carinaulus milaninikodymi is a species of beetle of the family Scarabaeidae. It is found in China (Qinghai).

== Description ==
Adults reach a length of about 6.4–6.8 mm (0.25–0.27 in). They have an elongate-oval, weakly convex, glabrous, red-brown body. The legs are brown.

== Etymology ==
The species is named in honour of Glaphyridae specialist Milan Nikodým.
