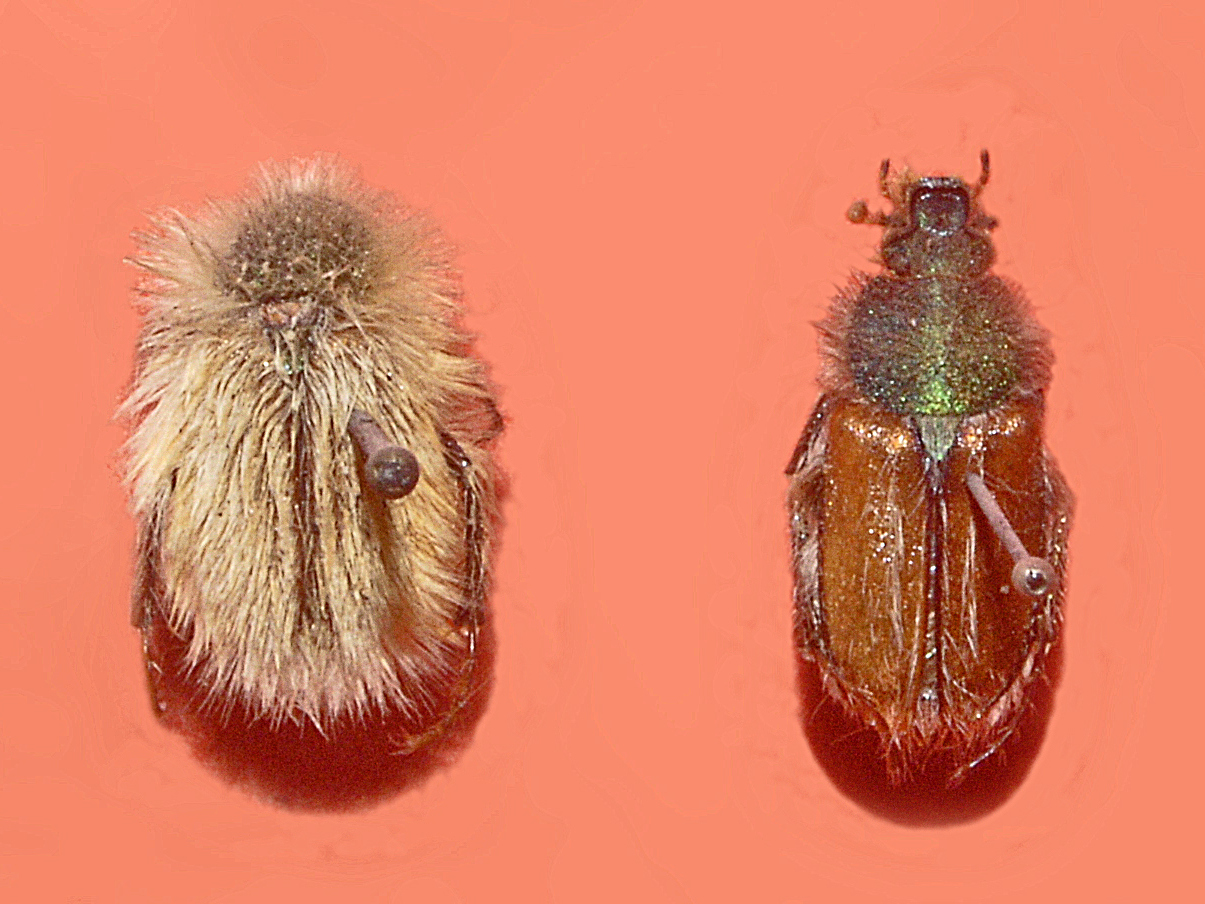
- Pygopleurus vulpes, male and female. Museum specimen

Scientific classification
- Kingdom: Animalia
- Phylum: Arthropoda
- Class: Insecta
- Order: Coleoptera
- Suborder: Polyphaga
- Infraorder: Scarabaeiformia
- Family: Glaphyridae
- Genus: Pygopleurus
- Species: P. vulpes

Binomial name
- Pygopleurus vulpes (Fabricius, 1781)

= Pygopleurus vulpes =

Species of beetle

Pygopleurus vulpes is a species of beetles from the Glaphyridae family.

== Description ==
Pygopleurus vulpes can reach a length of 12–14 millimetres (0.47–0.55 in). The males of these beetles are completely covered by long hairs. They do not show variability of integuments and setae, but their color ranges from the common straw-yellow color to reddish and dark orange color. In the females the pronotum is greenish and the brown elytrae remain visible.

== Distribution ==
This species is present in Albania, Bulgaria, Greece, North Macedonia, Romania, Russia and Ukraine.

== Bibliography ==
- Miksic R. (1955) Bemerkungen über die Variabilität einiger Amphicoma-Arten, Fragmenta Balcanica Musei Macedonici Scientiarum Naturalium. Skopje 1(20):175-179
- Truqui E. (1848) Amphicoma et Eulasia insectorum coleopterorum genera, Studi Entomologia :1-48
- Fabricius J.C. (1781) Species insectorum, exhibentes eorum differentias specificas, synonyma auctorum, loca natalia, metamorphosian, adiectis observationibus, descriptionibus. Tom.I, Carol.Ernest.Bohnii, Hamburgi et Kilonii, VIII:1-552
- Pallas P.S. (1781) Icones Insectorum praesertim Rossiae Siberiaeque pecularium quae collegit et Descriptionibus illustravit, Walther. Erlangae:1-96
- Fabricius J.C. (1792) Entomologia systematica emendata et aucta. Secundum Classes, Ordines, Genera, Species adjectis Synonimis, Locis, Observationibus, Descriptionibus, Hafniae. C. G. Proft & fils 1:1-538
- Scarabs: World Scarabaeidae Database. Schoolmeesters P.
