= Lichnanthe rathvoni =

Scientific classification
- Domain: Eukaryota
- Kingdom: Animalia
- Phylum: Arthropoda
- Class: Insecta
- Order: Coleoptera
- Suborder: Polyphaga
- Infraorder: Scarabaeiformia
- Family: Glaphyridae
- Genus: Lichnanthe
- Species: L. rathvoni

Binomial name
- Lichnanthe rathvoni (LeConte, 1863)

Synonyms
- Lichnanthe canina Horn, 1867; Lichnanthe edwardsi Horn, 1870

Species of beetle

Lichnanthe rathvoni is a species of bumble bee scarab beetle in the family Glaphyridae. It is found in North America. The species is named for Simon Rathvon, a 19th-century American entomologist.
