= Rathvon =

Rathvon is a name. Notable people with the name include:

== Given name ==
- Rathvon M. Tompkins (1912–1999), American Marine general

== Surnames ==
- Henry Rathvon, with Emily Cox, an American husband and wife puzzle writing team
- Simon Snyder Rathvon (1812–1891), American entomologist
- William R. Rathvon (1854–1939), businessman and author of an audio recording with his impressions of the Gettysburg Address
