= Lichnanthe vulpina =

Scientific classification
- Domain: Eukaryota
- Kingdom: Animalia
- Phylum: Arthropoda
- Class: Insecta
- Order: Coleoptera
- Suborder: Polyphaga
- Infraorder: Scarabaeiformia
- Family: Glaphyridae
- Genus: Lichnanthe
- Species: L. vulpina

Binomial name
- Lichnanthe vulpina (Hentz, 1827)

Species of beetle

Lichnanthe vulpina, known generally as the cranberry root grub or bumblebee scarab, is a species of bumble bee scarab beetle in the family Glaphyridae. It is found in North America.
