= Lytta rathvoni =

Scientific classification
- Domain: Eukaryota
- Kingdom: Animalia
- Phylum: Arthropoda
- Class: Insecta
- Order: Coleoptera
- Suborder: Polyphaga
- Infraorder: Cucujiformia
- Family: Meloidae
- Genus: Lytta
- Species: L. rathvoni

Binomial name
- Lytta rathvoni Leconte, 1853

Species of beetle

Lytta rathvoni is a species of blister beetle in the family Meloidae. It is found in North America. The species is named for Simon Rathvon, a 19th-century American entomologist.
