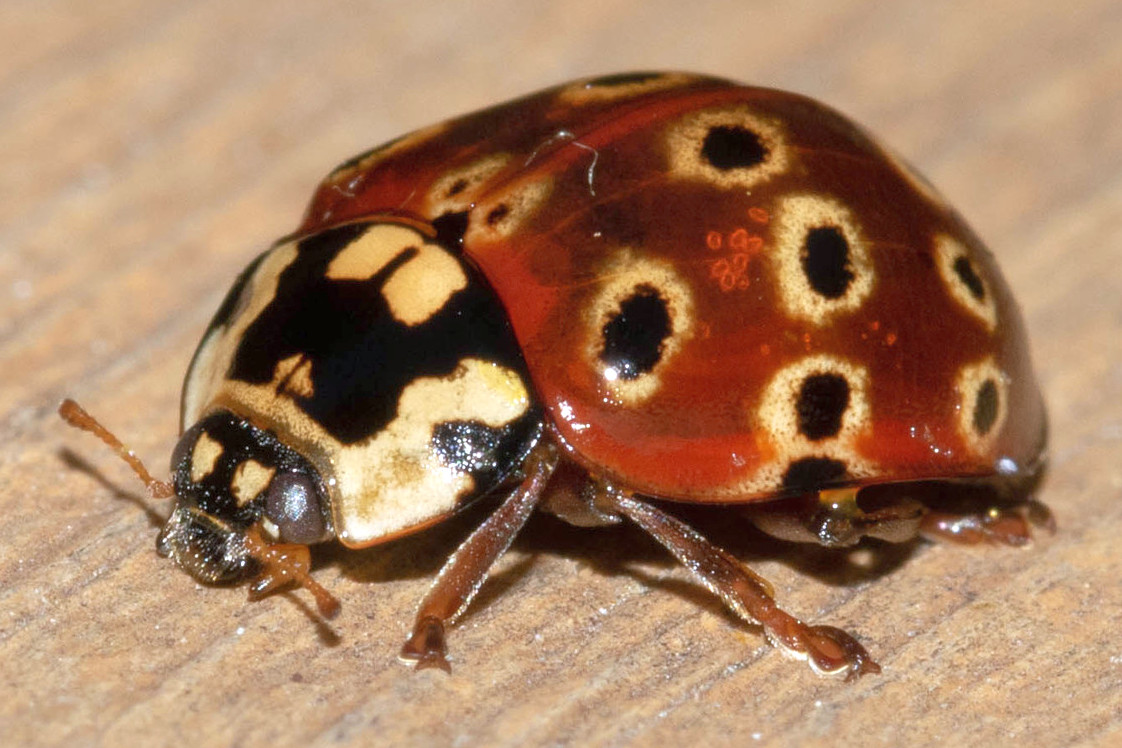

Scientific classification
- Kingdom: Animalia
- Phylum: Arthropoda
- Clade: Pancrustacea
- Class: Insecta
- Order: Coleoptera
- Suborder: Polyphaga
- Infraorder: Cucujiformia
- Family: Coccinellidae
- Genus: Anatis
- Species: A. mali

Binomial name
- Anatis mali (Say, 1825)

Synonyms
- Coccinella mali Say, 1824; Anatis borealis Belicek, 1976; Anatis signaticollis Mulsant, 1850

= Anatis mali =

Species of beetle

Anatis mali (also known as the eye-spotted lady beetle), is a species of lady beetle in the family Coccinellidae. It is found in North America, where it has been recorded from Ontario to British Columbia, south to Virginia and Oregon.

== Description ==
Adults reach a length of about 7.3-10 mm. Adults are yellow to brownish red with black markings.

== Biology ==
Anatis mali is a crucial specialized aphid predator in the balsam tree plantation system, a rotation lasting about ten years for balsam trees to grow as Christmas trees under local temperature conditions. There is significant potential for using Anatis mali in biological management on pre-harvest trees where visual damage maintenance is not essential. On average, reared A. mali required 296 aphids to complete larval development and pupate.
