= Carinaulus meghalayensis =

Scientific classification
- Kingdom: Animalia
- Phylum: Arthropoda
- Clade: Pancrustacea
- Class: Insecta
- Order: Coleoptera
- Suborder: Polyphaga
- Infraorder: Scarabaeiformia
- Family: Scarabaeidae
- Genus: Carinaulus
- Species: C. meghalayensis

Binomial name
- Carinaulus meghalayensis (Červenka, 2000)

Synonyms
- Aphodius (Carinaulus) meghalayensis Červenka, 2000

Species of beetle

Carinaulus meghalayensis is a species of beetle of the family Scarabaeidae. It is found in India (Meghalaya).

== Description ==
Adults reach a length of about 4.6–5.9 mm (0.18–0.23 in). They have a convex, glabrous body, with the head and pronotum dull and the elytra weakly glossy. They are yellowish-brown, with the disc of the pronotum brown. The elytra have an irregular black-brown marking. The anterior legs are light brown, while the rest of the legs are darker brown.

== Etymology ==
The species is named after the Indian state Meghalaya.
