= Lichnanthe =

Scientific classification
- Kingdom: Animalia
- Phylum: Arthropoda
- Class: Insecta
- Order: Coleoptera
- Suborder: Polyphaga
- Infraorder: Scarabaeiformia
- Family: Glaphyridae
- Genus: Lichnanthe; Burmeister, 1844

Synonyms
- Dasydera LeConte, 1861

Genus of beetles

Lichnanthe is a genus of bumble bee scarab beetles in the family Glaphyridae. There are about 10 described species in Lichnanthe.

== Species ==
These 10 species belong to the genus Lichnanthe:

- Lichnanthe albipilosa Carlson, 1980
- Lichnanthe apina Carlson, 1980
- Lichnanthe brachyscelis Carlson, 1980
- Lichnanthe cooperi (Horn, 1867)
- Lichnanthe defuncta (Wickham, 1910)
- Lichnanthe lupina LeConte, 1856
- Lichnanthe rathvoni (LeConte, 1863)
- Lichnanthe ursina (LeConte, 1861) (bumblebee scarab)
- Lichnanthe vulpina (Hentz, 1827) (cranberry root grub)
