= Carinaulus dierli =

Scientific classification
- Kingdom: Animalia
- Phylum: Arthropoda
- Clade: Pancrustacea
- Class: Insecta
- Order: Coleoptera
- Suborder: Polyphaga
- Infraorder: Scarabaeiformia
- Family: Scarabaeidae
- Genus: Carinaulus
- Species: C. dierli

Binomial name
- Carinaulus dierli (Balthasar, 1967)

Synonyms
- Aphodius (Carinaulus) dierli Balthasar, 1967

Species of beetle

Carinaulus dierli is a species of beetle of the family Scarabaeidae. It is found in Nepal.

== Description ==
Adults reach a length of about 5.5–6 mm (0.22–0.24 in). They have a black, dull, matte body, with the sides of the pronotum and the elytra covered with fine pubescence. The legs are blackish-brown.
