= Carinaulus imitabilis =

Scientific classification
- Kingdom: Animalia
- Phylum: Arthropoda
- Clade: Pancrustacea
- Class: Insecta
- Order: Coleoptera
- Suborder: Polyphaga
- Infraorder: Scarabaeiformia
- Family: Scarabaeidae
- Genus: Carinaulus
- Species: C. imitabilis

Binomial name
- Carinaulus imitabilis (Červenka, 2000)

Synonyms
- Aphodius (Carinaulus) imitabilis Červenka, 2000

Species of beetle

Carinaulus imitabilis is a species of beetle of the family Scarabaeidae. It is found in China (Yunnan).

== Description ==
Adults reach a length of about 4.8–6.2 mm (0.19–0.24 in). They have a convex, silky body. The forebody is black, but the sides of the pronotum have a brown border, and the elytra are dark black-brown. There are glossy black punctures on the pronotum, and the striae and sutural intervals of the elytra are also glossy black. There are tiny hairs on the elytral intervals and on the pronotum. The legs are black-brown.

== Etymology ==
The species name is derived from Latin imitabilis (meaning imitating) and refers to the similarities with other Carinaulus species with regard to the structure of the head and pronotum.
