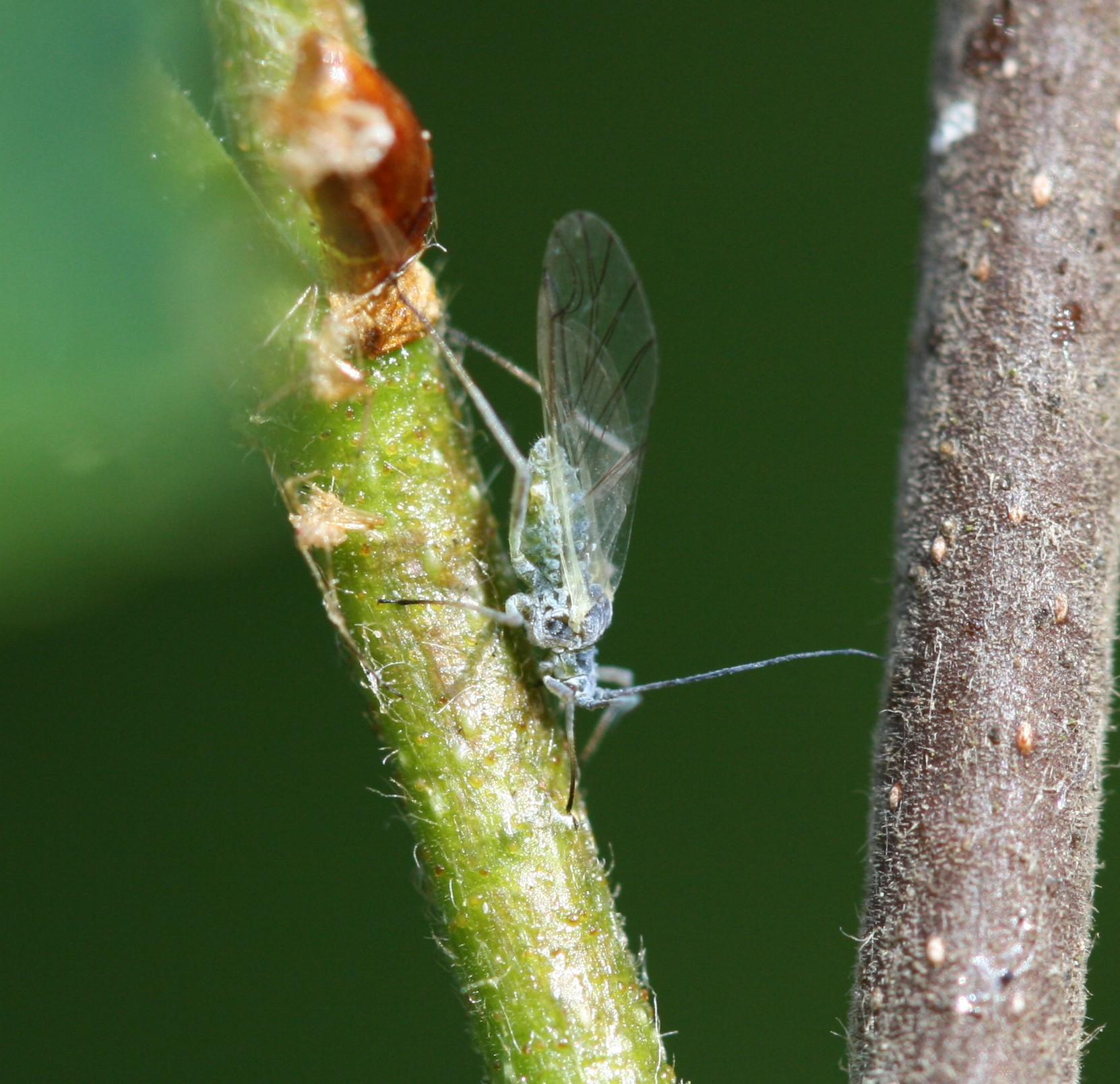

Scientific classification
- Kingdom: Animalia
- Phylum: Arthropoda
- Class: Insecta
- Order: Hemiptera
- Suborder: Sternorrhyncha
- Family: Aphididae
- Genus: Euceraphis
- Species: E. betulae

Binomial name
- Euceraphis betulae (Koch, 1855)

= Euceraphis betulae =

Species of true bug

Euceraphis betulae, the birch aphid or silver birch aphid, is a species of aphid in the order Hemiptera. It is a tiny green insect with a soft body and wings. It is found living on the European silver birch tree (Betula pendula) where it feeds and multiplies on the buds and leaves by sucking sap.

== Description ==
The silver birch aphid is a light green colour with a bluish tinge. The blueness is due to the dusting of blue wax particles which are particularly obvious on the antennae and legs. All adults have membranous wings and during the spring and summer, all individuals are female. The mouthparts are specialised to form a slender stylet for piercing and sucking sap from their host tree.

== Biology ==
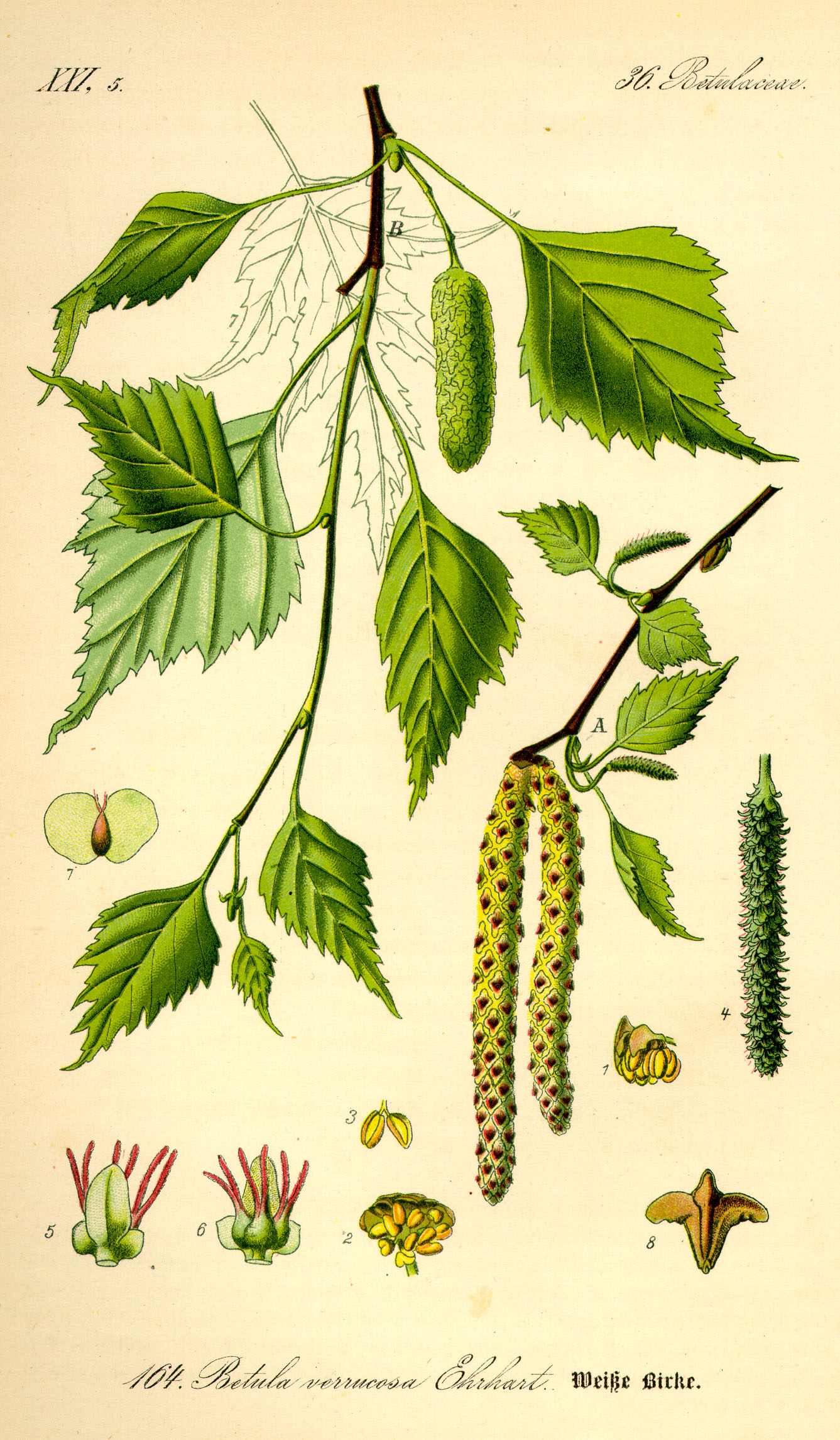
Silver birch leaves, catkins, fruits and seed

Eggs that have overwintered on birch twigs hatch out in the spring. The nymphs feed on the leaf buds as they burst and on tender young leaves. They grow rapidly into winged females that, as soon as they are adults, start to reproduce by parthenogenesis, producing live young. This new generation develops into further winged females and the numbers of aphids soon builds up. They take to the wing rapidly if disturbed. Some fly to nearby silver birches and others to other parts of the same tree but by about July they stop reproducing. In September the birch leaves begin to turn yellow and the aphids resume reproduction and further nymphs are born viviparously. As the days shorten, there is a change in the reproductive pattern. The next generation of adults produced consists of greyish, winged males and brown, winged egg-laying females. After mating, the females lay batches of orange eggs on birch twigs. The adults die off and the eggs soon turn to a glossy black colour. They are able to withstand harsh winter weather and hatch in the spring when the tree is about to resume growth.

== Ecology ==
Like many other species of aphid, Euceraphis betulae is very specific as to the identity of its host. The silver birch is an ornamental tree native to Europe which has been introduced into North America, Australia, New Zealand and other parts of the world and the aphid has travelled with it. The aphid has not adapted to colonise other species of birch native to these countries. In Europe, the closely related downy birch (Betula pubescens) has its own species of aphid, Euceraphis punctipennis. At one time this was thought to be identical to Euceraphis betulae but there have been found to be chromosomal differences between the two, and they are now considered to be separate species.

Ladybirds and their larvae feed on aphids. In America the eyed ladybird (Anatis ocellata) specialises on the aphids colonising various trees. Their diets include the silver birch aphid and pine aphids. The cream-spot ladybird (Calvia quatuordecimguttata) also feeds on Euceraphis betulae.
