= Carinaulus gansuicus =

Scientific classification
- Kingdom: Animalia
- Phylum: Arthropoda
- Clade: Pancrustacea
- Class: Insecta
- Order: Coleoptera
- Suborder: Polyphaga
- Infraorder: Scarabaeiformia
- Family: Scarabaeidae
- Genus: Carinaulus
- Species: C. gansuicus

Binomial name
- Carinaulus gansuicus (Červenka, 2000)

Synonyms
- Aphodius (Carinaulus) gansuicus Červenka, 2000

Species of beetle

Carinaulus gansuicus is a species of beetle of the family Scarabaeidae. It is found in China (Gansu, Sichuan).

== Description ==
Adults reach a length of about 5.8–6.4 mm (0.23–0.25 in). They have a convex, black to brown-black body, while the sides of the clypeus and pronotum are reddish. The pronotum, disc of the clypeus and elytral have a vague, silky shine, while the lateral and anterior areas of the clypeus and elytral intervals are shining.

== Etymology ==
The species is named after Gansu province in China.
