= Carinaulus dundarum =

Scientific classification
- Kingdom: Animalia
- Phylum: Arthropoda
- Clade: Pancrustacea
- Class: Insecta
- Order: Coleoptera
- Suborder: Polyphaga
- Infraorder: Scarabaeiformia
- Family: Scarabaeidae
- Genus: Carinaulus
- Species: C. dundarum

Binomial name
- Carinaulus dundarum (Červenka, 2000)

Synonyms
- Aphodius (Carinaulus) dundarum Červenka, 2000

Species of beetle

Carinaulus dundarum is a species of beetle of the family Scarabaeidae. It is found in China (Sichuan).

== Description ==
Adults reach a length of about 6.7 mm (0.26 in). They have a convex, dull, glabrous, black body. The anterior tibiae are brown, while rest are black. The tarsi are light brown.

== Etymology ==
The species is named in honour of Attelabidae specialist Radek Dunda.
