= Eulasia =

Scientific classification
- Kingdom: Animalia
- Phylum: Arthropoda
- Clade: Pancrustacea
- Class: Insecta
- Order: Coleoptera
- Suborder: Polyphaga
- Infraorder: Scarabaeiformia
- Family: Glaphyridae
- Genus: Eulasia; Truqui, 1848

Type species
- Scarabaeus arctos Pallas, 1781

Genus of beetles

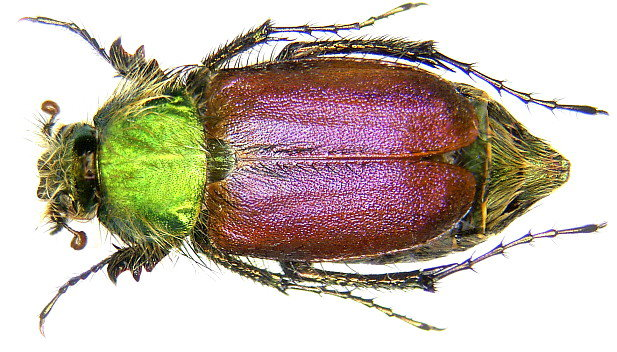
Eulasia papaveris

Eulasia is a genus of bumble bee scarab beetles.

== Description ==
Beetles of the Eulasia genus possess hairs on their tarsi and elytra. The outer margin of their mandibles is always rounded with a trifid apex. The integument of the pronotum is smooth and somewhat shiny.

== Taxonomy ==
Eulasia contains the following species:

- Eulasia bicolor
- Eulasia pretiosa
- Eulasia pietschmanni
- Eulasia daccordii
- Eulasia dilutipennis
- Eulasia straussi
- Eulasia saccai
- Eulasia korbi
- Eulasia analis
- Eulasia papaveris
- Eulasia pareyssei
- Eulasia corniculata
- Eulasia chrysopyga
- Eulasia cornifrons
- Eulasia jordanica
- Eulasia diadema
- Eulasia hyrax
- Eulasia hybrida
- Eulasia kuschakevitschi
- Eulasia nitidicollis
- Eulasia fastuosa
- Eulasia ozdikmeni
- Eulasia aurantiaca
- Eulasia goudoti
- Eulasia rapillyi
- Eulasia bombyliformis
- Eulasia arctos
- Eulasia bombylius
- Eulasia genei
- Eulasia vittata
