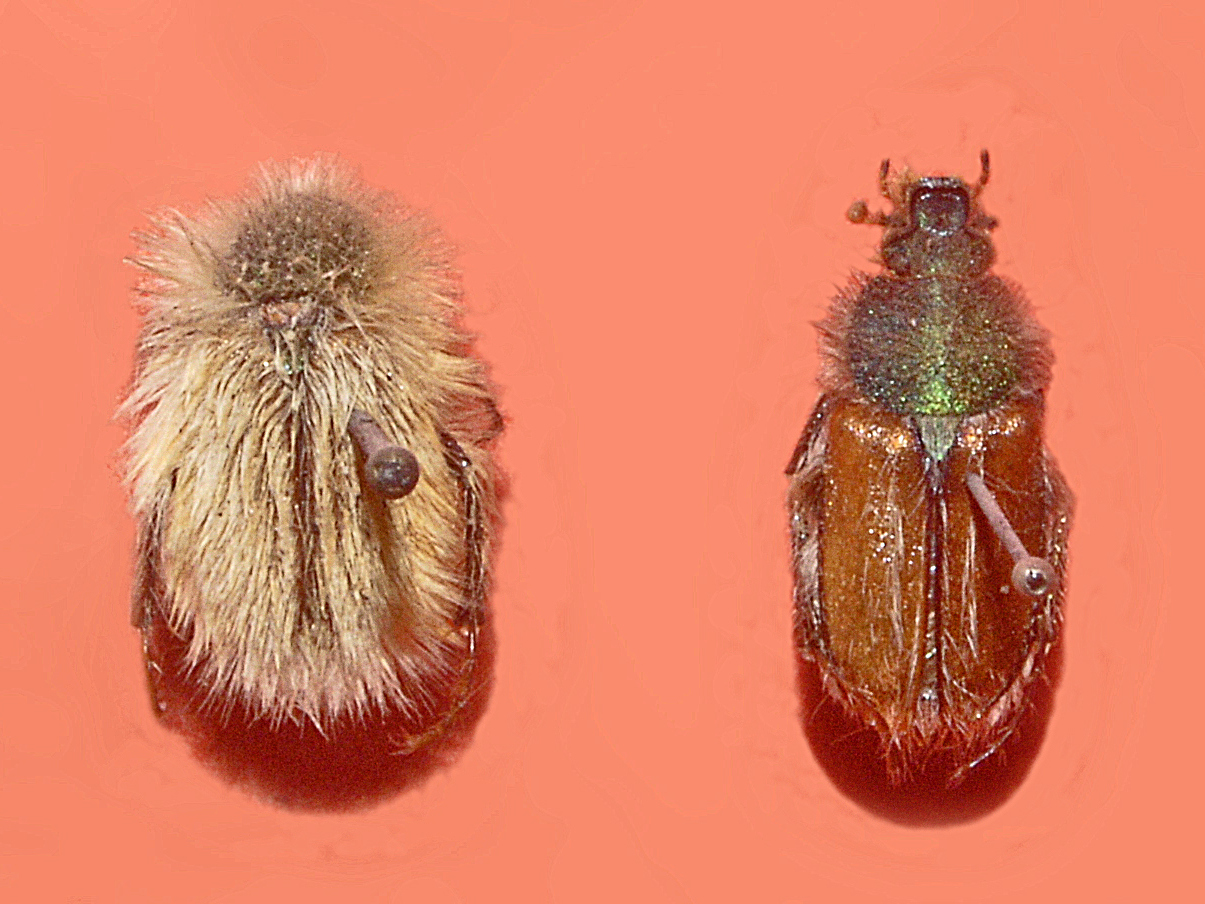
- Pygopleurus vulpes, male and female

Scientific classification
- Kingdom: Animalia
- Phylum: Arthropoda
- Class: Insecta
- Order: Coleoptera
- Suborder: Polyphaga
- Infraorder: Scarabaeiformia
- Family: Glaphyridae
- Subfamily: Amphicominae
- Genus: Pygopleurus; Motschulsky, 1860

= Pygopleurus =

Genus of beetles

Pygopleurus is a genus of beetles from the Glaphyridae family.

== Species ==
Species within this genus include:

- Pygopleurus akbesianus
- Pygopleurus aleppensis
- Pygopleurus anahitae
- Pygopleurus anemonius
- Pygopleurus angulatus
- Pygopleurus apicalis
- Pygopleurus banghaasi
- Pygopleurus basalis
- Pygopleurus besucheti
- Pygopleurus bimaculatus
- Pygopleurus caesareae
- Pygopleurus cirrius
- Pygopleurus costatus
- Pygopleurus cyaneoviolaceus
- Pygopleurus cyanescens
- Pygopleurus demelti
- Pygopleurus despectus
- Pygopleurus deuvei
- Pygopleurus diffusus
- Pygopleurus distinctus
- Pygopleurus distinguenda
- Pygopleurus foina
- Pygopleurus gordyenensis
- Pygopleurus hirsutus
- Pygopleurus humeralis
- Pygopleurus immundus
- Pygopleurus israelitus
- Pygopleurus kareli
- Pygopleurus katbehi
- Pygopleurus keithi
- Pygopleurus koniae
- Pygopleurus labaumei
- Pygopleurus libanonensis
- Pygopleurus lucarellii
- Pygopleurus lyciensis
- Pygopleurus madenensis
- Pygopleurus mardiensis
- Pygopleurus medius
- Pygopleurus mithridates
- Pygopleurus monticola
- Pygopleurus orientalis
- Pygopleurus ottomanus
- Pygopleurus ponticus
- Pygopleurus pseudomedius
- Pygopleurus psilotrichius
- Pygopleurus rapuzzii
- Pygopleurus ressli
- Pygopleurus rufovillosus
- Pygopleurus samai
- Pygopleurus scutellatus
- Pygopleurus sexualis
- Pygopleurus simplex
- Pygopleurus sinaicus
- Pygopleurus syriacus
- Pygopleurus transcaucasicus
- Pygopleurus tristis
- Pygopleurus weilli
- Pygopleurus vulpes
- Pygopleurus zagrosensis
