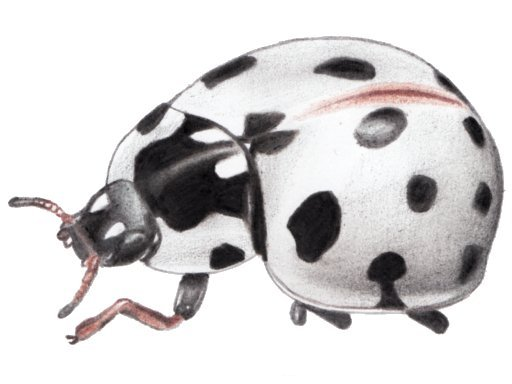
- Drawing

Conservation status
- Secure (NatureServe)

Scientific classification
- Kingdom: Animalia
- Phylum: Arthropoda
- Clade: Pancrustacea
- Class: Insecta
- Order: Coleoptera
- Suborder: Polyphaga
- Infraorder: Cucujiformia
- Family: Coccinellidae
- Genus: Anatis
- Species: A. labiculata

Binomial name
- Anatis labiculata (Say, 1824)

Synonyms
- Coccinella labiculata Say, 1824; Coccinella quindecimpunctata Olivier, 1808; Anatis canadensis Provancher, 1877; Anatis caseyi Westcott, 1912

= Anatis labiculata =

Species of beetle

Anatis labiculata, known generally as the fifteen-spotted lady beetle or fifteen-spotted ladybird beetle, is a species of lady beetle in the family Coccinellidae. It is found in North America, where it has been recorded from Ontario to South Carolina, west to North Dakota, Colorado and Texas.

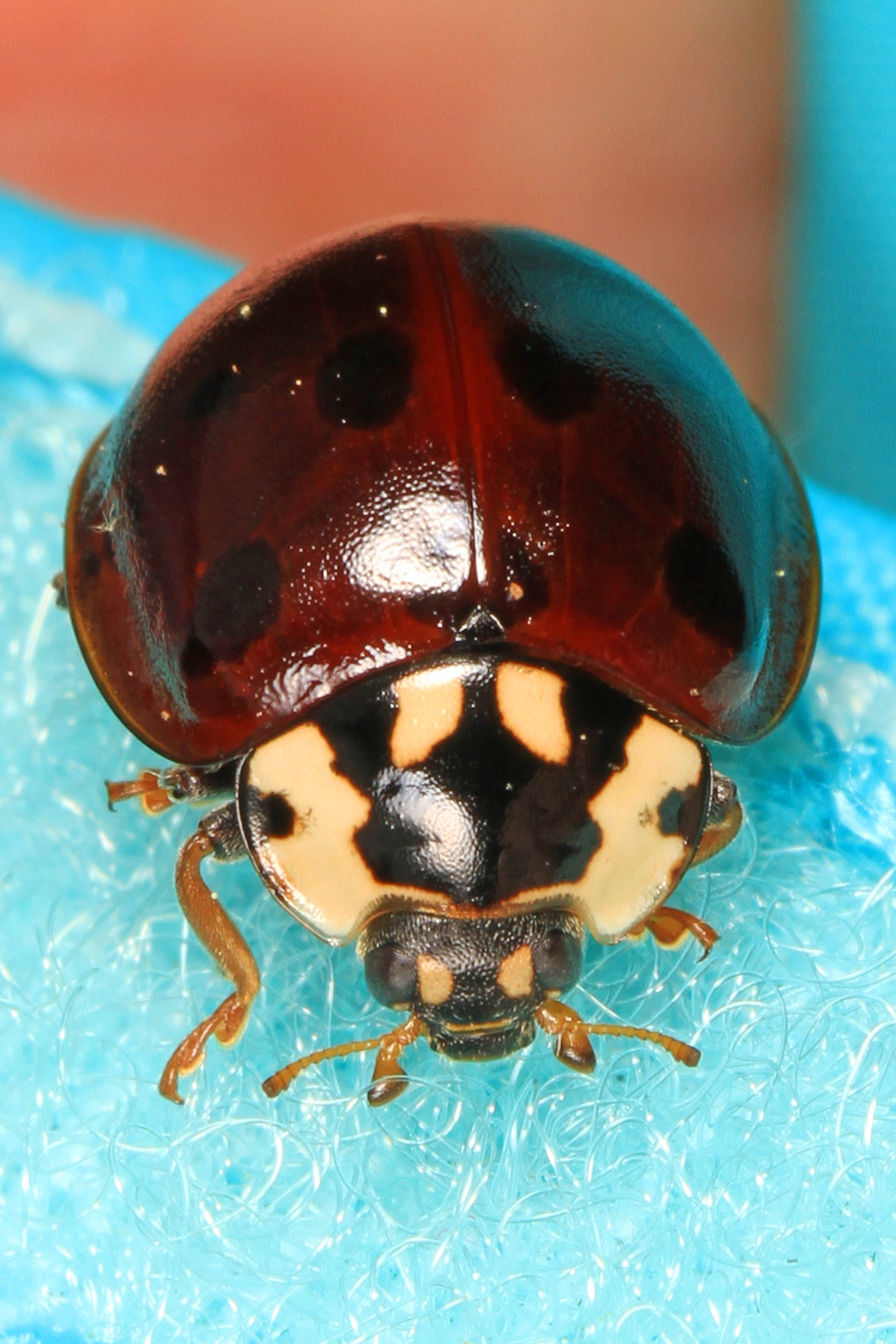
Fifteen-spotted lady beetle, Anatis labiculata

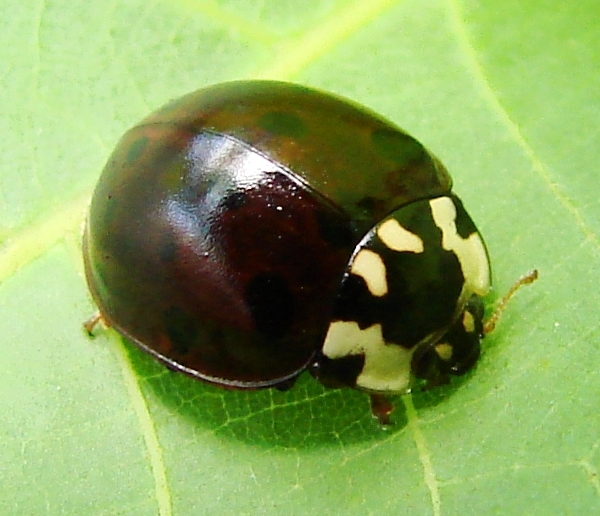
Fifteen-spotted lady beetle, Anatis labiculata

== Description ==
Adults reach a length of about 7.2–9.5 mm (0.28–0.37 in). Adults are yellow to brownish red with black markings.
