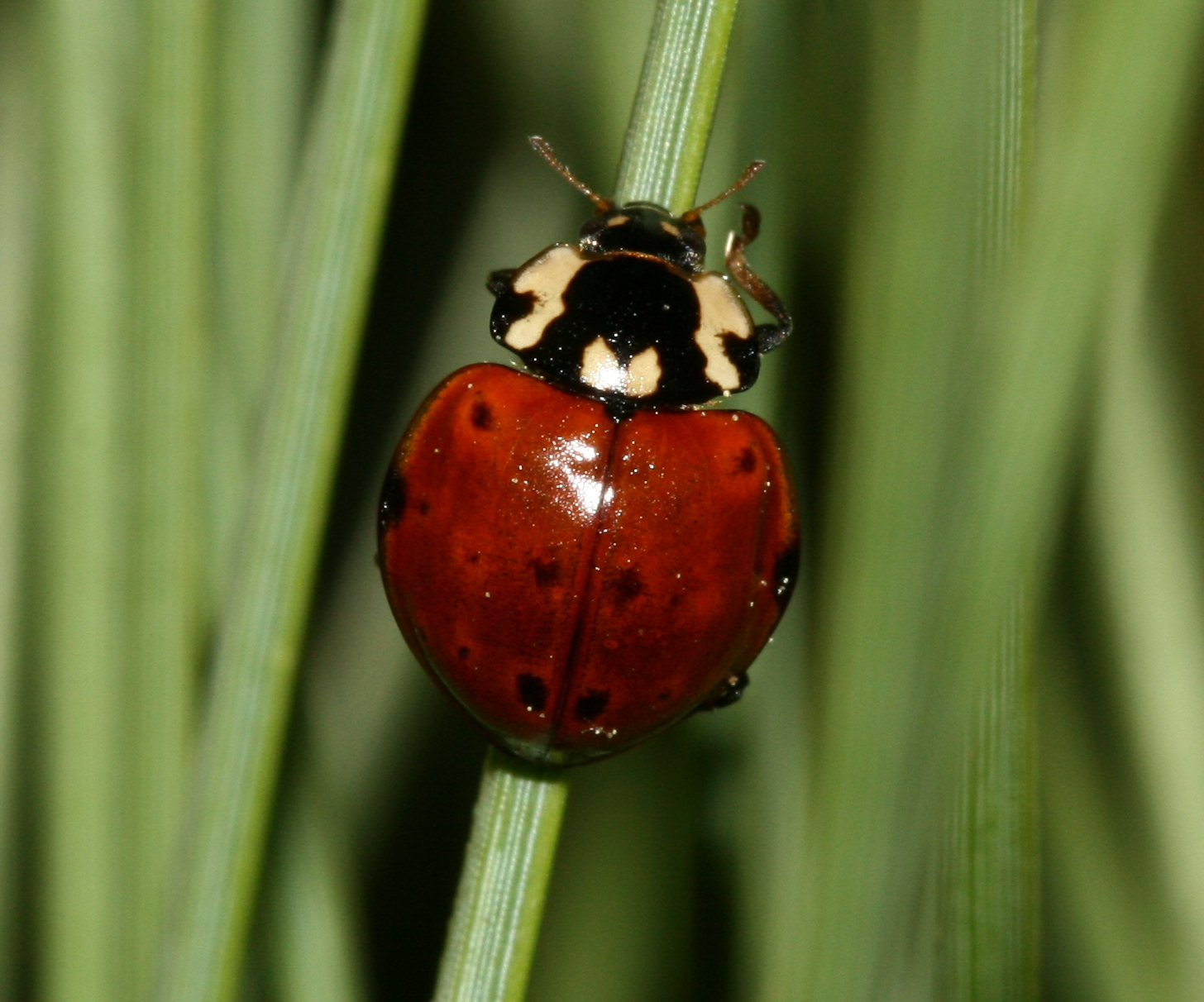

Scientific classification
- Kingdom: Animalia
- Phylum: Arthropoda
- Clade: Pancrustacea
- Class: Insecta
- Order: Coleoptera
- Suborder: Polyphaga
- Infraorder: Cucujiformia
- Family: Coccinellidae
- Genus: Anatis
- Species: A. rathvoni

Binomial name
- Anatis rathvoni (LeConte, 1852)

Synonyms
- Myzia rathvoni LeConte, 1852

= Anatis rathvoni =

Species of beetle

Anatis rathvoni, commonly known as the Rathvon lady beetle or the flying saucer ladybug, is a species of ladybug in the family Coccinellidae. It is found in North America, where it has been recorded from southern Alberta to British Columbia and south to northern California.

== Description ==
Adults reach a length of about 7.5-10.2 mm. Adults are yellow to brownish red with black markings.

== Etymology ==
The species is named for Simon Rathvon, a 19th-century American entomologist.
