= Carinaulus inexpectatus =

Scientific classification
- Kingdom: Animalia
- Phylum: Arthropoda
- Clade: Pancrustacea
- Class: Insecta
- Order: Coleoptera
- Suborder: Polyphaga
- Infraorder: Scarabaeiformia
- Family: Scarabaeidae
- Genus: Carinaulus
- Species: C. inexpectatus

Binomial name
- Carinaulus inexpectatus (Balthasar, 1935)

Synonyms
- Aphodius (Agrilinus) inexpectatus Balthasar, 1935; Carinaulus inexspectatus; Aphodius (Carinaulus) coreensis Kim, 1986; Aphodius (Carinaulus) nigrocarinatus Nikolajev, 1979

Species of beetle

Carinaulus inexpectatus is a species of beetle of the family Scarabaeidae. It is found in North Korea, South Korea and the Russian Far East. Records from Japan and Siberia are probably erroneous and records from Kazakhstan need verification.

== Description ==
Adults reach a length of about 5.1–6.7 mm (0.20–0.26 in). They have an elongate-oval, shiny, reddish-brown to brown body, with the antenna lamellate colour yellowish.

== Life history ==
Specimens have been collected from cow dung.
