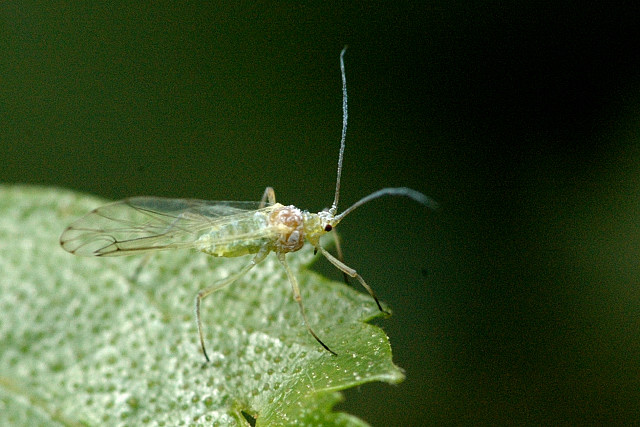

Scientific classification
- Kingdom: Animalia
- Phylum: Arthropoda
- Class: Insecta
- Order: Hemiptera
- Suborder: Sternorrhyncha
- Family: Aphididae
- Genus: Euceraphis
- Species: E. punctipennis

Binomial name
- Euceraphis punctipennis (Zetterstedt 1828)

= Euceraphis punctipennis =

Species of true bug

Euceraphis punctipennis, the downy birch aphid or European birch aphid, is a species of aphid in the order Hemiptera. These aphids are tiny green insects with soft bodies and membranous wings. They are found living on downy birch trees (Betula pubescens) where they feed and multiply on the buds and leaves by sucking sap.

== Description ==
The downy birch aphid has a pale green body, lightly dusted with bluish wax particles, membranous wings and long legs. During the spring and summer all adults are females and give birth to live young by parthenogenesis. This aphid is very similar in appearance to its close relative the silver birch aphid (Euceraphis betulae) which lives and feeds exclusively on silver birch trees Betula pendula. At one time they were thought to be the same species but chromosomal differences between the two have been found and they are now considered to be separate species.

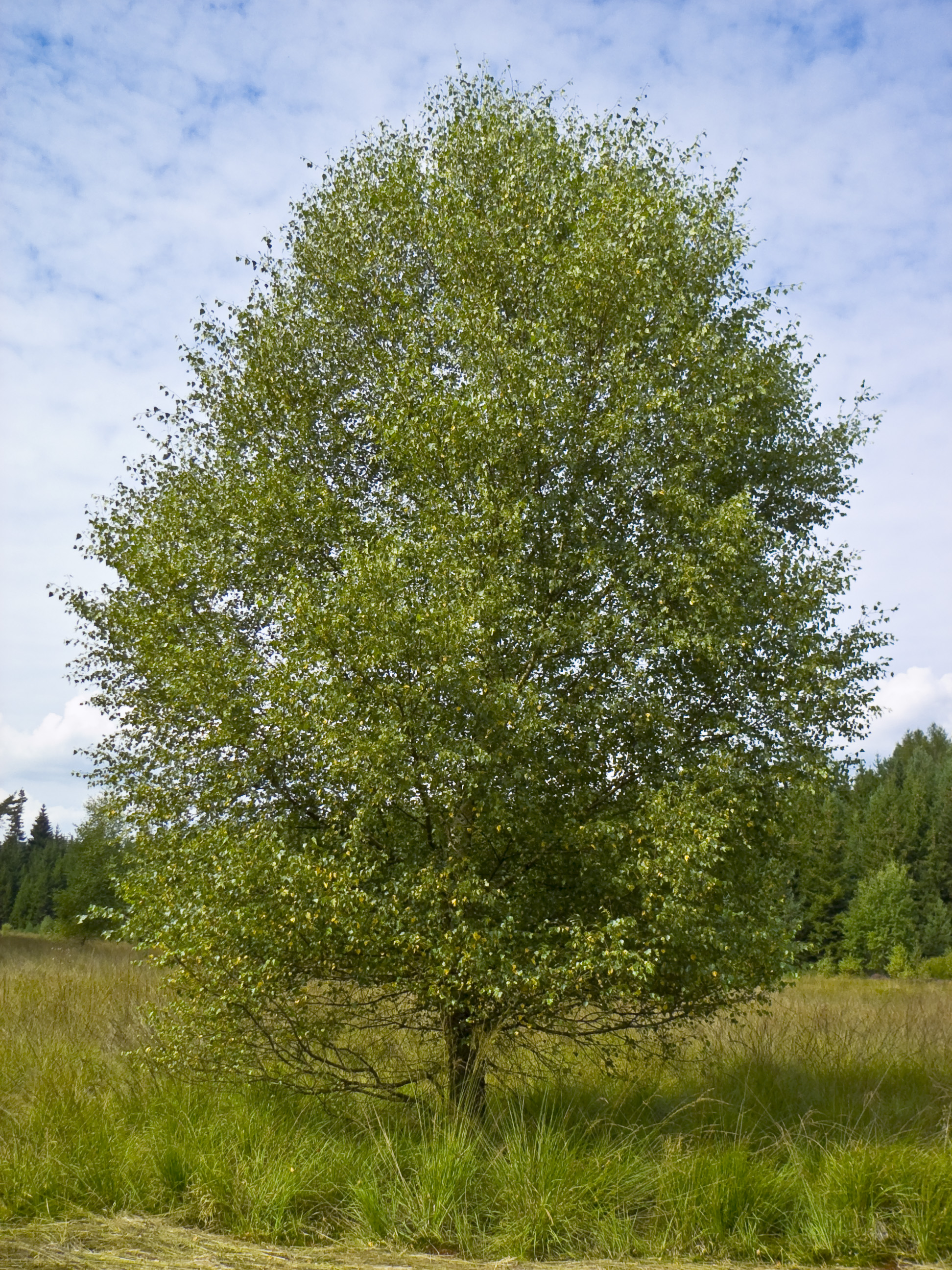
Downy birch in summer

== Distribution ==
This aphid is found in Europe wherever its host trees grow. Downy birch trees have been introduced into North America and the aphids have accompanied them there, arriving in about 1847.

== Biology ==
The downy birch aphid feeds on sap and exudes copious amounts of honeydew which coats the leaves on which it feeds. This provides food for flies and other small animals. The aphids are preyed on by ladybirds and are parasitized by certain species of wasp which lay their eggs in young nymphs.

It has been found that the proportion of adults and nymphs in the population varies during the summer with there being the largest number of nymphal forms in June and late August and few nymphs in July. This correlates with the nutritional quality of the tree's sap. This is high in the early season spurt of growth, falls in the middle of the summer and rises again in late summer with senescence setting in. At this time the tree is transferring organic products out of the leaves (which will soon be shed) to the trunk and roots for storage. This richer saps seem to stimulate the aphids to resume reproductive activity.
