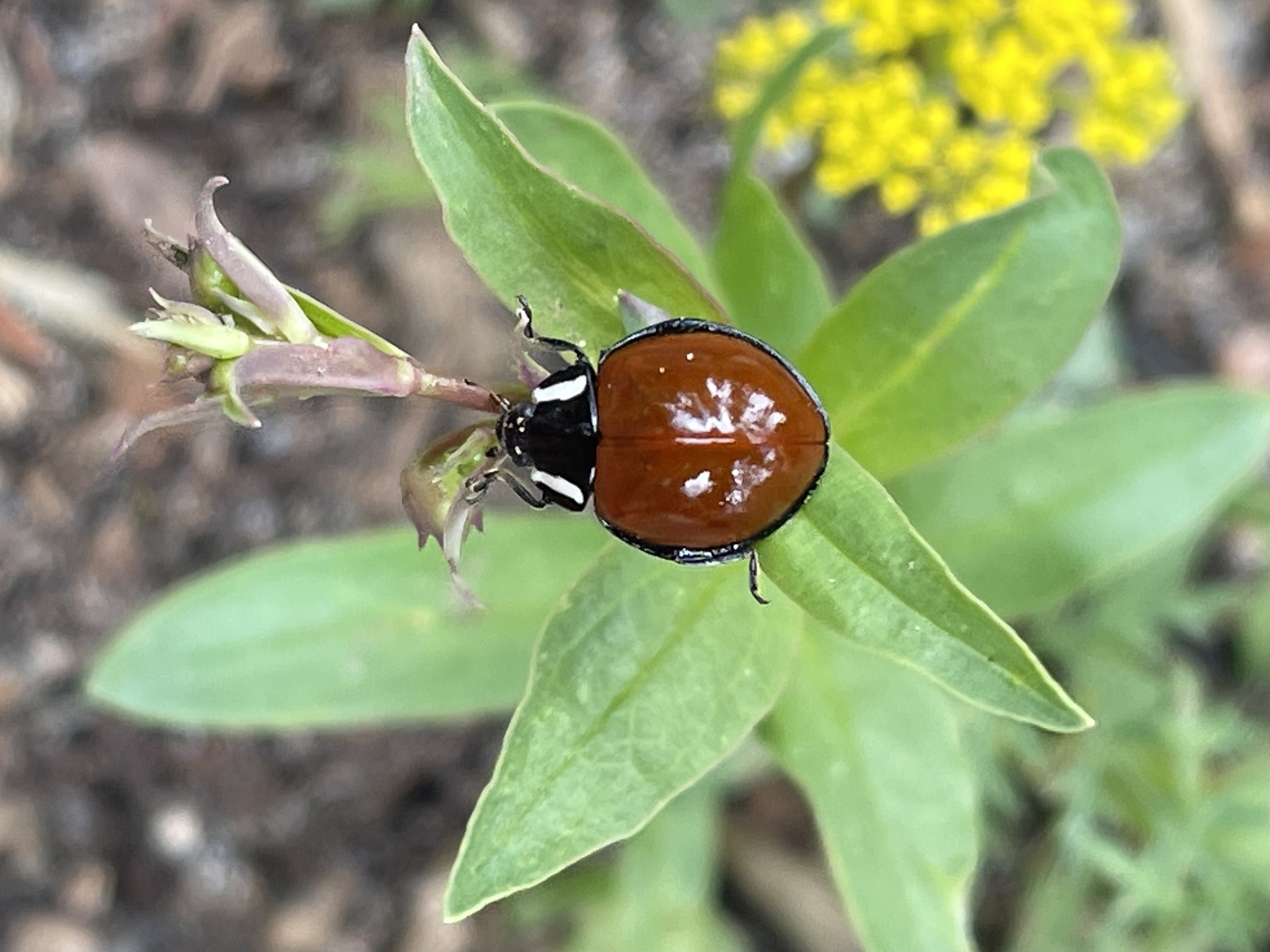
- Anatis lecontei.jpg

Scientific classification
- Kingdom: Animalia
- Phylum: Arthropoda
- Clade: Pancrustacea
- Class: Insecta
- Order: Coleoptera
- Suborder: Polyphaga
- Infraorder: Cucujiformia
- Family: Coccinellidae
- Genus: Anatis
- Species: A. lecontei

Binomial name
- Anatis lecontei Casey, 1899

= Anatis lecontei =

Species of beetle

Anatis lecontei, or Leconte's giant lady beetle, is a species of lady beetle in the family Coccinellidae. It is found in North America, where it has been recorded from southern Alberta to New Mexico, west to British Columbia and California.

== Description ==
Adults reach a length of about 7.75-10.5 mm. Adults are yellow to brownish red. The pronotum often has two basal spots.
