= Carinaulus wrzecionkoi =

Scientific classification
- Kingdom: Animalia
- Phylum: Arthropoda
- Clade: Pancrustacea
- Class: Insecta
- Order: Coleoptera
- Suborder: Polyphaga
- Infraorder: Scarabaeiformia
- Family: Scarabaeidae
- Genus: Carinaulus
- Species: C. wrzecionkoi

Binomial name
- Carinaulus wrzecionkoi (Červenka, 2000)

Synonyms
- Aphodius (Carinaulus) wrzecionkoi Červenka, 2000

Species of beetle

Carinaulus wrzecionkoi is a species of beetle of the family Scarabaeidae. It is found in China (Xizang).

== Description ==
Adults reach a length of about 6.9 mm (0.27 in). They have an ovate, convex, dull, grey-black body. There are fine setae on the elytral intervals and the legs are black.

== Etymology ==
The species is named in honour of Carabidae specialist Antonín Wrzecionko.
