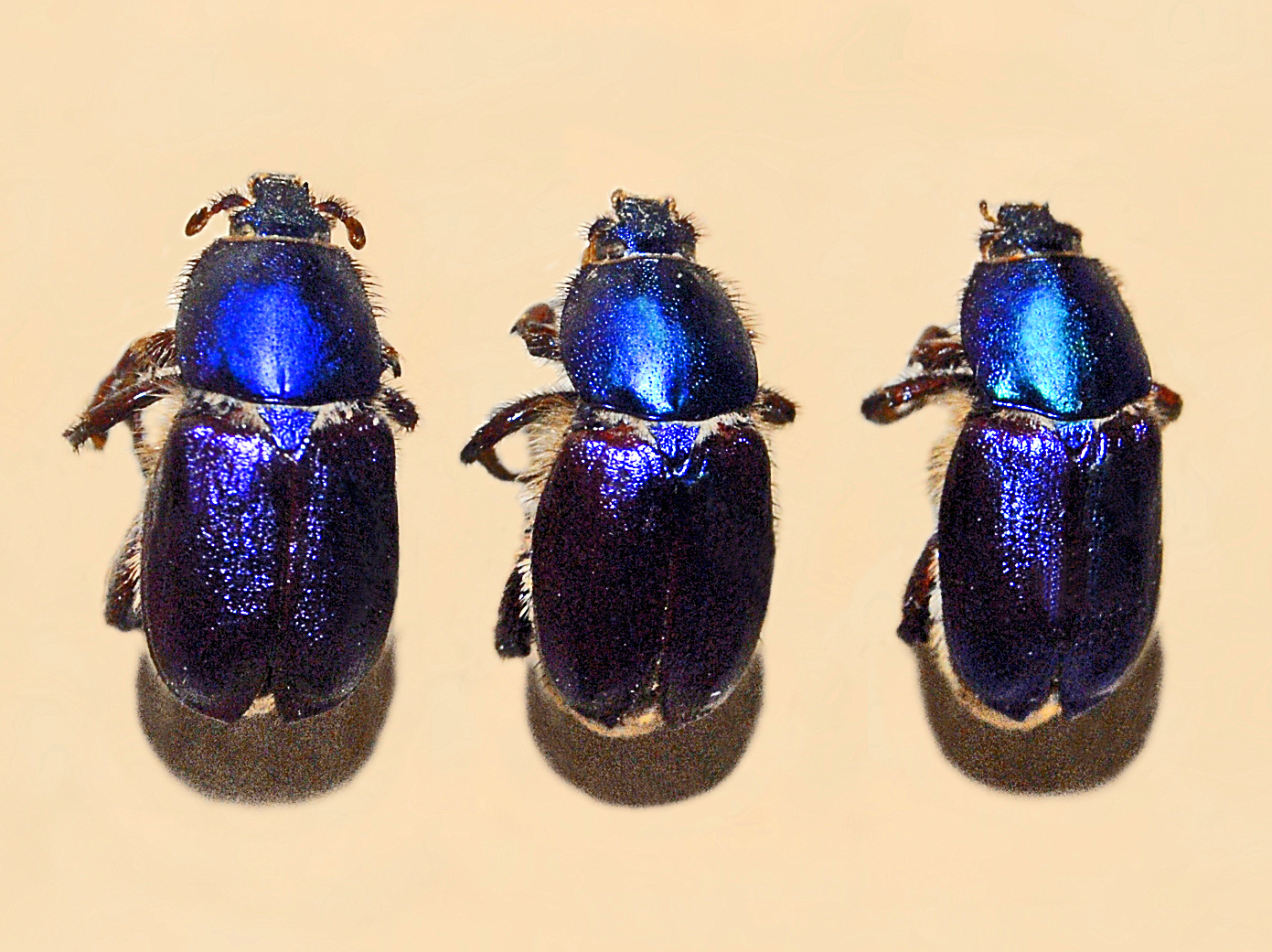
- Glaphyrus maurus from Tunisia

Scientific classification
- Kingdom: Animalia
- Phylum: Arthropoda
- Clade: Pancrustacea
- Class: Insecta
- Order: Coleoptera
- Suborder: Polyphaga
- Infraorder: Scarabaeiformia
- Family: Glaphyridae
- Genus: Glaphyrus
- Species: G. maurus

Binomial name
- Glaphyrus maurus (Linnaeus, 1758)

Synonyms
- Scarabaeus maurus Linnaeus, 1758; Melolontha cardeci Fabricius, 1787

= Glaphyrus maurus =

Species of beetle

Glaphyrus maurus is a species of beetles belonging to the family Glaphyridae.

== Description ==
Glaphyrus maurus has a blue-green body, a convex thorax, glabrous elytra and a yellowish hairy abdomen.

== Distribution ==
This species is present in North Africa (Algeria, Morocco, Mauritania, Tunisia).
