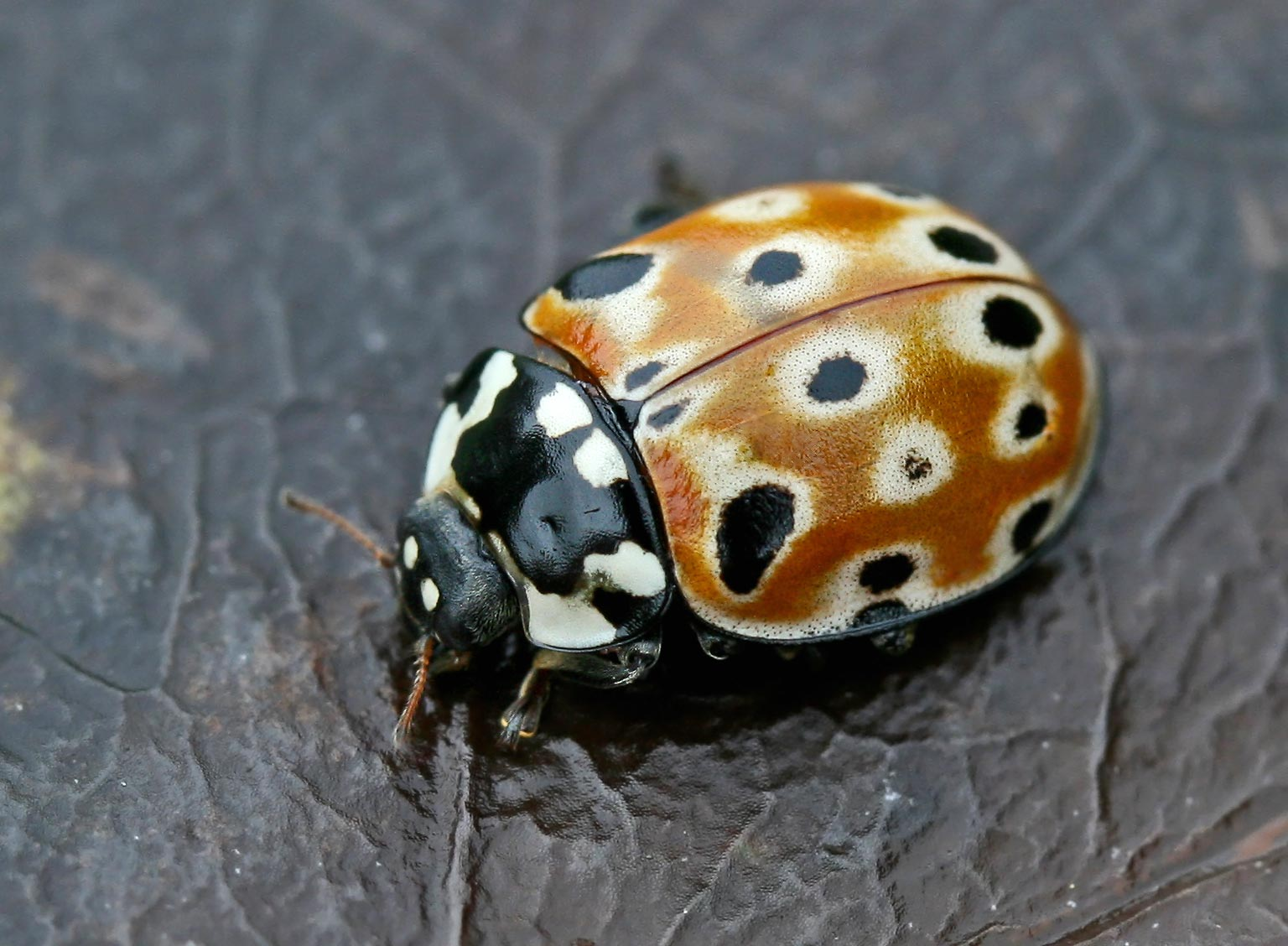

Scientific classification
- Kingdom: Animalia
- Phylum: Arthropoda
- Clade: Pancrustacea
- Class: Insecta
- Order: Coleoptera
- Suborder: Polyphaga
- Infraorder: Cucujiformia
- Family: Coccinellidae
- Genus: Anatis
- Species: A. ocellata

Binomial name
- Anatis ocellata (Linnaeus, 1758)

Synonyms
- Coccinella ocellata Linnaeus, 1758; Coccinella hebraea Linnaeus, 1758; Coccinella ocellata Pallas, 1773; Coccinella quindecimpunctata De Geer, 1775; Coccinella sexlineata Fabricius, 1781; Coccinella oblongopunctata Fabricius, 1787; Coccinella moscovica Gmelin, 1790; Coccinella boeberi Cederhjelm, 1798; Anatis mobilis Mulsant, 1850

= Anatis ocellata =

Species of beetle

Anatis ocellata, commonly known as the eyed ladybug, is a species of ladybug in the family Coccinellidae. It has black spots on a red background, though a brown background has been seen in Alberta, with each spot surrounded by a yellowish halo. In one color variation, a specimen found in Scotland was reported having the spots fused to form longitudinal lines. Sometimes can also be found variation where black spots are absent.

== Distribution ==
The species is found from continental Europe, in transcontinental Russia, in central Asia, in Mongolia, in northern China, in Western Canada and to the Korean Peninsula and also Turkey.

== Biology ==
The primary habitat is temperate coniferous forest including Central European mixed forests and Sarmatic mixed forests, Scandinavian montane birch forest. Most frequently on pines but also on Picea abies and other Picea species, Betula pendula and other Betula species, and Populus tremula. Adults are entomophagous, mainly feeding on aphids on coniferous trees

The species feeds on aphids such as Eucallipterus tiliae, Tuberculatus annulatus, Euceraphis betulae, Cavariella konoi, Acyrthosiphon ignotum, A. pisum, and Macrosiphoniella artemisiae. They prefer pine aphids (family Adelgidae), and are attracted to the scent of pine. The defensive alkaloid compound 2-dehydrococcinelline has been isolated and identified from this species. The adults and larvae also feed on leaf hopper larvae on P. tremula. The adults overwinter.
