= Pygopleurus hirsutus =

Scientific classification
- Kingdom: Animalia
- Phylum: Arthropoda
- Class: Insecta
- Order: Coleoptera
- Suborder: Polyphaga
- Infraorder: Scarabaeiformia
- Family: Glaphyridae
- Genus: Pygopleurus
- Species: P. hirsutus

Binomial name
- Pygopleurus hirsutus (Brullé, 1832)

Species of beetle

Pygopleurus hirsutus is a species of beetle from the Glaphyridae family. The scientific name of this species was first published in 1832 by Brullé.
