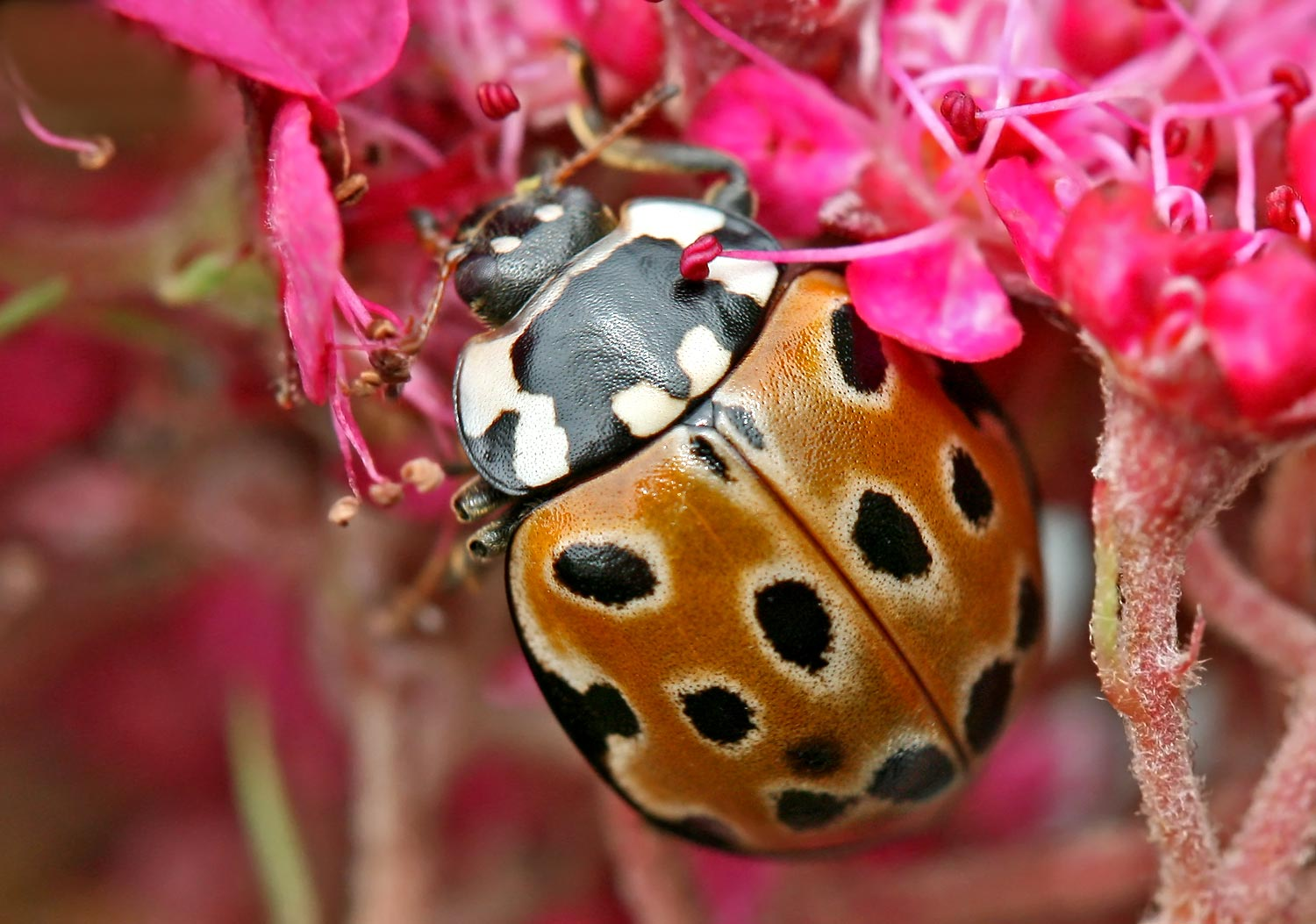
- Anatis ocellata

Scientific classification
- Kingdom: Animalia
- Phylum: Arthropoda
- Clade: Pancrustacea
- Class: Insecta
- Order: Coleoptera
- Suborder: Polyphaga
- Infraorder: Cucujiformia
- Family: Coccinellidae
- Tribe: Coccinellini
- Genus: Anatis; Mulsant, 1846

Synonyms
- Pelina Mulsant, 1850 (preocc.); Pelina (Palla) Mulsant, 1850 (preocc.); Neopalla Chapin, 1955

= Anatis =

Genus of beetles

Anatis is a genus of ladybird beetles containing the following species: This genus is also referred to as "giant lady beetles."

== Species ==
- Anatis borrei (Crotch, 1874)
- Anatis geometrica (Weise, 1901)
- Anatis halonis Lewis, 1896
- Anatis hydropica (Mulsant, 1850)
- Anatis labiculata (Say, 1824)
- Anatis lebasii (Mulsant, 1850)
- Anatis lecontei Casey, 1899
- Anatis mali (Say, 1824)
- Anatis ocellata (Linnaeus, 1758)
- Anatis rathvoni (LeConte, 1852)

== Fossil species ==
- †Anatis gortanii Fiori, 1932
- †Anatis resurgens Wickham, 1917
