= Carinaulus sikkimensis =

Scientific classification
- Kingdom: Animalia
- Phylum: Arthropoda
- Clade: Pancrustacea
- Class: Insecta
- Order: Coleoptera
- Suborder: Polyphaga
- Infraorder: Scarabaeiformia
- Family: Scarabaeidae
- Genus: Carinaulus
- Species: C. sikkimensis

Binomial name
- Carinaulus sikkimensis (Balthasar, 1965)

Synonyms
- Aphodius (Oxyaphodius) sikkimensis Balthasar, 1965

Species of beetle

Carinaulus sikkimensis is a species of beetle of the family Scarabaeidae. It is found in Bhutan, India (Sikkim) and Nepal.

== Description ==
Adults reach a length of about 5.5–6.5 mm (0.22–0.26 in). They have an oval-elongate, moderately convex, nearly dull body (with only the sides of the pronotum and elytral interstices shortly pubescent). They are blackish, with the antennal club piceous and the legs dark brown-blackish.
