= Carinaulus vseteckai =

Scientific classification
- Kingdom: Animalia
- Phylum: Arthropoda
- Clade: Pancrustacea
- Class: Insecta
- Order: Coleoptera
- Suborder: Polyphaga
- Infraorder: Scarabaeiformia
- Family: Scarabaeidae
- Genus: Carinaulus
- Species: C. vseteckai

Binomial name
- Carinaulus vseteckai (Tesař, 1945)

Synonyms
- Aphodius (Carinaulus) vseteckai Tesař, 1945

Species of beetle

Carinaulus vseteckai is a species of beetle of the family Scarabaeidae. It is found in China (Sichuan, Yunnan).

== Description ==
Adults reach a length of about 4.4–5.7 mm (0.17–0.22 in). They have an oblong-oval, convex body. The elytra are brown with yellowish setae, the pronotum is dark brown, and the clypeus and the sides of the pronotum are lighter, reddish brown. The legs are light brown.
