= Carinaulus zhanglaensis =

Scientific classification
- Kingdom: Animalia
- Phylum: Arthropoda
- Clade: Pancrustacea
- Class: Insecta
- Order: Coleoptera
- Suborder: Polyphaga
- Infraorder: Scarabaeiformia
- Family: Scarabaeidae
- Genus: Carinaulus
- Species: C. zhanglaensis

Binomial name
- Carinaulus zhanglaensis (Červenka, 2000)

Synonyms
- Aphodius (Carinaulus) zhanglaensis Červenka, 2000

Species of beetle

Carinaulus zhanglaensis is a species of beetle of the family Scarabaeidae. It is found in China (Sichuan).

== Description ==
Adults reach a length of about 5.6–6.5 mm (0.22–0.26 in). They have a convex, subparallel body, with the head and pronotum black, and the clypeus with a red-brown border. The sides of the pronotum and the elytra are red-brown. The legs are brown.

== Etymology ==
The species is named after the Zhangla village in China.
