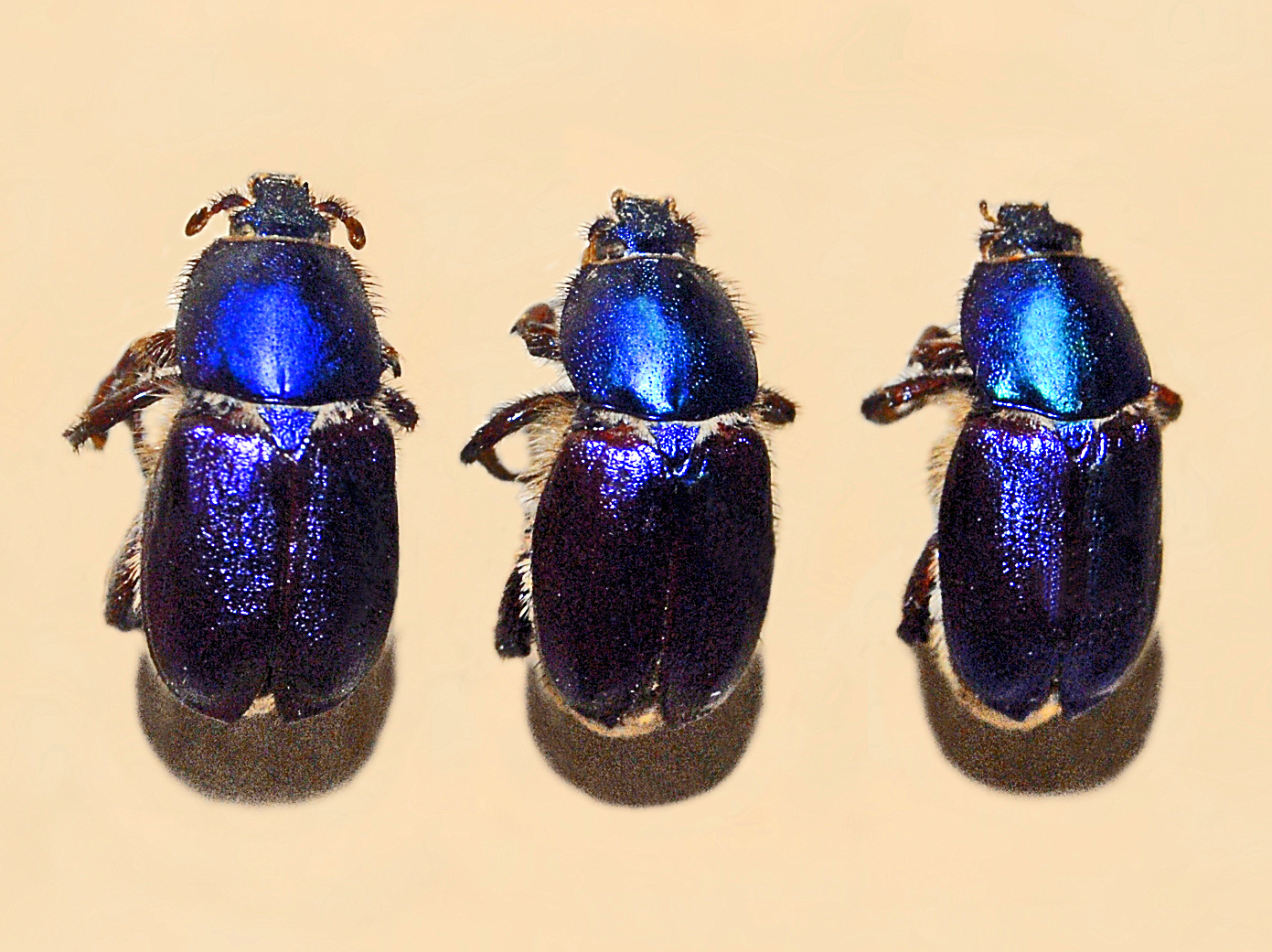
- Glaphyrus maurus

Scientific classification
- Kingdom: Animalia
- Phylum: Arthropoda
- Class: Insecta
- Order: Coleoptera
- Suborder: Polyphaga
- Infraorder: Scarabaeiformia
- Family: Glaphyridae
- Genus: Glaphyrus; Latreille, 1807

= Glaphyrus =

Genus of beetles

Glaphyrus is a genus of beetles belonging to the family Glaphyridae.

== Species ==
- Glaphyrus aulicus
- Glaphyrus calvaster
- Glaphyrus caucasicus
- Glaphyrus cinnaberinus
- Glaphyrus comosus
- Glaphyrus festivus
- Glaphyrus haroldi
- Glaphyrus laufferi
- Glaphyrus luristanus
- Glaphyrus maurus
- Glaphyrus micans
- Glaphyrus modestus
- Glaphyrus muticus
- Glaphyrus olivieri
- Glaphyrus onopordi
- Glaphyrus opulentus
- Glaphyrus orbachi
- Glaphyrus ornatus
- Glaphyrus oxypterus
- Glaphyrus panousei
- Glaphyrus pubescens
- Glaphyrus reymondi
- Glaphyrus rothi
- Glaphyrus serratulae
- Glaphyrus superbus
- Glaphyrus turkestanicus
- Glaphyrus varians
- Glaphyrus viridicollis
