= Carinaulus armandidavidi =

Scientific classification
- Kingdom: Animalia
- Phylum: Arthropoda
- Clade: Pancrustacea
- Class: Insecta
- Order: Coleoptera
- Suborder: Polyphaga
- Infraorder: Scarabaeiformia
- Family: Scarabaeidae
- Genus: Carinaulus
- Species: C. armandidavidi

Binomial name
- Carinaulus armandidavidi (Červenka, 2000)

Synonyms
- Aphodius (Carinaulus) armandidavidi Červenka, 2000

Species of beetle

Carinaulus armandidavidi is a species of beetle of the family Scarabaeidae. It is found in China (Sichuan).

== Description ==
Adults reach a length of about 6.5 mm (0.26 in). They have a convex, black, dull body (although the clypeus is feebly glossy near the anterior and lateral margins). The head and pronotum are glabrous, and each elytral interval has two rows of distinct setae. The legs are black-brown.

== Etymology ==
The species is named in honour of Mr. Armand David.
