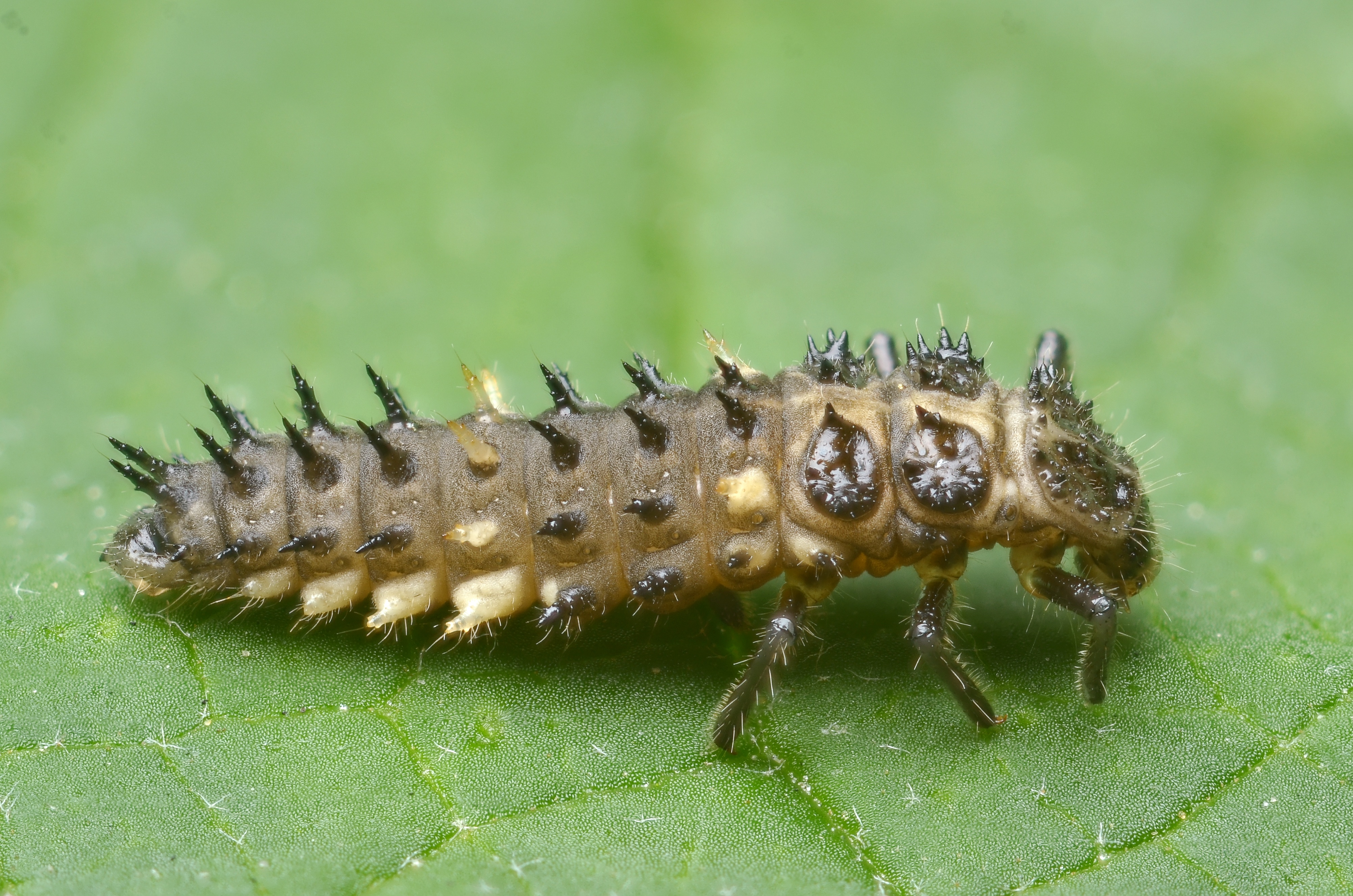
- Larva

Scientific classification
- Kingdom: Animalia
- Phylum: Arthropoda
- Clade: Pancrustacea
- Class: Insecta
- Order: Coleoptera
- Suborder: Polyphaga
- Infraorder: Cucujiformia
- Family: Coccinellidae
- Genus: Calvia
- Species: C. quatuordecimguttata

Binomial name
- Calvia quatuordecimguttata (Linnaeus, 1758)

Synonyms
- List: Coccinella quindecimguttata Fabricius, 1777; Coccinella albomarginata Goeze, 1777; Coccinella bisseptemguttata Schaller, 1783; Coccinella marginata Geoffroy in Fourcroy, 1785; Coccinella duodecimgemmata Herbst, 1793; Coccinella bisseptempunctata Percheron, 1835; Vibidia murasei Ohta, 1929

= Calvia quatuordecimguttata =

- Adult insect

Species of beetle

Calvia quatuordecimguttata, the cream-spot ladybird, is a species of ladybird in the family Coccinellidae. Its distribution is holarctic, it being found in North America, Europe and through the East Palearctic to Japan. This ladybird is generally 4 to 5 millimetres (0.16 to 0.20 in) in length, and varies in appearance depending on the geographical location. It usually lives in hedgerows and deciduous trees.

== Taxonomy ==
This ladybird was first described by Carl Linnaeus in his 1758 10th edition of Systema Naturae as Coccinella 14-guttata. As ladybirds were further studied, it was transferred to the genus Calvia which was erected in 1873 by the French entomologist Étienne Mulsant. The specific name comes from quatuordecim, the Latin for "fourteen" and guttata, the Latin for "spotted".

This ladybird is also sometimes known as the cream-spotted ladybird, polkadot ladybird or eighteen spot ladybird, and may be confused with another beetle also known as the eighteen-spot ladybird (Myrrha octodecimguttata). The latter is usually found on pine trees, is smaller and a paler brown colour, and has a characteristic M-shaped white mark on its pronotum.

== Distribution ==
The cream-spot ladybird has a holarctic distribution. In North America the range extends from Alaska and Labrador south to California and New Jersey, where it is introduced. The Palearctic range is Europe, North Africa, Cyprus, European Russia, the Caucasus, Siberia, the Russian Far East, Belarus, Ukraine, Moldova, Transcaucasia, Kazakhstan, western Asia, Pakistan, Mongolia, China, and Japan. It is present throughout Britain and Ireland though more common in England than further west and north.

== Description ==
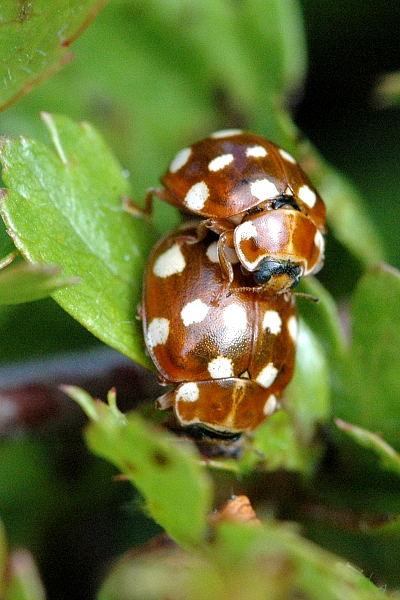
Mating

The cream-spot ladybird measures 4 to 5.5 millimetres (0.16 to 0.22 in) long and 3.2 to 4.5 millimetres (0.13 to 0.18 in) broad. It is very variable in colouration in North America. In Europe the species is consistently maroon-brown with fourteen cream-coloured spots, but in North America and parts of eastern temperate Asia it occurs in several other colour forms. It may be black with white spots (similar to the European form but darker), or anywhere from yellow to pink with 18 large blotches. An excessively melanistic version exists that is all black with a large red-orange patch on each elytron. It always has a glossy pronotum, and the underside of the beetle has a thin red rim to the otherwise black abdominal segments.

The larvae are black with white markings. They have six legs and several blunt conical spines on each segment of the abdomen, similar to larvae of Cycloneda but with shorter legs.

== Ecology ==
The species occurs in a wide variety of environments – deciduous and mixed forests such as Western European broadleaf forests, in ruderal areas, in parks, gardens, and meadows on grasses, bushes, and trees. It is also found in forest litter, on brushwood, in moss, in coarse woody debris and compost. It is entomophagous, feeding on aphids, Aleyrodidae, coccids, Coccoidea and on larvae and eggs of some beetles and butterflies.

In a study it was found that their preferred prey aphids included the aspen leaf aphid Chaitophorus tremulae, the angelica aphid Cavariella konoi, the small willow aphid Aphis farinosa, the lime-tree aphid Eucallipterus tiliae, the birch aphid Euceraphis betulae and the mugwort aphid Macrosiphoniella artemisiae. They overwinter in leaf litter, crevices in the bark of trees and other similar protective locations.
