= Carinaulus krali =

Scientific classification
- Kingdom: Animalia
- Phylum: Arthropoda
- Clade: Pancrustacea
- Class: Insecta
- Order: Coleoptera
- Suborder: Polyphaga
- Infraorder: Scarabaeiformia
- Family: Scarabaeidae
- Genus: Carinaulus
- Species: C. krali

Binomial name
- Carinaulus krali (Červenka, 2000)

Synonyms
- Aphodius (Carinaulus) krali Červenka, 2000

Species of beetle

Carinaulus krali is a species of beetle of the family Scarabaeidae. It is found in China (Yunnan).

== Description ==
Adults reach a length of about 5.4–6.3 mm (0.21–0.25 in). They have a elongate-oval, convex, dull, grey-black body. The elytra and pronotum have light hairs. The legs are brown-black to black and glossy.

== Etymology ==
The species is named in honour of Aphodiinae specialist David Král.
