= Carinaulus =

Scientific classification
- Kingdom: Animalia
- Phylum: Arthropoda
- Clade: Pancrustacea
- Class: Insecta
- Order: Coleoptera
- Suborder: Polyphaga
- Infraorder: Scarabaeiformia
- Family: Scarabaeidae
- Subfamily: Aphodiinae
- Tribe: Aphodiini
- Genus: Carinaulus; Tesař, 1945

Synonyms
- Aphodius (Carinaulus) Tesař, 1945; Aphodius (Oxyaphodius) Balthasar, 1965

Genus of beetles

Carinaulus is a genus of beetles of the family Scarabaeidae.

== Species ==
- Carinaulus armandidavidi (Červenka, 2000)
- Carinaulus dierli (Balthasar, 1967)
- Carinaulus dundarum (Červenka, 2000)
- Carinaulus gansuicus (Červenka, 2000)
- Carinaulus imitabilis (Červenka, 2000)
- Carinaulus inexpectatus (Balthasar, 1935)
- Carinaulus jakli (Červenka, 2000)
- Carinaulus krali (Červenka, 2000)
- Carinaulus kucerai Král, Mencl & Rakovič, 2021
- Carinaulus meghalayensis (Červenka, 2000)
- Carinaulus milaninikodymi (Červenka, 2000)
- Carinaulus pseudovseteckai (Červenka, 2003)
- Carinaulus pseudozhanglaensis (Červenka, 2003)
- Carinaulus pucholti (Balthasar, 1961)
- Carinaulus sikkimensis (Balthasar, 1965)
- Carinaulus tryznai (Červenka, 2000)
- Carinaulus vseteckai (Tesař, 1945)
- Carinaulus wrzecionkoi (Červenka, 2000)
- Carinaulus zhanglaensis (Červenka, 2000)
