= Carinaulus jakli =

Scientific classification
- Kingdom: Animalia
- Phylum: Arthropoda
- Clade: Pancrustacea
- Class: Insecta
- Order: Coleoptera
- Suborder: Polyphaga
- Infraorder: Scarabaeiformia
- Family: Scarabaeidae
- Genus: Carinaulus
- Species: C. jakli

Binomial name
- Carinaulus jakli (Červenka, 2000)

Synonyms
- Aphodius (Carinaulus) jakli Červenka, 2000

Species of beetle

Carinaulus jakli is a species of beetle of the family Scarabaeidae. It is found in China (Gansu).

== Description ==
Adults reach a length of about 5.8 mm (0.23 in). They have a subparallel, convex, dull, glabrous, grey-black body. The legs are black-brown.

== Etymology ==
The species is named in honour of Cetoniinae specialist Stanislav Jákl.
