= Carinaulus tryznai =

Scientific classification
- Kingdom: Animalia
- Phylum: Arthropoda
- Clade: Pancrustacea
- Class: Insecta
- Order: Coleoptera
- Suborder: Polyphaga
- Infraorder: Scarabaeiformia
- Family: Scarabaeidae
- Genus: Carinaulus
- Species: C. tryznai

Binomial name
- Carinaulus tryznai (Červenka, 2000)

Synonyms
- Aphodius (Carinaulus) tryznai Červenka, 2000

Species of beetle

Carinaulus tryznai is a species of beetle of the family Scarabaeidae. It is found in China (Xizang, Sichuan).

== Description ==
Adults reach a length of about 5.8–6.9 mm (0.23–0.27 in). They have an elongate-oval, moderately convex, grey-black, mostly dull body. The elytral intervals are setaceous and the legs are black-brown.

== Etymology ==
The species is named in honour of Anthribidae specialist Milo Trýzna.
