= Carinaulus pucholti =

Scientific classification
- Kingdom: Animalia
- Phylum: Arthropoda
- Clade: Pancrustacea
- Class: Insecta
- Order: Coleoptera
- Suborder: Polyphaga
- Infraorder: Scarabaeiformia
- Family: Scarabaeidae
- Genus: Carinaulus
- Species: C. pucholti

Binomial name
- Carinaulus pucholti (Balthasar, 1961)

Synonyms
- Aphodius (Carinaulus) pucholti Balthasar, 1961

Species of beetle

Carinaulus pucholti is a species of beetle of the family Scarabaeidae. It is found in China (Fujian) and Taiwan.

== Description ==
Adults reach a length of about 4.5 mm (0.18 in). They have an convex body. They elytra are blackish-brown and glossy. The head is lighter, but the pronotum darker reddish-brown. The underside is brown, with the abdomen and legs lighter brown.
