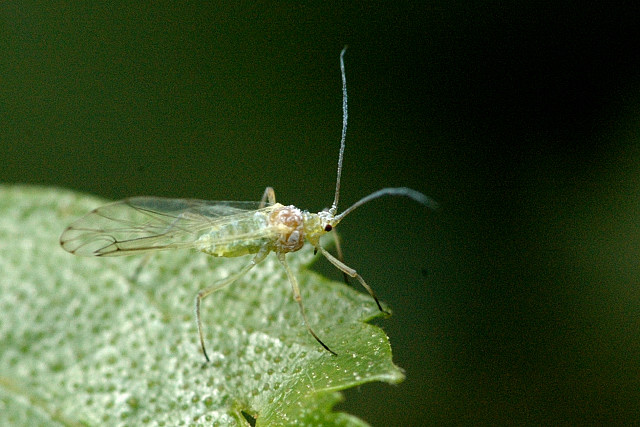
- Euceraphis punctipennis

Scientific classification
- Kingdom: Animalia
- Phylum: Arthropoda
- Class: Insecta
- Order: Hemiptera
- Suborder: Sternorrhyncha
- Family: Aphididae
- Genus: Euceraphis; Walker, 1870

= Euceraphis =

Genus of true bugs

Euceraphis is a genus of aphids belonging to the family Aphididae.

The species of this genus are found in Europe and North America.

== Species ==
The following species are recognised in the genus Euceraphis:

- Euceraphis betulae (Koch, 1855)
- Euceraphis betulijaponicae (Matsumura, 1919)
- Euceraphis punctipennis (Zetterstedt, 1828)
