= Simon S. Rathvon =

American entomologist (1812–1891)

Simon Snyder Rathvon
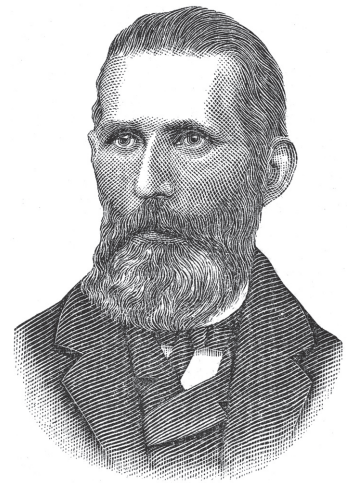
- Born: April 24, 1812; Marietta, Pennsylvania
- Died: March 19, 1891 (aged 78)
- Spouse: Catharine Freyberger
- Children: 11
- Scientific career
- Fields: Entomology
- Author abbrev. (botany): Rathvon
- Author abbrev. (zoology): Rathvon

Simon Snyder Rathvon (1812–1891) was an American tailor and entomologist. He specialized in economic and agricultural entomology. Rathvon was from Lancaster, Pennsylvania, and studied under naturalist Samuel S. Haldeman. He went on to become Professor of Entomology at the Pennsylvania Horticultural Society, editor of the agricultural periodical Lancaster Farmer, and contributed to reports published by the United States Department of Agriculture.

== Biography ==
Rathvon was born on April 24, 1812, in Marietta, Pennsylvania. His mother Catherine Myers was from York County and his father Jacob was a well known gunsmith of German ancestry with the surname originally spelled as Rathfang or Rathfong. At the age of ten he was forced to work on a farm to earn some income for the family as his father went out of business. He only received a very basic schooling. Rathvon apprenticed for a tailor in his teenage years, and by 1832, he opened his own shop in Marietta. He continued the trade for the rest of his career. Although he had an interest in farming, he did not consider himself to have the right build for the work.

In 1832, Rathvon joined the Marietta Thespian Society which helped him boost his self-esteem. Here he met Samuel S. Haldeman, also of his age, who kindled Rathvon's interest in natural history. He was also able to borrow books from others and began to read. The Thespian Society gave him intellectual stimulation and also made him question business and dull routines. Rathvon and Haldeman also established a lyceum of natural history in 1837 which organized a collection of books and specimens. By 1842, entomology had become his primary focus. He published perhaps hundreds of papers on the subject, but the true amount is not known. He was only paid twice for these pursuits—for when he had authored two reports for the USDA in the 1860s.

Rathvon was known for having a quiet, reserved disposition. He struggled with feelings of inadequacy within the scientific community, and felt that his lack of formal education made him unqualified. Despite this, Rathvon was an early advocate for applied agricultural entomology. He argued for using integrated pest and crop management techniques, emphasizing the importance of growers differentiating between beneficial, detrimental, and neutral insects.

Later in his scientific career, Rathvon became Professor of Entomology at the Pennsylvania Horticultural Society and editor of the agricultural periodical Lancaster Farmer. In 1862, Rathvon helped found the Linnaean Society of Lancaster. In 1878, he was awarded an honorary Ph.D. from Franklin and Marshall College.

Rathvon married Catharine Freyberger in 1834 and they had 11 children, with three dying in infancy. Partially deaf since his early 30s, his deafness became total in the 1880s. Rathvon died on March 19, 1891. Although it is stated that he was interred at Shreiner-Concord Cemetery, the exact site of his grave is unknown.

== Legacy ==
Rathvon had a large personal insect collection and purchased the collection of Haldeman. Through this purchase, he also acquired the collections of Nicholas Marcellus Hentz. The Rathvon collection numbered around 10,000 species by 1884. It was later purchased for donation to Franklin and Marshall College. Almost 6,000 of Rathvon's specimens are housed at the North Museum of Nature and Science in Lancaster.

Rathvon is the namesake of several species, including Anatis rathvoni, Lichnanthe rathvoni, and Lytta rathvoni. The subspecies Nebria gebleri rathvoni was also named in his honor by John Lawrence LeConte.
