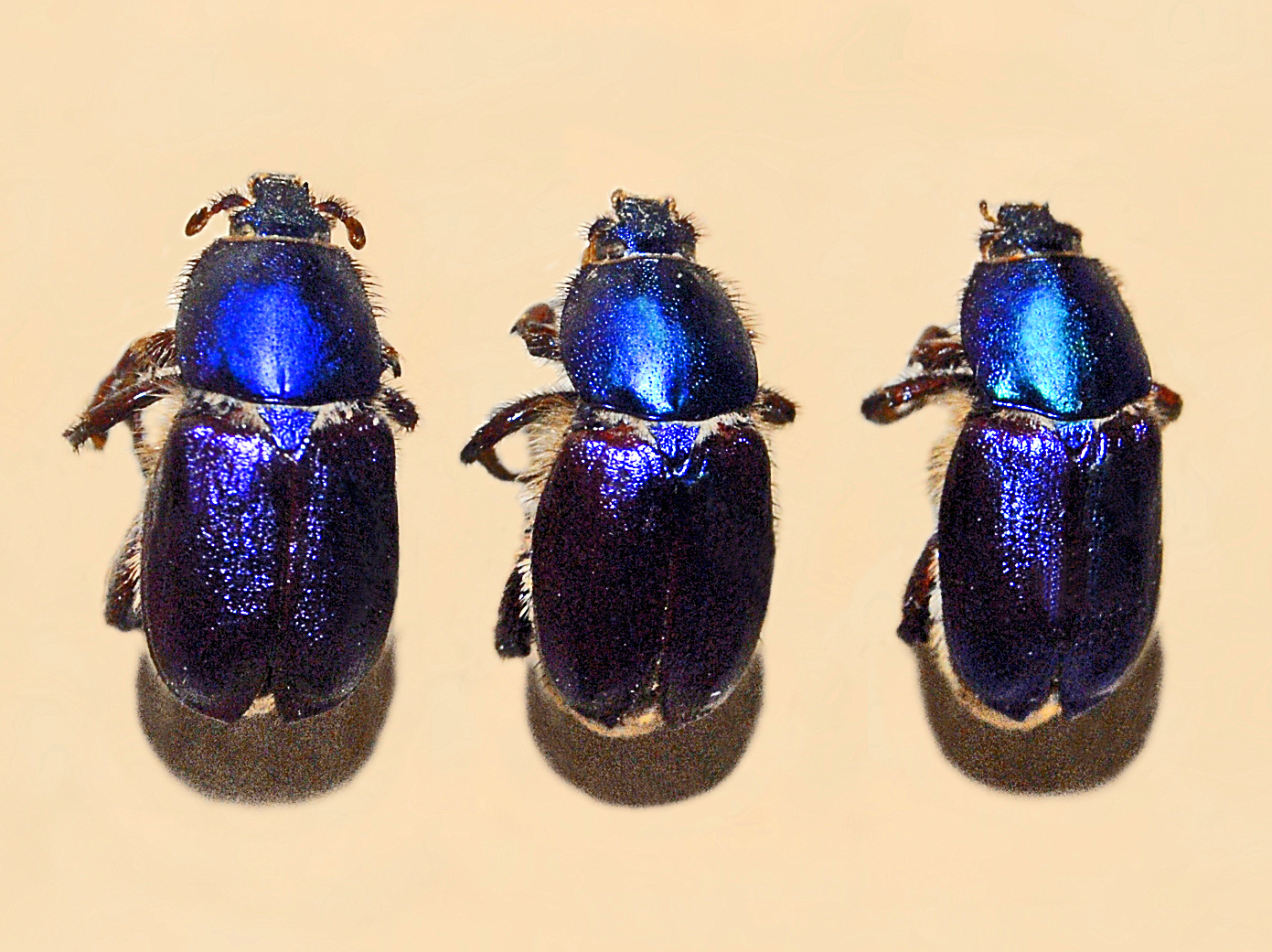
- Glaphyrus maurus

Scientific classification
- Kingdom: Animalia
- Phylum: Arthropoda
- Clade: Pancrustacea
- Class: Insecta
- Order: Coleoptera
- Suborder: Polyphaga
- Infraorder: Scarabaeiformia
- Superfamily: Scarabaeoidea
- Family: Glaphyridae; Macleay, 1819

Genera
- Amphicoma; Anthypna; †Cretohypna; Eulasia; Glaphyrus; Lichnanthe; †Lithohypna; Pygopleurus

= Glaphyridae =

Glaphyridae Temporal range: Aptian–Recent

Family of beetles

Glaphyridae is a family of beetles, commonly known as bumble bee scarab beetles. There are eight extant genera with about 80 species distributed worldwide and two extinct genera described from the Aptian aged Yixian Formation of China. There are cases of flower-beetle interactions, in the southeast Mediterranean region between red bowl-shaped flowers and Glaphyridae beetles.

== See also ==
- List of subgroups of the order Coleoptera
- Pygopleurus hirsutus
