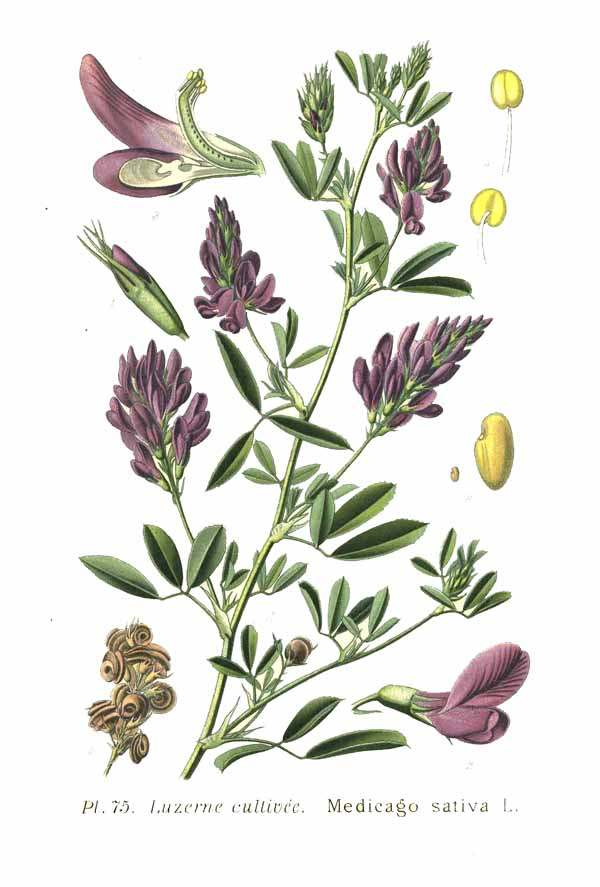
- Medicago sativa

Scientific classification
- Kingdom: Plantae
- Clade: Tracheophytes
- Clade: Angiosperms
- Clade: Eudicots
- Clade: Rosids
- Order: Fabales
- Family: Fabaceae
- Subfamily: Faboideae
- Genus: Medicago
- Section: M. sect. Medicago
- Species: M. sativa

Binomial name
- Medicago sativa L.

Subspecies
- M. sativa subsp. ambigua (Trautv.) Tutin; M. sativa subsp. microcarpa Urban; M. sativa subsp. sativa; M. sativa subsp. varia (T. Martyn) Arcang.

Synonyms
- List: Medica sativa Lam.; Medicago afganica (Bordere) Vassilcz.; Medicago beipinensis Vassilcz.; Medicago coerulea Ledeb. [Spelling variant]; Medicago grandiflora (Grossh.) Vassilcz.; Medicago hemicycla Grossh.; Medicago ladak Vassilcz.; Medicago lavrenkoi Vassilcz.; Medicago media Pers.; Medicago mesopotamica Vassilcz.; Medicago ochroleuca Kult.; Medicago orientalis Vassilcz.; Medicago polia (Brand) Vassilcz.; Medicago praesativa Sinskaya; Medicago rivularis Vassilcz.; Medicago sogdiana (Brand) Vassilcz.; Medicago subdicycla (Trautv.) Vassilcz.; Medicago sylvestris Fr.; Medicago tianschanica Vassilcz.; Medicago tibetana (Alef.) Vassilcz.; Medicago trautvetteri Sumnev.; Medicago varia Martyn; Trigonella upendrae H.J.Chowdhery & R.R.Rao

= Alfalfa =

Plant species in pea family

Medicago sativa, commonly known as alfalfa (/ælˈfælfə/) in North America and lucerne (/luːˈsɜːrn/) in the United Kingdom, South Africa, and Australia, is a perennial flowering plant in the legume family, Fabaceae.

Native to warmer temperate climates, alfalfa has long been cultivated as livestock fodder, perhaps since antiquity. It is an important forage crop in many countries around the world and is used for grazing, hay, and silage.

== Description ==
Alfalfa is a perennial forage legume which normally lives four to eight years but can live more than 20 years, depending on variety and climate. The plant grows to a height of up to 1 metre (3 1/2 feet). Its root system typically grows to a depth of 2–3 m (7–10 ft) depending on subsoil constraints but sometimes grows to a depth of more than 15 m (49 ft) to reach groundwater.

The leaves are typically trifoliolate. The plant has clusters of 5–20 florets, which are usually purple but can be blue, yellow, or cream. The small seeds are yellowish.

The species has an autotetraploid genome with tetrasomic inheritance.

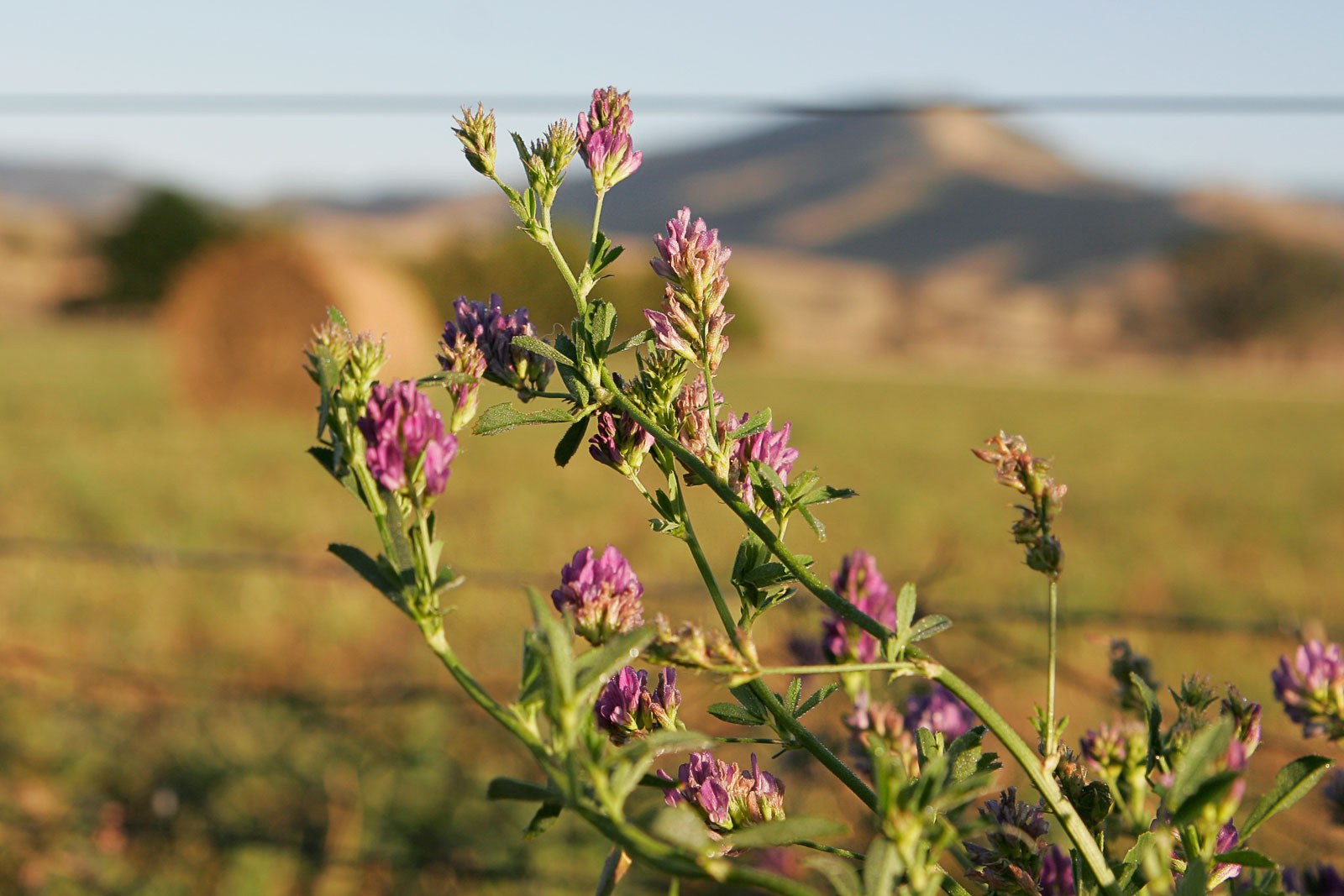
Foliage and flowers

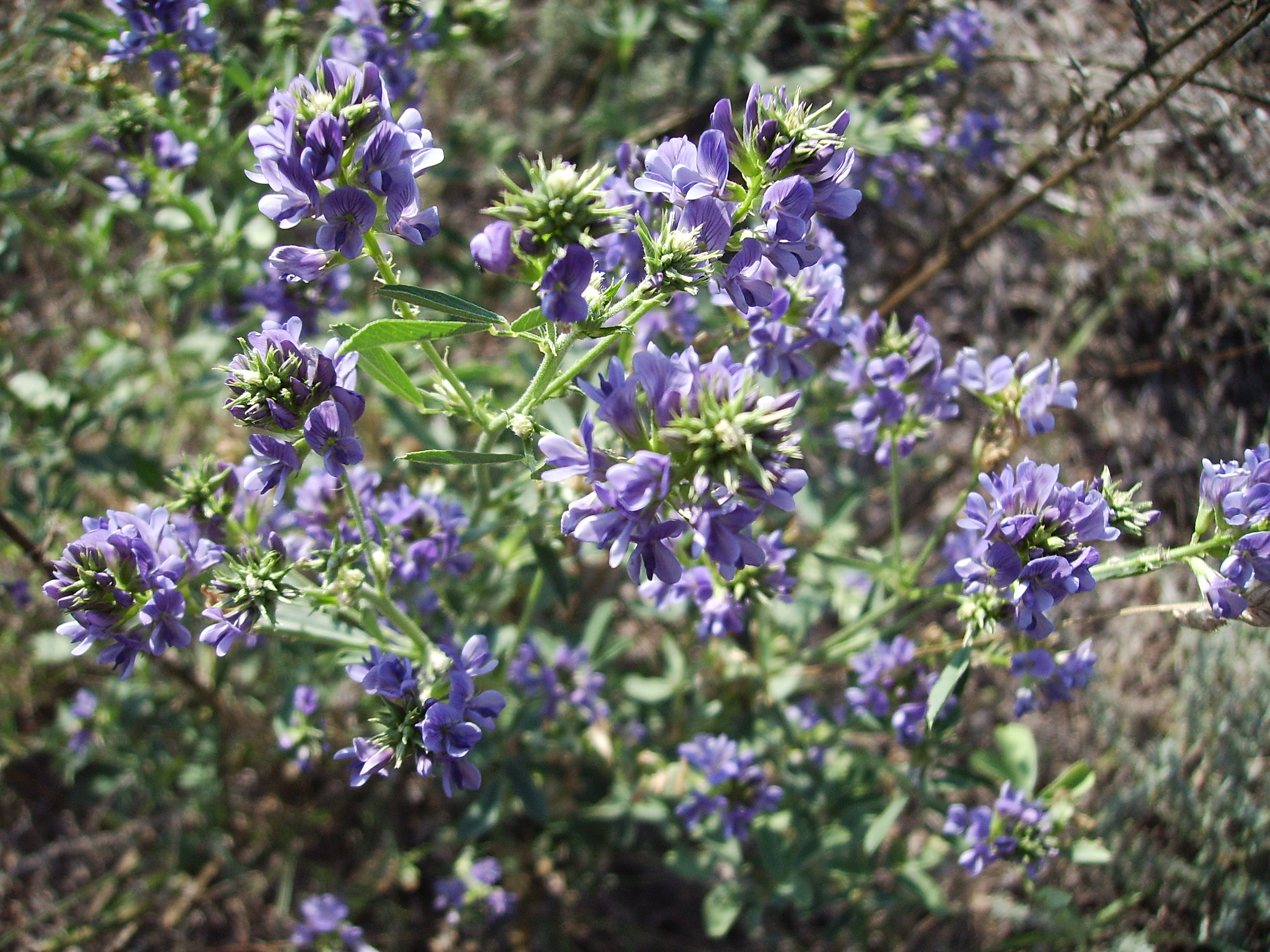
Flowers

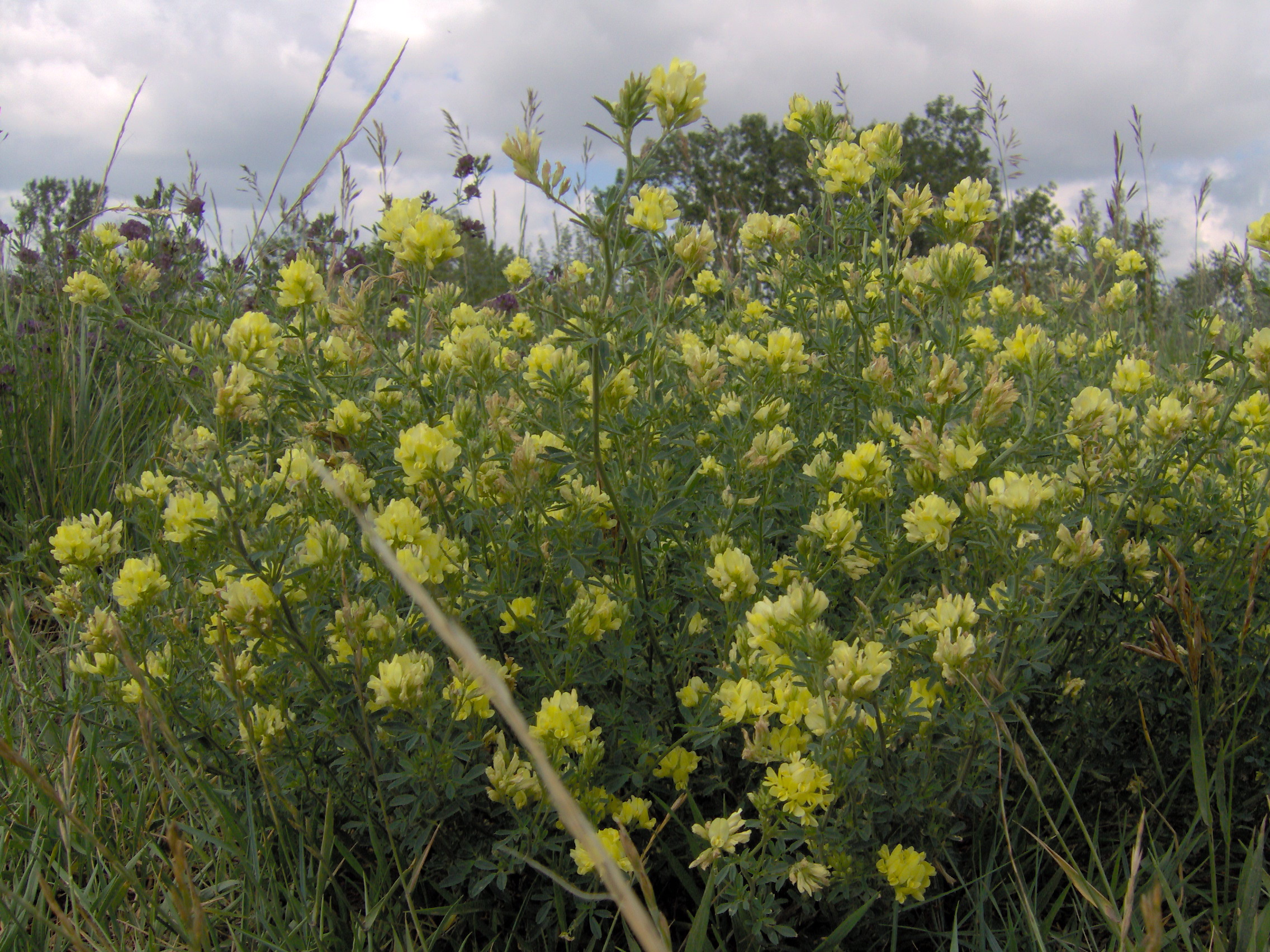
Yellow flowers

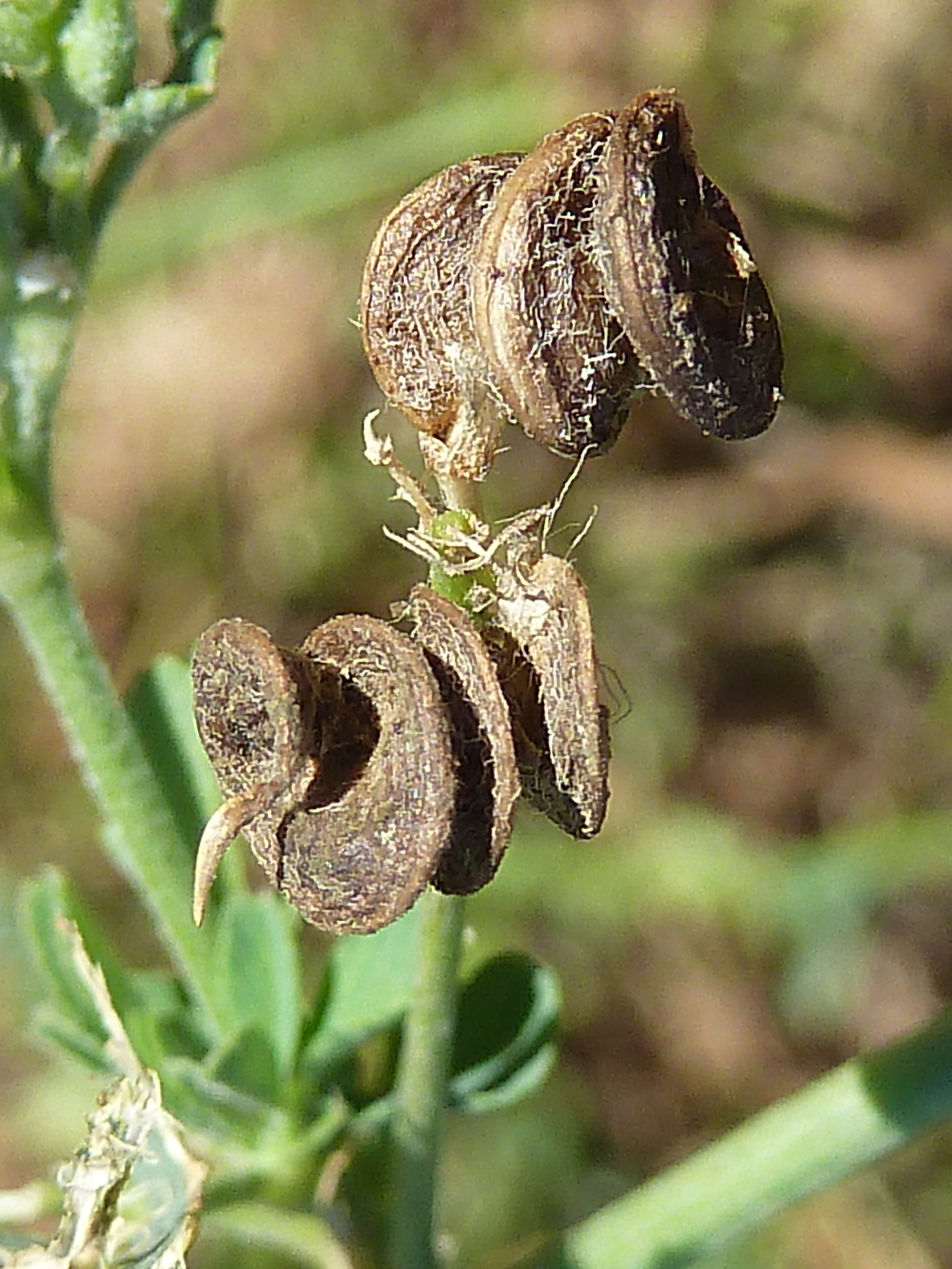
Mature fruits of M. sativa var. sativa

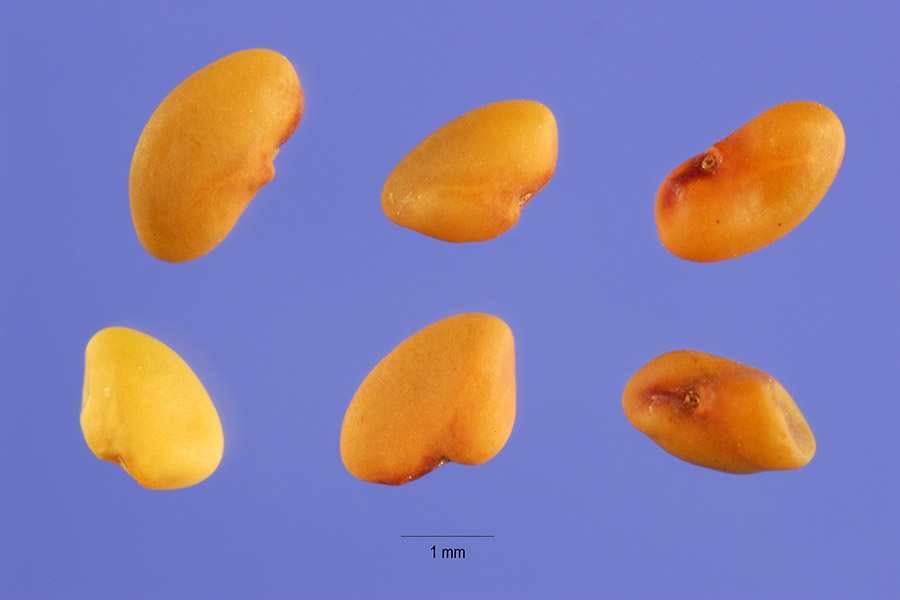
Seeds (actual size ≈ 2mm)

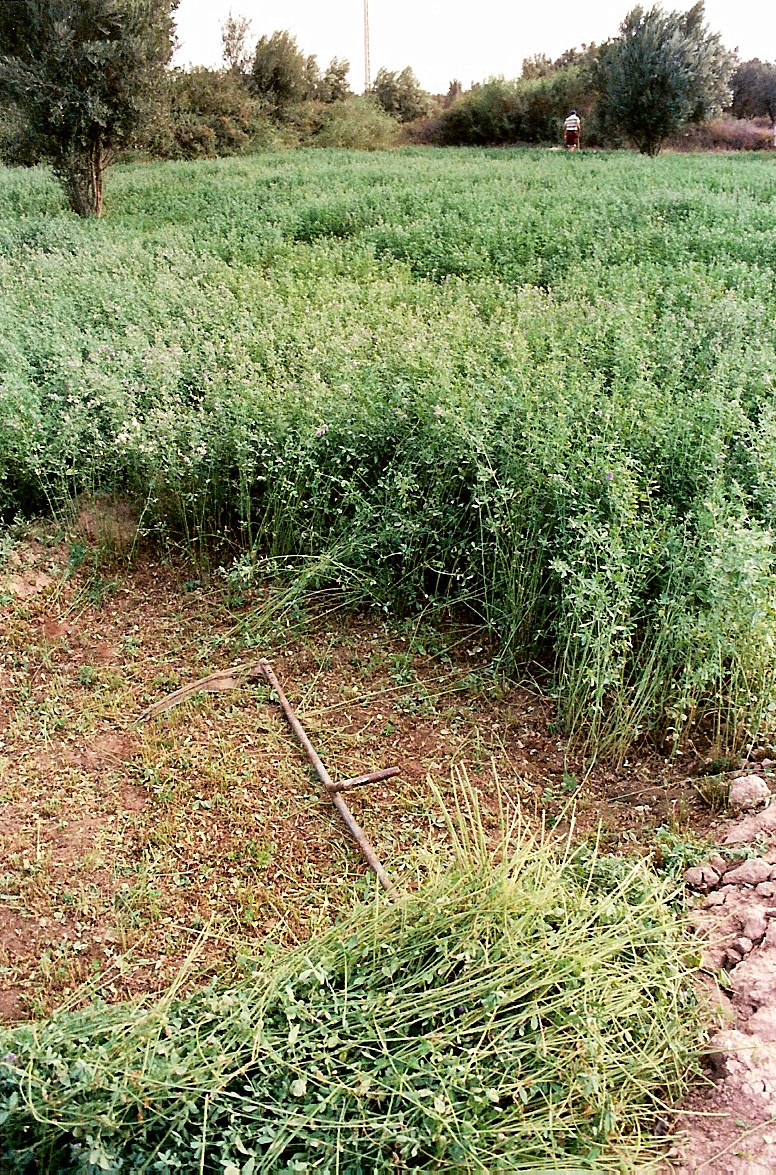
Lucerne field

== Etymology ==
According to Merriam-Webster, English use of alfalfa dates to 1791 and derives from the identical cognate in Spanish, whose origin is al-faṣfaṣa, of an Arabic dialect. Etymology Online suggests that alfalfa derives from the same Spanish cognate (c. 1845), from the Spanish predecessor alfalfez; according to "Iberian sources" the word's root was al-fisfisa, claimed to mean "fresh fodder". Linguist Calvert Watkins suggested that the Arabic word might derive from an Old Iranian compound meaning "horse food".

Lucerne, or lucern, as a synonym for alfalfa was borrowed from French, first appearing in written English in 1652. The French word was itself a borrowing from the Occitan luzerno, meaning "glowworm", likely a reference to the bright yellow seeds of some strains of alfalfa.

== Ecology ==
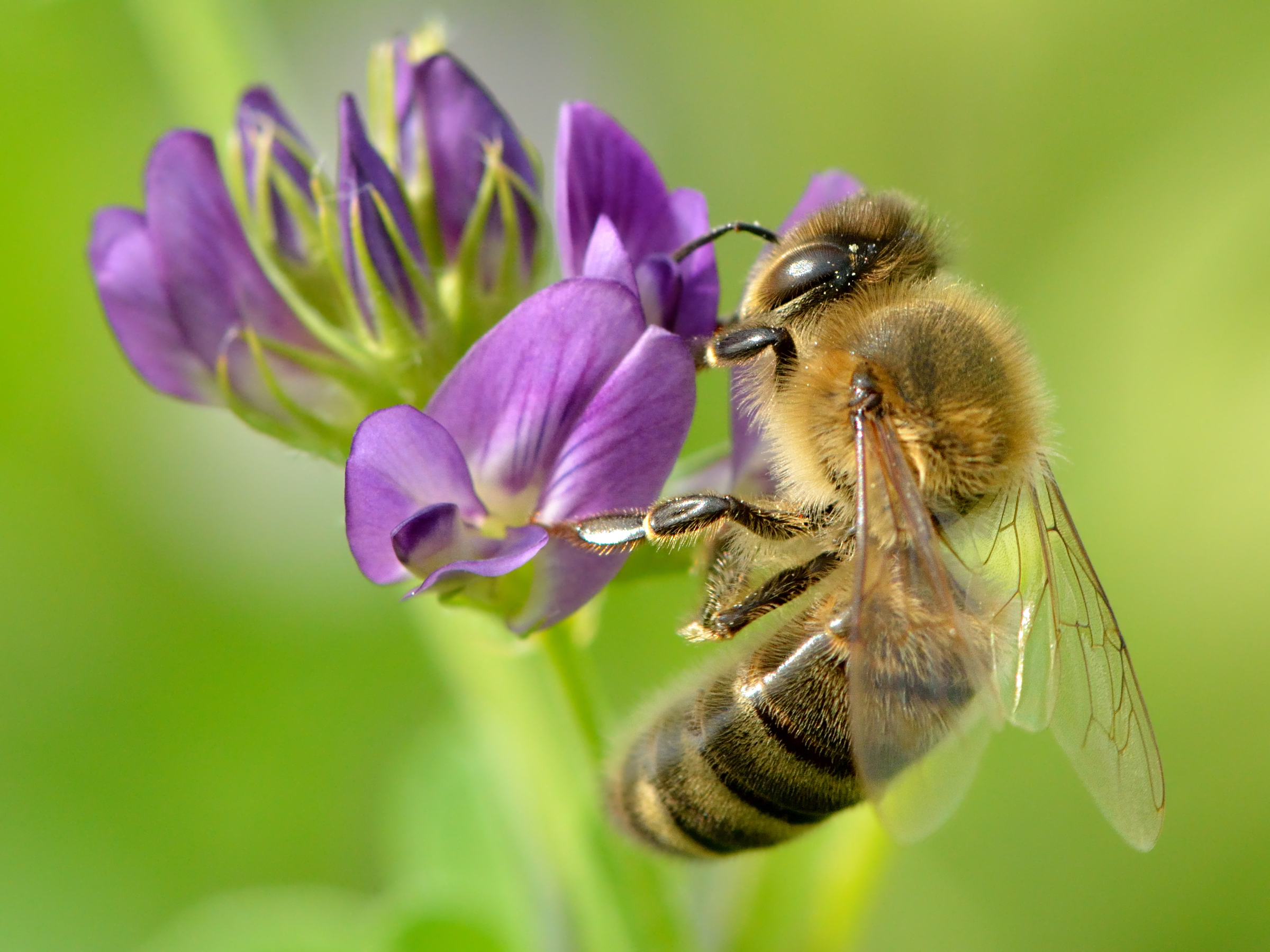
Honey bee (Apis mellifera), a pollinator on alfalfa flower

Alfalfa is considered an insectary plant and may help other crops such as cotton because it harbours predatory and parasitic insects that would protect the other crop if the two were interplanted. Harvesting the alfalfa by mowing the entire crop area destroys the insect population; this can be avoided by mowing in strips so that part of the growth remains.

Alfalfa develops extensive taproots that can extend around 6 feet per year in loose soil. This allows the plant to access soil moisture that is not accessible to plants with shallow root systems, making it more resistant to droughts and soil erosion. This depth of root system, and perenniality of crowns that store carbohydrates as an energy reserve, makes it very resilient.

Alfalfa exhibits autotoxicity, which means it is difficult for alfalfa seed to grow in existing stands of alfalfa. Therefore, alfalfa fields are recommended to be rotated with other species (for example, corn or wheat) before reseeding. The exact mechanism of autotoxicity is unclear, with medicarpins and phenols both seeming to play a role. The level of autotoxicity in soil depends on soil type (clay soils maintain autotoxicity for longer), cultivar and age of the previous crop. A soil assay can be used to measure autotoxicity. Resistance to autotoxicity also varies by cultivar, a tolerant one being 'WL 656HQ'.

=== Pests and diseases ===
Like most plants, alfalfa can be attacked by various pests and pathogens. Diseases often have subtle symptoms which are easily misdiagnosed and can affect the leaves, roots, stems, and blossoms.

Some pests, such as the alfalfa weevil, aphids, and potato leafhopper, and the seedcorn maggot, Delia platura, can reduce alfalfa yields dramatically, particularly with the second cutting when weather is warmest. Spotted alfalfa aphid, broadly spread in Australia, sucks sap and injects salivary toxins into the leaves. Registered insecticides or chemical controls are sometimes used to prevent this, and labels will specify the withholding period before the forage crop can be grazed or cut for hay or silage. Alfalfa is susceptible to root rots, including Phytophthora, Rhizoctonia, and Texas root rot. Alfalfa is also susceptible to downy mildew caused by the oomycete species Peronospora aestivalis.

== Cultivation ==
=== History ===
Alfalfa is believed to have originated in south-central Asia and was first cultivated in Central Asia. According to Pliny (died 79 AD), it was introduced to Greece in about 490 BC when the Persians invaded Greek territory. It became known as the "Median [i.e., Iranian] grass". Alfalfa cultivation is discussed in the fourth-century AD book Opus Agriculturae by Palladius, stating:

One sow-down lasts ten years. The crop may be cut four or six times a year ... A jugerum of it is abundantly sufficient for three horses all the year ... It may be given to cattle, but new provender is at first to be administered very sparingly, because it bloats up the cattle.

The medieval Arabic agricultural writer Ibn al-'Awwam, who lived in Spain during the latter part of the 12th century, discussed how to cultivate alfalfa, which he called الفصفصة (al-fiṣfiṣa). A 13th-century general-purpose Arabic dictionary, Lisān al-'Arab, says that alfalfa is cultivated as an animal feed and consumed in both fresh and dried forms.

In the 16th century, Spanish colonists introduced alfalfa to the Americas as fodder for their horses.

In the North American colonies of the eastern US in the 18th century, it was called "alfalfa", and many trials at growing it were made, but generally without sufficiently successful results. Relatively little is grown in the southeastern US today. Alfalfa seeds were imported to California from Chile in the 1850s. That was the beginning of a rapid and extensive introduction of the crop over the western US and introduced the word "alfalfa" to the English language. Since North and South America now produce a large part of the world's output, the word "alfalfa" has been slowly entering other languages.

=== Modern cultivation ===
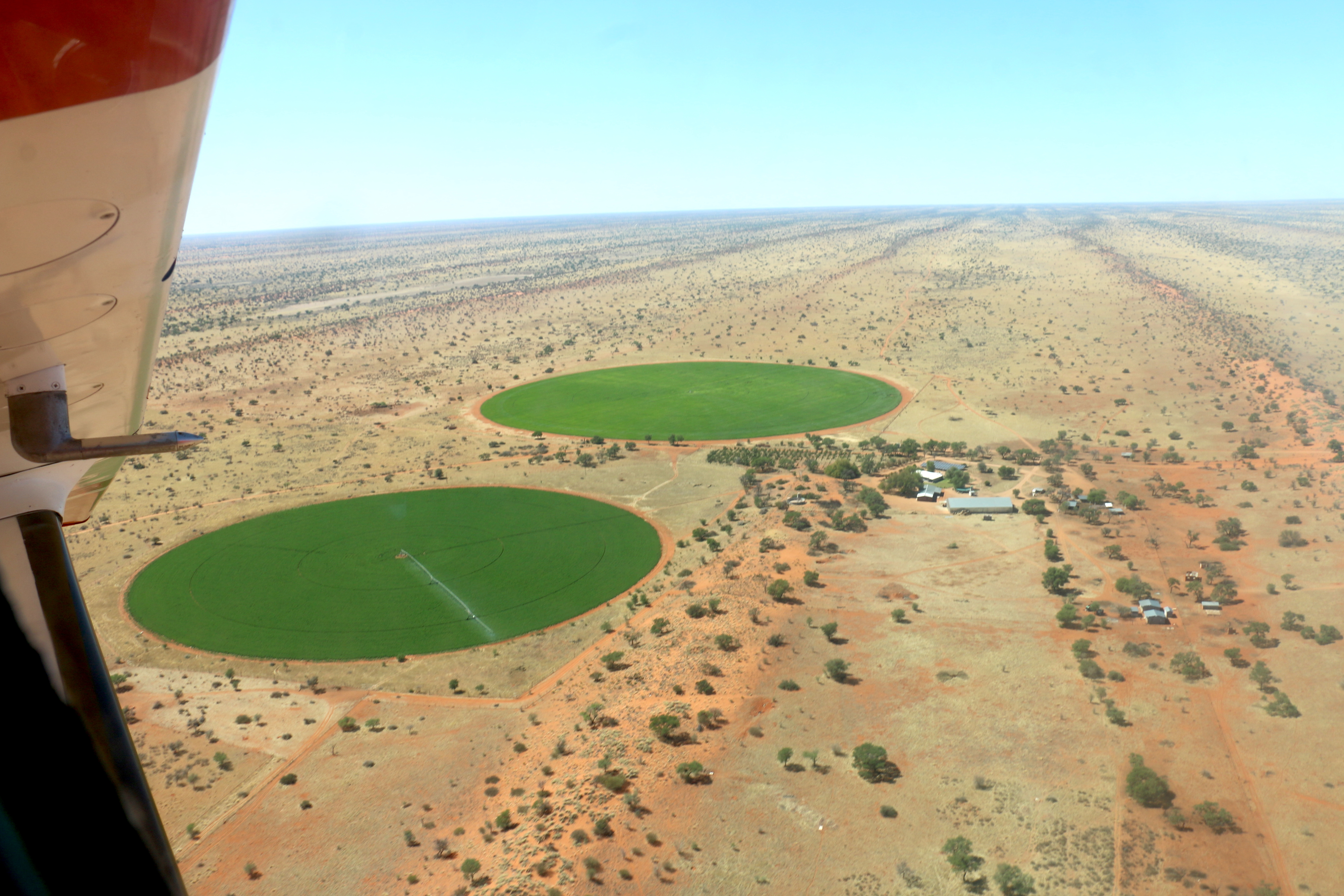
Alfalfa fields in the Kalahari Desert (2017) 24°20′21.5″S 018°35′36.4″E

Alfalfa is widely grown throughout the world as forage for cattle. It is most often harvested as hay but can also be made into silage, grazed, or fed as greenchop. Alfalfa usually has the highest feeding value of all common hay crops. It is used less frequently as pasture. When grown on soils where it is well-adapted, alfalfa is often the highest-yielding forage plant, but its primary benefit is the combination of high yield per hectare and high nutritional quality.

Its primary use is as feed for high-producing dairy cows because of its high protein content and highly digestible fiber, and secondarily for beef cattle, horses, sheep, and goats. Alfalfa hay is a widely used protein and fiber source for meat rabbits. In poultry diets, dehydrated alfalfa and alfalfa leaf concentrates are used for pigmenting eggs and meat because of their high carotenoid content, which makes them efficient at colouring egg yolk and body lipids. Humans also eat alfalfa sprouts in salads and sandwiches. Dehydrated alfalfa leaf is commercially available as a dietary supplement in several forms, such as tablets, powders and tea. Fresh alfalfa can cause bloating in livestock, so care must be taken with livestock grazing on alfalfa.

Alfalfa engages in symbiotic nitrogen fixation with nitrogen-fixing bacteria called rhizobia, including Sinorhizobium meliloti. This symbiosis results in the formation of indeterminate nodules (continuously growing) which grow on the root on the root hairs. S. meliloti, once inside the nodule, will terminally differentiate into bacteroids in which they lose the ability to return to free-living growth in soil. The bacteroids fix atmospheric nitrogen into bioavailable forms such as ammonia. Bacteroids are provided with carbohydrates for growth and return usable nitrogen to the plant. This mutualistic interaction improves soil nitrogen fertility as plant matter is accumulated in the surrounding soil.

Symbiosis allows Alfalfa to produce a nutritious feed regardless of available nitrogen in the soil. Its nitrogen-fixing ability (which increases soil nitrogen) and its use as an animal feed greatly improve agricultural efficiency.

Alfalfa can be sown in spring or fall and does best on well-drained soils with a neutral pH of 6.8–7.5. Alfalfa requires sustained levels of potassium and phosphorus to grow well. It is moderately sensitive to salt levels in both the soil and irrigation water, although it continues to be grown in the arid southwestern United States, where salinity is an emerging issue. Soils low in fertility should be fertilized with manure or a chemical fertilizer, but correction of pH is particularly important. Usually a seeding rate of 13–20 kg/ha (12–18 lb/acre) is recommended, with differences based upon region, soil type, and seeding method. A nurse crop is sometimes used, particularly for spring plantings, to reduce weed problems and soil erosion, but can lead to competition for light, water, and nutrients.

In most climates, alfalfa is cut three to four times a year, but it can be harvested up to 12 times per year in Arizona and southern California. Total yields are typically around 8 tonnes per hectare (3 1/2 short tons per acre) in temperate environments, but yields have been recorded up to 20 tonnes per hectare (9 short tons per acre). Yields vary with region, weather, and the crop's stage of maturity when cut. Later cuttings improve yield, but with reduced nutritional content.

=== Harvesting ===
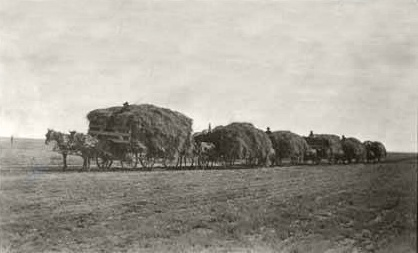
Alfalfa hay on the way to Clayton, New Mexico, circa 1915.

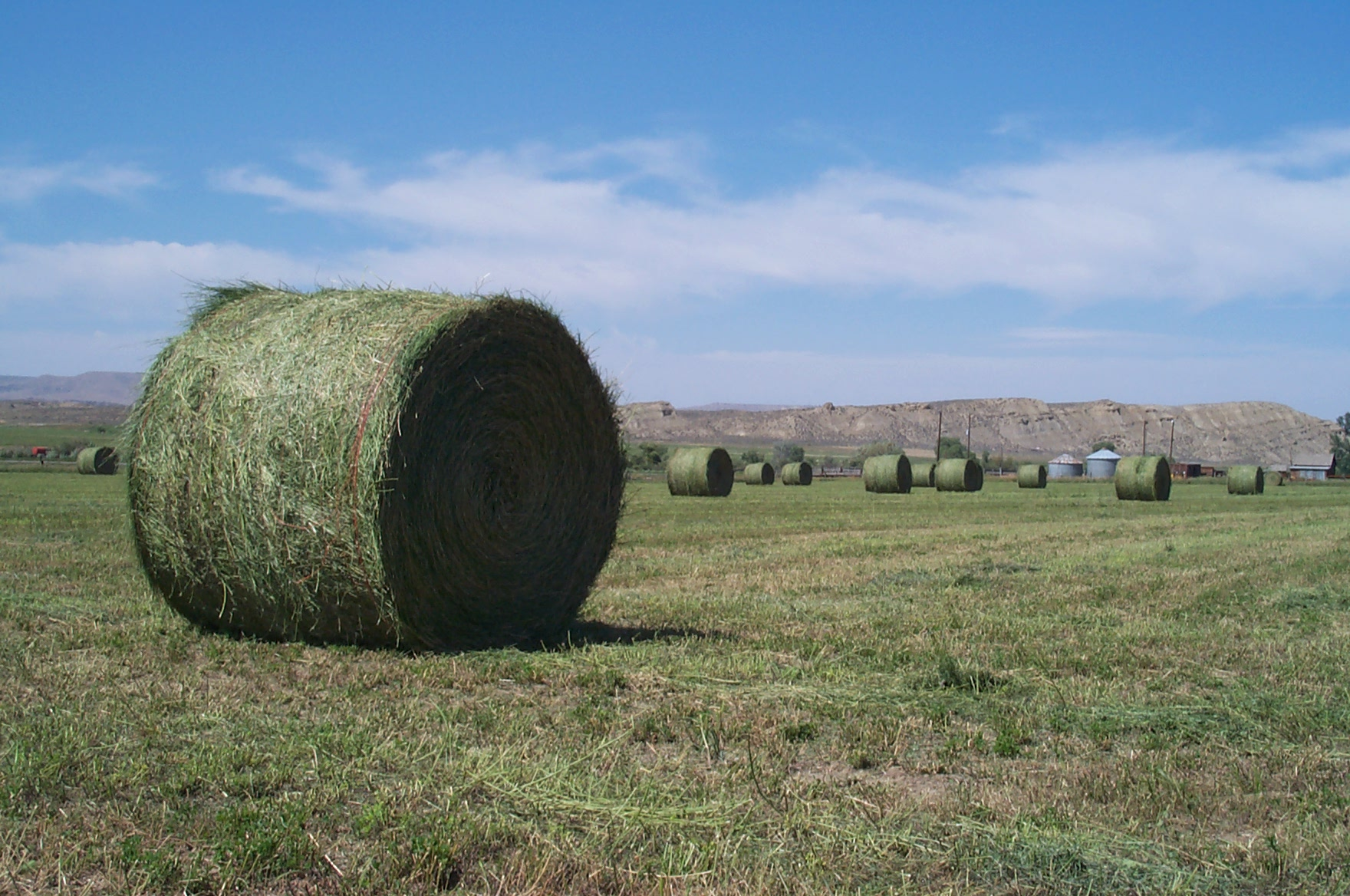
Cylindrical bales of alfalfa

When alfalfa is to be used as hay, it is usually cut and baled. Loose haystacks are still used in some areas, but bales are easier for use in transportation, storage, and feed. Ideally, the first cutting should be taken at the bud stage, and the subsequent cuttings just as the field is beginning to flower, or one-tenth bloom because carbohydrates are at their highest. When using farm equipment rather than hand-harvesting, a swather cuts the alfalfa and arranges it in windrows. In areas where the alfalfa does not immediately dry out on its own, a machine known as a mower-conditioner is used to cut the hay. The mower-conditioner has a set of rollers or flails that crimp and break the stems as they pass through the mower, making the alfalfa dry faster. After the alfalfa has dried, a tractor pulling a baler collects the hay into bales.

Several types of bales are commonly used for alfalfa. For small animals and individual horses, the alfalfa is baled into small, two-string bales, commonly named by the strands of string used to wrap it. Other bale sizes are three-string, and so on up to half-ton (six-string) "square" bales – actually rectangular, and typically about 40 cm × 45 cm × 100 cm (16 in × 18 in × 39 in). Small square bales weigh from 25 to 30 kg (55 to 66 lb) depending on moisture, and can be easily hand separated into "flakes". Cattle ranches use large round bales, typically 1.4 to 1.8 m (4 1/2 to 6 ft) in diameter and weighing from 500 to 1,000 kg (1,100 to 2,200 lb). These bales can be placed in stable stacks or in large feeders for herds of horses or unrolled on the ground for large herds of cattle. The bales can be loaded and stacked with a tractor using a spike, known as a bale spear that pierces the center of the bale, or they can be handled with a grapple (claw) on the tractor's front-end loader.

When used as feed for dairy cattle, alfalfa is often made into haylage by a process known as ensiling. Rather than being dried to make dry hay, the alfalfa is chopped finely and fermented in silos, trenches, or bags, where the oxygen supply can be limited to promote fermentation. The anaerobic fermentation of alfalfa allows it to retain high nutrient levels similar to those of fresh forage and is more palatable to dairy cattle than dry hay. In many cases, alfalfa silage is inoculated with different strains of microorganisms to improve the fermentation quality and aerobic stability of the silage.

=== Production ===
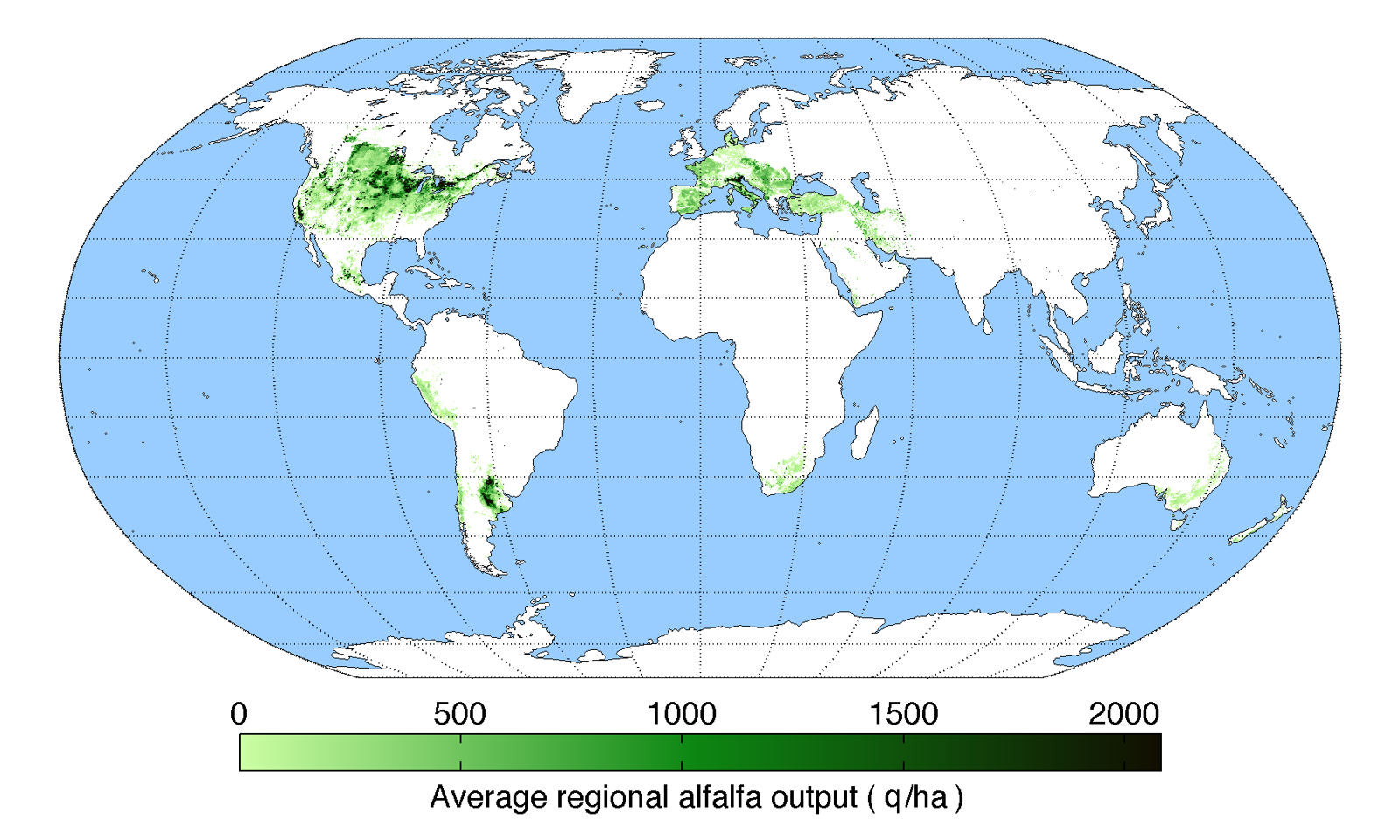
Worldwide alfalfa production

During the early 2000s, alfalfa was the most cultivated forage legume in the world. Worldwide production was around 436 million tons in 2006. In 2009, alfalfa was grown on approximately 30 million hectares (74 million acres) worldwide; of this North America produced 41% (11.9 million hectares; 29 million acres), Europe produced 25% (7.12 million hectares; 17.6 million acres), South America produced 23% (7 million hectares; 17 million acres), Asia produced 8% (2.23 million hectares; 5.5 million acres), and Africa and Oceania produced the remainder. The US was the largest alfalfa producer in the world by area in 2009, with 9 million hectares (22 million acres), but considerable production area is found in Argentina (6.9 million hectares; 17 million acres), Canada (2 million hectares; 4.9 million acres), Russia (1.8 million hectares; 4.4 million acres), Italy (1.3 million hectares; 3.2 million acres), and China (1.3 million hectares; 3.2 million acres).

==== United States ====
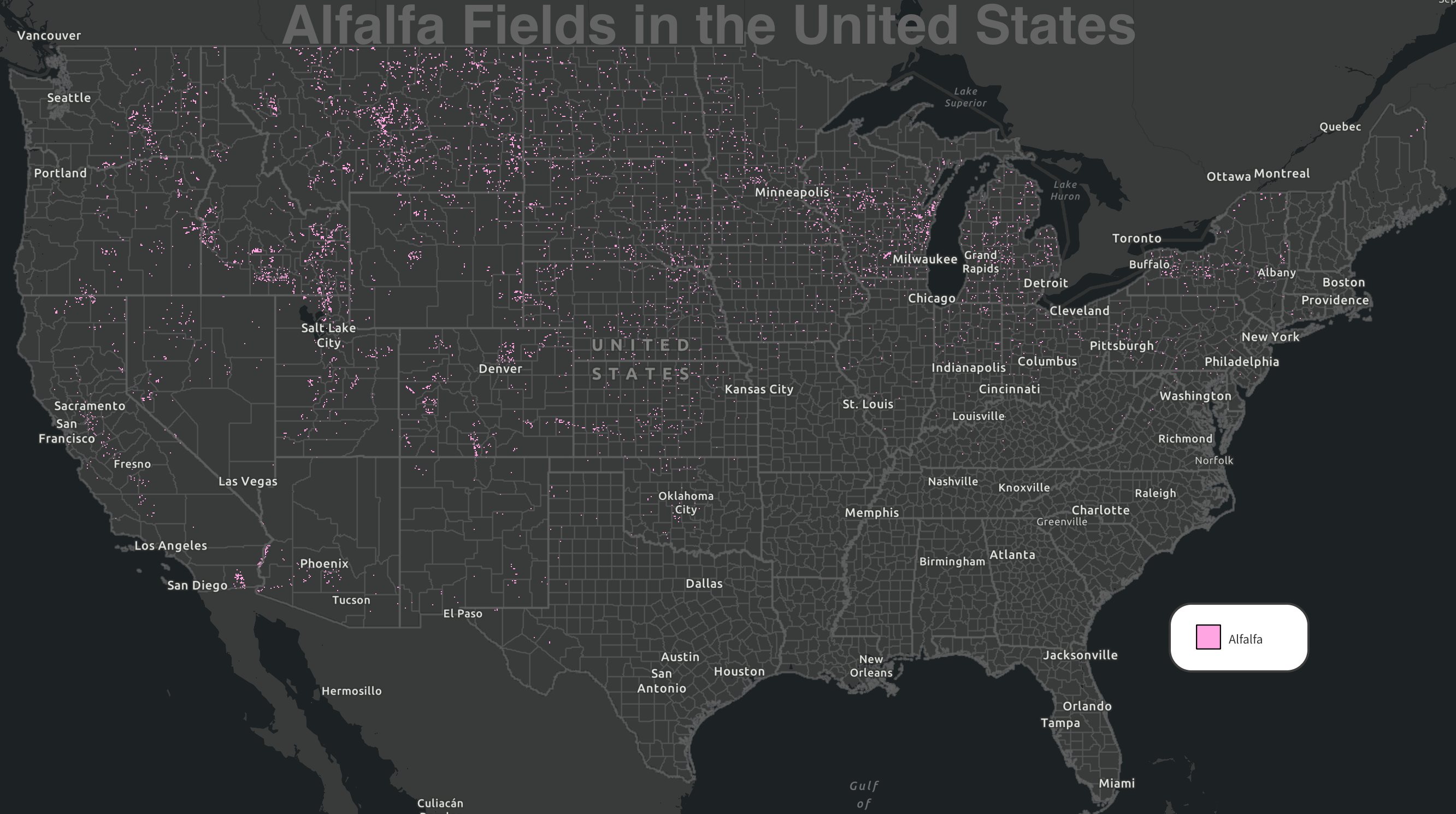
Alfalfa fields in the United States

In the United States in 2012, the leading alfalfa-growing states were California, Idaho, and Montana. Alfalfa is predominantly grown in the northern and western US; it can be grown in the southeastern US, but leaf and root diseases, poor soils, and a lack of well-adapted varieties are often limitations.

In California, varieties resistant to the spotted alfalfa aphid (Therioaphis maculata) are necessary, but even that is not always enough due to constant resistance evolution.

==== Australia ====
Alfalfa grown in Australia prior to the 1970s was from seed brought from Great Britain in the early years of colonization, with production most successful in the Hunter River and Peel River valleys. Hunter River cv. was the first alfalfa variety developed for the Australian environment and was bred from selections of pre-existing alfalfa stands in the Upper Hunter River region. Pest burdens from the spotted alfalfa aphid in the 1970s caused significant destruction of New South Wales alfalfa paddocks, with surviving populations being used as parents for Hunterfield cv. (released 1983). This variety showed significant improvement of resistance to spotted alfalfa aphid.

New South Wales produces 40% of Australia's alfalfa. Due to the introduction of the spotted alfalfa aphid (Therioaphis maculata) in 1977, all varieties grown there must be resistant to it. South Australia is home to 83% of all alfalfa seed production in Australia. Much of this seed industry is centred around the town of Keith, South Australia, also encompassing the neighbouring localities of Tintinara, Bordertown, Willalooka, Padthaway and Naracoorte.

=== Alfalfa and bees ===
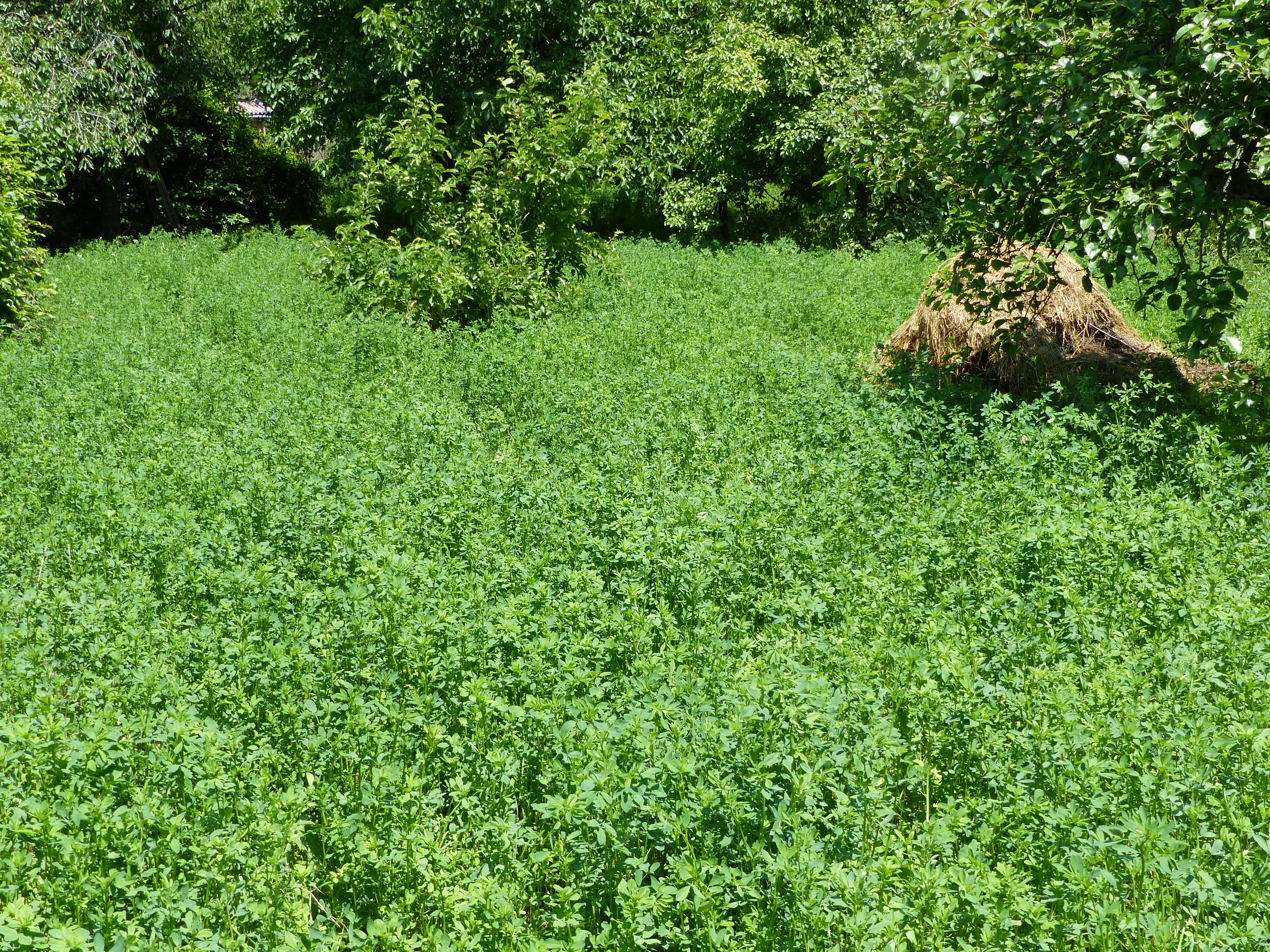
Alfalfa field

Alfalfa seed production requires the presence of pollinators when the fields of alfalfa are in bloom. Alfalfa pollination is somewhat challenging because western honey bees, the most commonly used pollinator, are less than ideal for this purpose. The pollen-carrying keel of the alfalfa flower trips and strikes pollinating bees on the head, which helps transfer the pollen to the foraging bee. Western honey bees learn to avoid being struck on the head by drawing nectar from the side of the flower. The bees thus collect the nectar but carry no pollen, so they do not pollinate the next flower they visit. Because older, experienced bees do not pollinate alfalfa well, most pollination is accomplished by young bees that have not yet learned the trick of robbing the flower without tripping the head-knocking keel.

When western honey bees are used to pollinate alfalfa, the beekeeper stocks the field at a very high rate to maximize the number of young bees. However, western honey bee colonies may suffer protein stress when working alfalfa only because alfalfa pollen protein is deficient in isoleucine, one of the amino acids essential in the diet of honeybee larvae.

Today, the alfalfa leafcutter bee (Megachile rotundata) is increasingly used to circumvent these problems. As a solitary but gregarious bee species, it does not build colonies or store honey but is a very efficient pollinator of alfalfa flowers. The species nests in individual tunnels in wooden or plastic material, supplied by the alfalfa seed growers. The leafcutter bees are used in the Pacific Northwest, while western honeybees dominate in California alfalfa seed production.

M. rotundata was unintentionally introduced into the US during the 1940s, and its management as a pollinator of alfalfa has led to a three-fold increase in seed production in the US. The synchronous emergence of the adult bees of this species during alfalfa blooming period in combination with such behaviors as gregarious nesting, and utilization of leaves and nesting materials that have been mass-produced by humans provide positive benefits for the use of these bees in pollinating alfalfa.

A smaller amount of alfalfa produced for seed is pollinated by the alkali bee, mostly in the northwestern US. It is cultured in special beds near the fields. These bees also have their own problems. They are not portable like honey bees, and when fields are planted in new areas, the bees take several seasons to build up. Honey bees are still trucked to many of the fields at bloom time.

The rusty patched bumble bee, Bombus affinis, is important to the agricultural industry as well as for the pollination of alfalfa. It is known that members of this species pollinate up to 65 different species of plants, and it is the primary pollinator of key dietary crops, such as cranberries, plums, apples, onions, and alfalfa.

=== Varieties ===
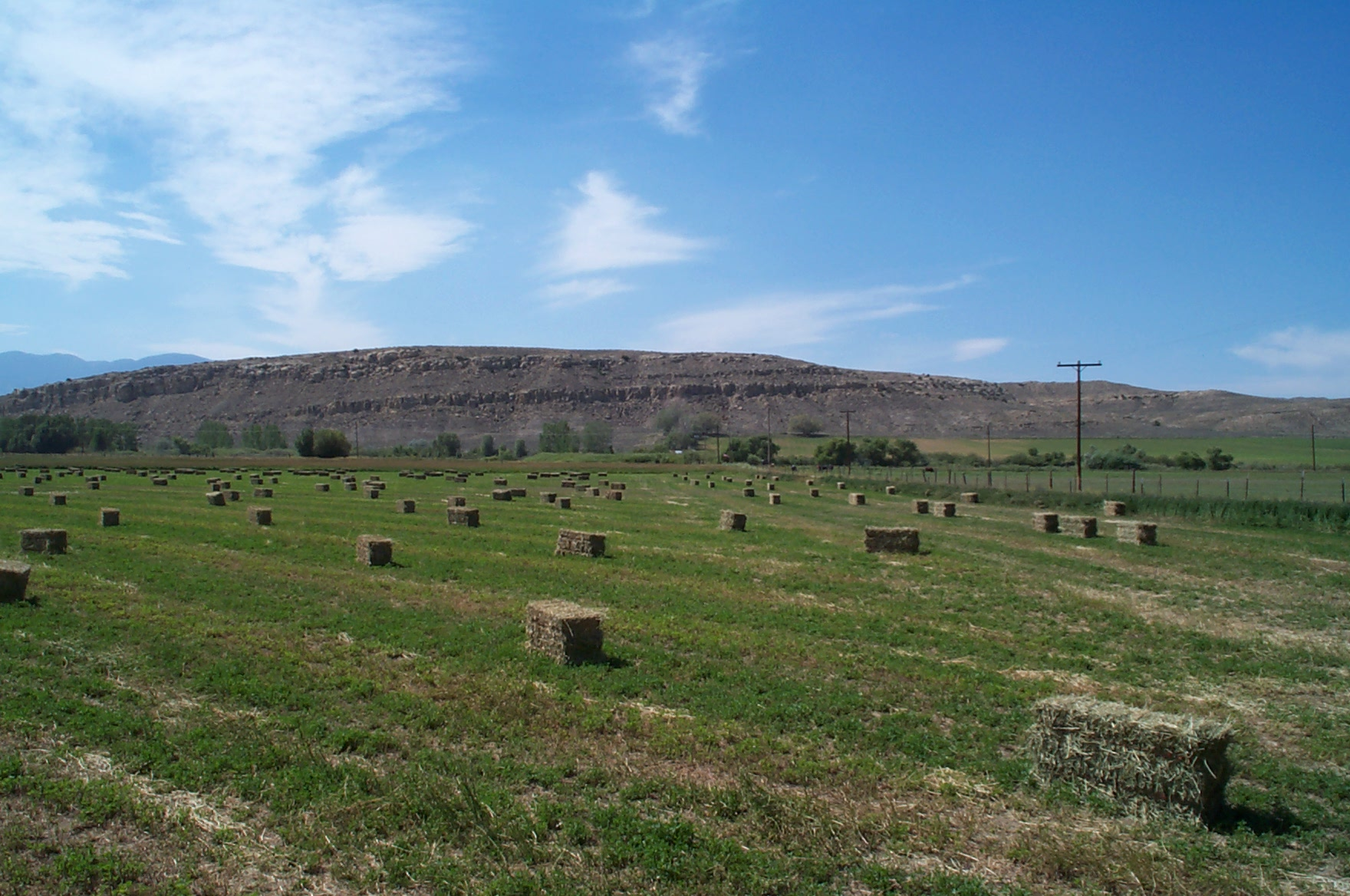
Small square bales of alfalfa

Considerable research and development has been done with alfalfa. Older cultivars such as 'Vernal' have been the standard for years, but many public and private varieties better adapted to particular climates are available. Private companies release many new varieties each year in the US.

Most varieties go dormant in the fall, with reduced growth in response to low temperatures and shorter days. 'Nondormant' varieties that grow through the winter are planted in long-season environments such as Mexico, Arizona, and Southern California, whereas 'dormant' varieties are planted in the Upper Midwest, Canada, and the Northeast. 'Nondormant' varieties can be higher-yielding, but they are susceptible to winter-kill in cold climates and have poorer persistence.

Most alfalfa cultivars contain genetic material from sickle medick (M. falcata), a crop wild relative of alfalfa that naturally hybridizes with M. sativa to produce sand lucerne (M. sativa ssp. varia). This species may bear either the purple flowers of alfalfa or the yellow of sickle medick, and is so called for its ready growth in sandy soil. Traits for insect resistance have also been introduced from M. glomerata and M. prostrata, members of alfalfa's secondary gene pool.

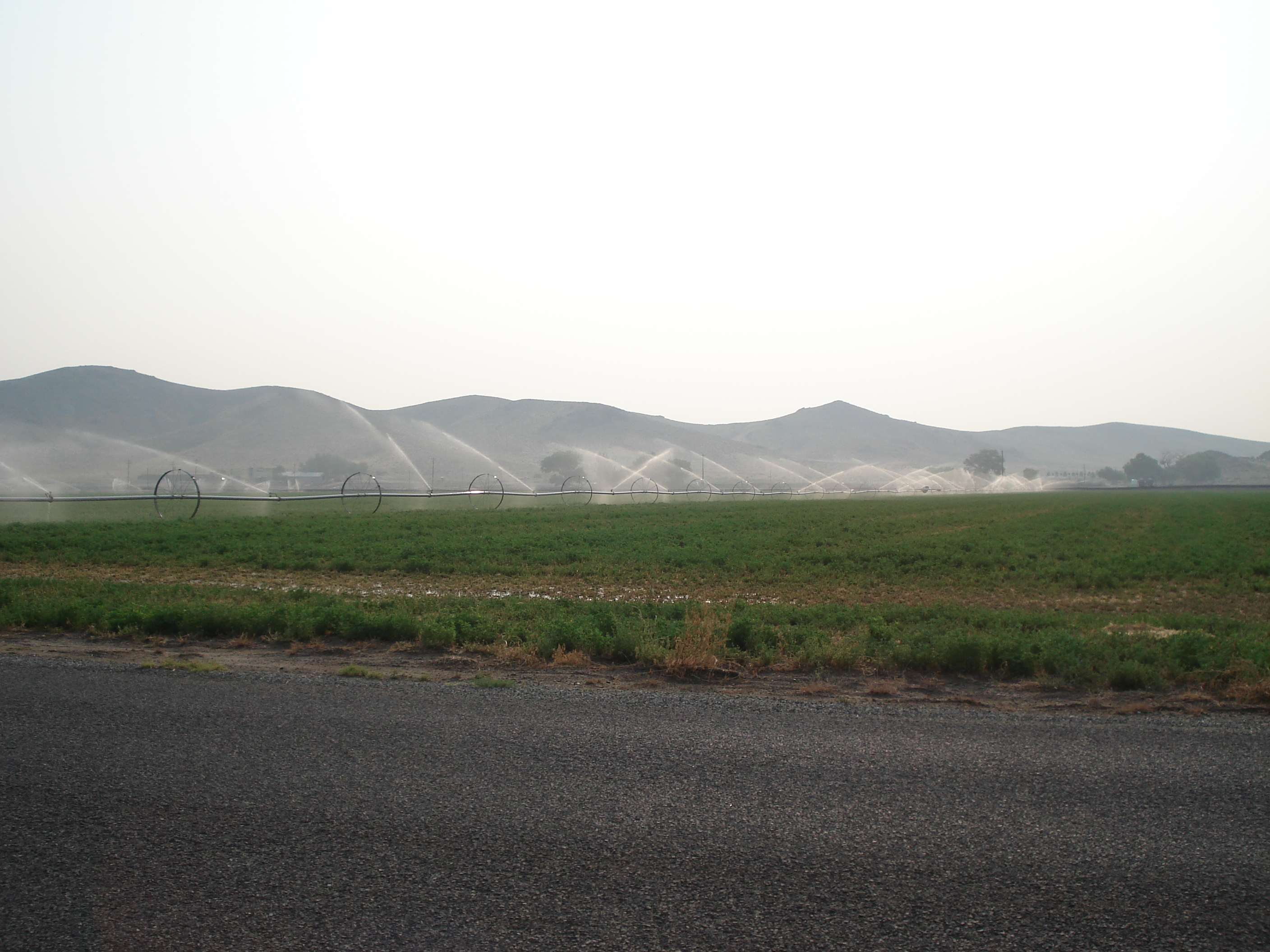
Watering an alfalfa field

==== Genetic modification ====
Genetically modified alfalfa includes Roundup Ready Alfalfa (RRA), which tolerates herbicide.

In 2005, after completing a 28-page environmental assessment the United States Department of Agriculture (USDA) granted RRA nonregulated status under Code of Federal Regulations Title 7 Part 340, which regulates, among other things, the introduction (importation, interstate movement, or release into the environment) of organisms and products altered or produced through genetic engineering that are plant pests or that there is reason to believe are plant pests. Monsanto had to seek deregulation to conduct field trials of RRA, because the RRA contains a promoter sequence derived from the plant pathogen figwort mosaic virus.

The USDA granted the application for deregulation, stating that the RRA with its modifications: "(1) Exhibit no plant pathogenic properties; (2) are no more likely to become weedy than the nontransgenic parental line or other cultivated alfalfa; (3) are unlikely to increase the weediness potential of any other cultivated or wild species with which it can interbreed; (4) will not cause damage to raw or processed agricultural commodities; (5) will not harm threatened or endangered species or organisms that are beneficial to agriculture; and (6) should not reduce the ability to control pests and weeds in alfalfa or other crops." Monsanto started selling RRA and within two years, more than 300,000 acres were devoted to the plant in the US.

The granting of deregulation was opposed by many groups, including growers of non-GM alfalfa who were concerned about gene flow into their crops. In 2006, the Center for Food Safety, a US non-governmental organization that is a critic of biotech crops, and others, challenged this deregulation in the United States District Court for the Northern District of California. Organic growers were concerned that the GM alfalfa could cross-pollinate with their organic alfalfa, making their crops unsalable in countries that ban the growing of GM crops. The District Court ruled that the USDA's environmental assessment did not address two issues concerning RRA's effect on the environment, and in 2007, required the USDA to complete a much more extensive environmental impact statement (EIS). Until the EIS was completed, they banned further planting of RRA but allowed land already planted to continue. The USDA proposed a partial deregulation of RRA but this was also rejected by the District Court. Planting of RRA was halted.

In June 2009, a divided three-judge panel on the 9th U.S. Circuit Court of Appeals upheld the District Court's decision. Monsanto and others appealed to the US Supreme Court.

On 21 June 2010, in Monsanto Co. v. Geertson Seed Farms, the Supreme Court overturned the District Court decision to ban planting RRA nationwide as there was no evidence of irreparable injury. They ruled that the USDA could partially deregulate RRA before an EIS was completed. The Supreme Court did not consider the District Court's ruling disallowing RRA's deregulation and consequently RRA was still a regulated crop waiting for USDA's completion of an EIS.

This decision was welcomed by the American Farm Bureau Federation, Biotechnology Industry Organization, American Seed Trade Association, American Soybean Association, National Alfalfa and Forage Alliance, National Association of Wheat Growers, National Cotton Council, and National Potato Council. In July 2010, 75 members of Congress from both political parties sent a letter to Agriculture Secretary Tom Vilsack asking him to immediately allow limited planting of genetically engineered alfalfa. However the USDA did not issue interim deregulatory measures, instead focusing on completing the EIS. Their 2,300-page EIS, published in December 2010, concluded that RRA would not affect the environment.

Three of the biggest natural food brands in the US lobbied for a partial deregulation of RRA, but in January 2011, despite protests from organic groups, Secretary Vilsack announced that the USDA had approved the unrestricted planting of genetically modified alfalfa and planting resumed. Secretary Vilsack commented, "After conducting a thorough and transparent examination of alfalfa ... APHIS [Animal and Plant Health Inspection Service] has determined that [RRA] is as safe as traditionally bred alfalfa." About 20 million acres (8.1 million hectares) of alfalfa were grown in the US, the fourth-biggest crop by acreage, of which about 1% were organic. Some biotechnology officials forecast that half of the US alfalfa acreage could eventually be planted with GM alfalfa.

The National Corn Growers Association, the American Farm Bureau Federation, and the Council for Biotech Information warmly applauded this decision. Christine Bushway, CEO of the Organic Trade Association, said, "A lot of people are shell-shocked. While we feel Secretary Vilsack worked on this issue, which is progress, this decision puts our organic farmers at risk." The Organic Trade Association issued a press release in 2011 saying that the USDA recognized the impact that cross-contamination could have on organic alfalfa and urged them to place restrictions to minimize any such contamination. However, organic farming groups, organic food outlets, and activists responded by publishing an open letter saying that planting the "alfalfa without any restrictions flies in the face of the interests of conventional and organic farmers, preservation of the environment, and consumer choice". In addition to House Agriculture Committee Chairman Frank Lucas, Senator Debbie Stabenow (Chairwoman of the Senate Agriculture Committee) and Senator Richard Lugar strongly supported the decision, respectively stating that it would give growers "the green light to begin planting an abundant, affordable and safe crop" and give farmers and consumers the "choice ... in planting or purchasing food grown with GM technology, conventionally, or organically". In a joint statement, US Senator Patrick Leahy and Representative Peter DeFazio said the USDA had the "opportunity to address the concerns of all farmers", but instead "surrender[ed] to business as usual for the biotech industry".

In March 2011, the non-profit Center for Food Safety appealed the deregulation decision, which the District Court for Northern California rejected in 2012.

== Safety concerns ==
Alfalfa sprouts may contain microbiological pathogens, mainly from Salmonella or E. coli, which have caused numerous food product recalls and illness outbreaks, putting sprouts into a "high risk" category for food safety. People with weakened immune systems, such as the elderly, pregnant women, or those taking prescription drugs affecting the immune system, should not eat sprouts.

With long-term human consumption of alfalfa seeds, several safety concerns and medication interactions may result, including possible reactions similar to lupus erythematosus, an autoimmune disease.

Other concerns are for women during pregnancy or breast-feeding, hormone-sensitive conditions (such as breast, uterine, and ovarian cancers), and for people with diabetes. Alfalfa may interact with warfarin (e.g. Coumadin), birth control pills (contraceptive drugs), and estrogens.

=== Toxicity of canavanine ===
Raw alfalfa seeds and sprouts are a source of the amino acid canavanine. Much of the canavanine is converted into other amino acids during germination, so sprouts contain much less canavanine than unsprouted seeds. Canavanine competes with arginine, resulting in the synthesis of dysfunctional proteins. Raw unsprouted alfalfa has toxic effects in primates, including humans, which can result in lupus-like symptoms and other immunological diseases in susceptible individuals. Stopping consumption of alfalfa seeds can reverse the effects.

=== Phytoestrogens and effect on livestock fertility ===
Alfalfa, like other leguminous crops, is a source of phytoestrogens, including spinasterol, coumestrol, and coumestan. Because of this, grazing on alfalfa during breeding can cause reduced fertility in sheep and dairy cattle if not effectively managed.

Coumestrol levels in alfalfa have been shown to be elevated by fungal infection, but not significantly under drought stress or aphid infestation. Grazing management can be utilised to mitigate the effects of coumestrol on ewe reproductive performance, with full recovery after removal from alfalfa. Coumestrol levels in unirrigated crops can be predicted practically using weather variables.

== Nutrition ==
Raw alfalfa seed sprouts are 93% water, 2% carbohydrates, 1% fat, and 4% protein. In a reference amount of 100 g (3.5 oz), raw sprouts supply 23 calories and a rich content of vitamin K (25% of the Daily Value, table).

Alfalfa seeds, sprouted, raw
Nutritional value per 100 g (3.5 oz)
- Energy: 96 kJ (23 kcal)
- Carbohydrates: 2.1 g
- Dietary fiber: 1.9 g
- Fat: 0.7 g
- Protein: 4 g
Vitamins and minerals
Vitamins	Quantity %DV^{†}
Thiamine (B1)	6% 0.076 mg
Riboflavin (B2)	10% 0.126 mg
Niacin (B3)	3% 0.481 mg
Pantothenic acid (B5)	11% 0.563 mg
Vitamin B6	2% 0.034 mg
Folate (B9)	9% 36 μg
Vitamin C	9% 8.2 mg
Vitamin K	25% 30.5 μg
Minerals	Quantity %DV^{†}
Calcium	2% 32 mg
Iron	5% 0.96 mg
Magnesium	6% 27 mg
Manganese	8% 0.188 mg
Phosphorus	6% 70 mg
Potassium	3% 79 mg
Sodium	0% 6 mg
Zinc	8% 0.92 mg
- Other constituents: Quantity
- Water: 93 g
- Link to USDA Database entry
- ^{†}Percentages estimated using US recommendations for adults, except for potassium, which is estimated based on expert recommendation from the National Academies.

=== Sprouts ===
Sprouting alfalfa seeds is the process of germinating seeds at the immature stage for use as a garnish on various food preparations, such as salads. Although sprouts may be grown in soil, they are more commonly germinated in a soilless medium using drums, trays or racks.

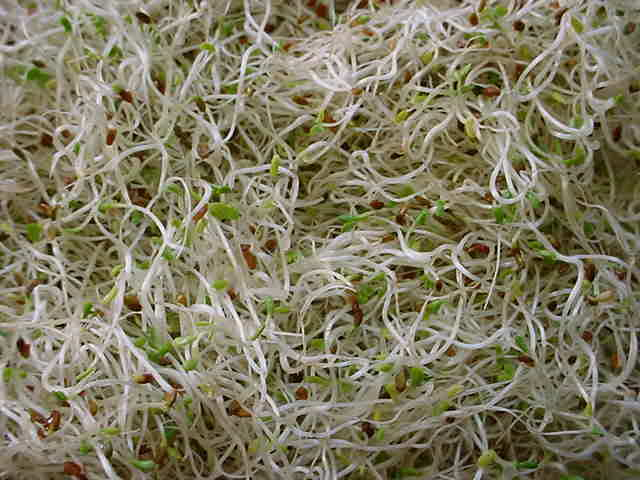
Close up of alfalfa sprouts

== See also ==
- Cover crop
- Green manure
