= Monsanto Co. v. Geertson Seed Farms =

- Supreme Court of the United States

Argued April 27, 2010 Decided June 21, 2010
- Full case name: Monsanto Co., et al. v. Geertson Seed Farms, et al.
- Docket no.: 09-475
- Citations: 561 U.S. 139 (more) 130 S. Ct. 2743; 177 L. Ed. 2d 461

Case history
- Prior: Geertson Seed Farms v. Johanns, 570 F.3d 1130 (9th Cir. 2009); cert. granted, 558 U.S. 1142 (2010).

Holding
- The plaintiffs in this case had standing, and the district court abused its discretion by entering a nationwide injunction.

Court membership
- Chief Justice John Roberts Associate Justices John P. Stevens · Antonin Scalia; Anthony Kennedy · Clarence Thomas; Ruth Bader Ginsburg · Stephen Breyer; Samuel Alito · Sonia Sotomayor

Case opinions
- Majority: Alito, joined by Roberts, Scalia, Kennedy, Thomas, Ginsburg, Sotomayor
- Dissent: Stevens
- Breyer took no part in the consideration or decision of the case.

Laws applied
- National Environmental Policy Act; Plant Protection Act

Monsanto Co. v. Geertson Seed Farms, 561 U.S. 139 (2010), is a United States Supreme Court case decided 7-1 in favor of Monsanto. The decision allowed Monsanto to sell genetically modified alfalfa seeds to farmers, and allowed farmers to plant them, grow crops, harvest them, and sell the crop into the food supply. The case came about because the use of the seeds was approved by regulatory authorities; the approval was challenged in district court by Geertson Seed Farms and other groups who were concerned that the genetically modified alfalfa would spread too easily, and the challengers won. Monsanto appealed the district court decision and lost, and appealed again to the Supreme Court, where Monsanto won, thus upholding the original approval and allowing the seeds to be sold.

In 2005 the United States Department of Agriculture's Animal and Plant Health Inspection Service (APHIS) deregulated Monsanto's Roundup-ready alfalfa (RRA) based on an Environmental Assessment (EA) of Monsanto's RRA. In 2006, Geertson Seed Farm and others filed suit in a California district court against APHIS' deregulation of RRA. The district court disallowed APHIS' deregulation of RRA and issued an injunction against any new planting of RRA pending the preparation of a much more extensive Environmental Impact Statement (EIS). The court also refused to allow a partial deregulation.

After losing an appeal at the United States Court of Appeals for the Ninth Circuit, Monsanto and others appealed the decision to the U.S. Supreme Court in 2009. In 2010 the Supreme Court reversed the lower court's decision to bar partial deregulation of RRA pending completion of the EIS. They stated that, before a court disallow a partial deregulation, a plaintiff must show that it has suffered irreparable injury. "The District Court abused its discretion in enjoining APHIS from effecting a partial deregulation and in prohibiting the planting of RRA pending the agency’s completion of its detailed environmental review." The Supreme court did not consider the district court's ruling disallowing RRA's deregulation and consequently RRA was still a regulated crop waiting for APHIS' completion of an EIS. At the time, both sides claimed victory. This was the first ruling of the United States Supreme Court on genetically engineered crops.

== Background ==
As of 2010, alfalfa is the 4th largest cash crop and grows on approximately 20 million acres (81,000 km^{2}) of land throughout the United States. This crop is grown for two primary purposes; hay for livestock consumption and seed for future stock. Since alfalfa undergoes open pollination, many farmers that grow organic and commercial alfalfa were concerned about the potential for cross-pollination occurring between the genetically modified alfalfa and non-genetically modified alfalfa.

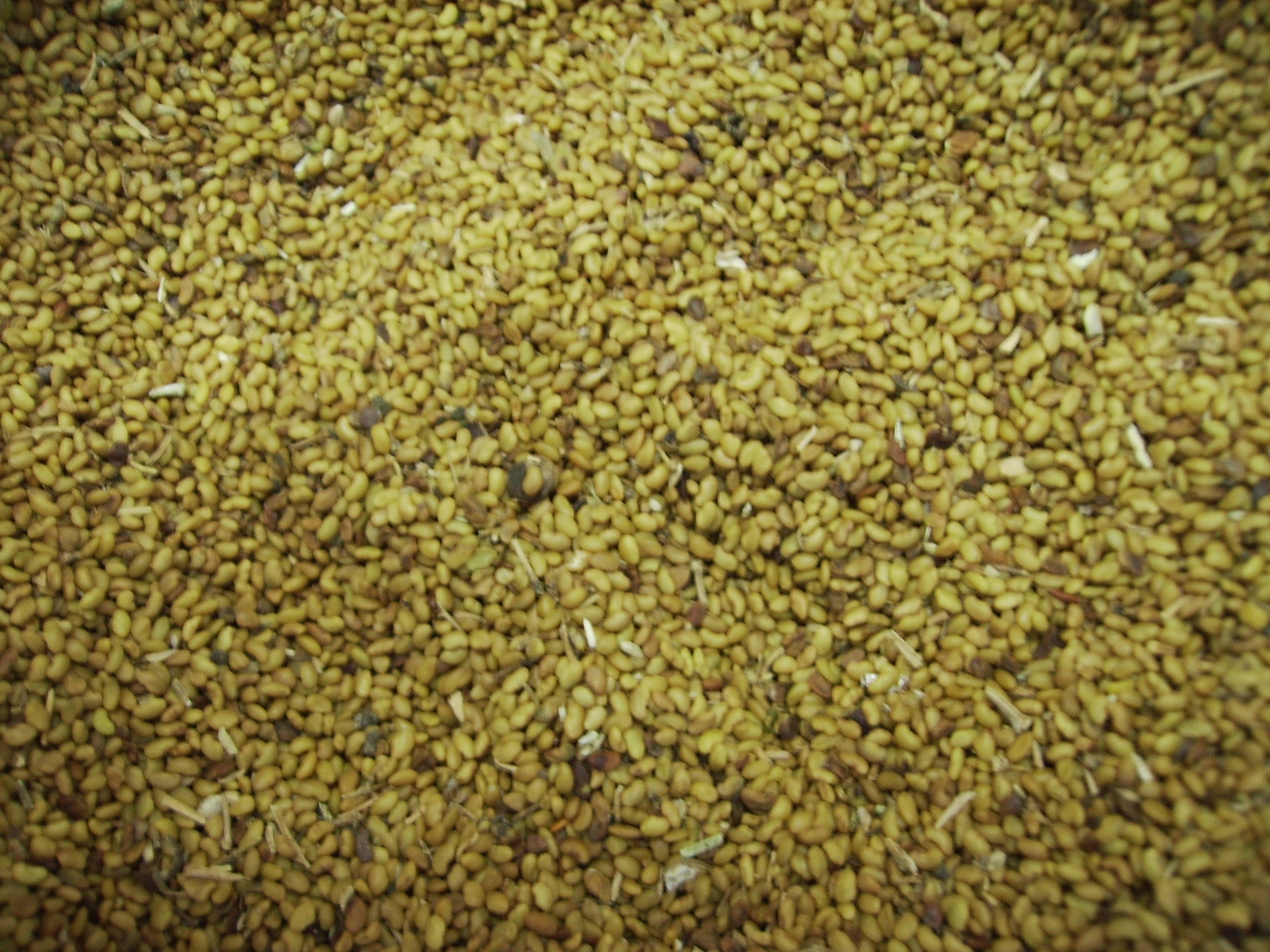
Alfalfa seeds

APHIS, a branch of the United States Department of Agriculture, has the right to regulate any organism and product that is altered or created by genetic engineering. They use the precautionary standard when addressing genetically modified organisms (GMOs). GMOs are classified as plant pests under the Plant Protection Act (PPA) and are therefore regulated articles. Anyone can choose to petition the regulated status of a GMO. APHIS is then required to perform an Environmental Impact Statement ( EIS) under the National Environmental Policy Act (NEPA). If, in an Environmental Assessment (EA), no significant environmental impact is found, then a full EIS is not required.

The petitioner, Monsanto, is the owner and licensor of the intellectual property rights to RRA, and licenses the technology to Forage Genetics, developer of the Roundup Ready alfalfa seed. In April, 2004, Monsanto petitioned APHIS for deregulation of RRA. APHIS has three options:

1. Take no action
2. Completely deregulate, requires a finding of "no significant impact"
3. Partially deregulate RRA, by imposing geographical restrictions

In 2005, APHIS prepared a draft Environmental Assessment and allowed for public comments. Of the total 663 comments only 137 were supportive of the APHIS decision to deregulate RRA. The 537 opponents were mainly organic and conventional farmers who feared that cross-pollination would occur and would have detrimental effects on the alfalfa market. APHIS released its EA, finding that RRA would not have any significant adverse impact on the environment. APHIS found that alfalfa is pollinated by bees and that pollination has been documented to occur up to 2 miles (3.2 km) from a pollen source. Therefore, it was highly unlikely RRA would have a significant impact on non-GMO/organic farms. In February 2006, plaintiffs (see parties below) filed suit stating that APHIS violated NEPA. Subsequently, the district court ruled that APHIS had failed to take a "hard look" at RRA and its potential for genetic contamination. Monsanto and Forage Genetics argued that many farmers had already purchased and planted or planned to plant RRA seeds for the new harvest. In order to allow the planting of seed already purchased, the court granted a preliminary injunction prohibiting the planting and sale of RRA after March 30, 2007, pending a permanent injunction. In April 2007 the permanent injunction was granted. In 2008 Monsanto and APHIS appealed to the Ninth Circuit, which upheld the decision of the district court. The defendants appealed, and on April 27, 2010 this case was argued in front of the United States Supreme Court.

=== Parties ===
This case arose from the 2005 decision made by the Animal and Plant Health Inspection Service (APHIS), an arm of the U.S. Department of Agriculture (USDA). APHIS ( the defendant) performs a variety of services and is tasked with both protecting and promoting U.S. agricultural health and regulating genetically modified organisms. APHIS has the authority to regulate any genetically engineered products that are plant pests or believed to be plant pests. Monsanto ( the defendant-intervenors), is a corporation that manufactures several different chemicals, including pesticides and herbicides. A problem arose when Monsanto applied for deregulation of two specific lines of its Roundup Ready Alfalfa. APHIS responded favorably to Monsanto's request, but the deregulation was put on hold when Geertson Seed Farms (an Oregon Company), Trask Family Seeds (a South Dakota business) and other environmental groups sought to permanently enjoin APHIS from deregulating RRA until a final Environmental Impact Statement was completed.

=== Granting of certiorari ===
Certiorari was granted January 15, 2010.

=== Issues ===
The Supreme Court limited its inquiry to whether the lower court had abused its discretion. Its analysis turned on the following questions:

1. Was Geertson exempt from having to show a likelihood of irreparable harm in order to obtain an injunction?
2. Did the District Court improperly grant the injunction without holding an evidentiary hearing to resolve disputed facts?
3. Did the court of appeals incorrectly affirm the injunction prior to the "remote possibility of reparable harm" standard articulated in Winter v. NRDC?

It was noted that no party challenged the fact that APHIS had violated NEPA and that vacating the deregulation was within the District Court's discretion.

== Decision ==
=== Standing ===
1. Respondents (Geertson) have standing to seek injunctive relief, and petitioners (Monsanto) have standing to seek this Court’s review of the Ninth Circuit’s judgment affirming the entry of such relief.

  (a) The Court held that Monsanto satisfied all three Article III requirements for standing to seek review of the lower court decision.
  (b) The Court affirmed the District Court's finding that Geertson had established a reasonable probability that their conventional alfalfa crops would be infected with the engineered Roundup Ready gene if RRA were completely deregulated.

2. The District Court abused its discretion by enjoining APHIS from effecting a partial deregulation and in prohibiting the planting of RRA pending the agency’s completion of its detailed environmental review.

  (a) The Court assumes that the District Court acted lawfully in vacating the agency’s decision to completely deregulate RRA, but addresses whether it overreached its authority by granting a nationwide injunction pending completion of the EIS process.
  (b) Geertson did not satisfy the four-factor test for a permanent injunction articulated in eBay Inc. v. MercExchange, LLC.
  (c) None of the four factors justified the District Court's decision prohibiting APHIS from "partially" deregulating RRA until completion of the EIS.
  (d) A nationwide injunction was too drastic a remedy given the facts and the District Court's refusal to consider partial deregulation.

=== District Court's Injunction ===
The Supreme Court stated that the District Court only considered a complete deregulation of RRA pending the completion of an EIS by APHIS. The four-factor test for granting a permanent injunction:

1. The plaintiff has to have suffered an irreparable injury.
2. The remedies available by law are inadequate to compensate for that injury.
3. The court needs to consider the balance of hardship between the plaintiff and the defendant.
4. The public interest would not be harmed by this permanent injunction.

The Supreme Court ruled that the District Court erred by imposing a nationwide injunction, banning APHIS from partially deregulating RRA because all four factors could not be met, particularly, the irreparable injury factor. It was also held that a NEPA violation does not warrant automatic injunctive relief.

The Supreme Court also stated that if a partial deregulation presented further danger to the respondents, they may file another suit for injunctive relief. And the respondents could not prove that partial deregulation would cause irreparable harm.

In addition, the Supreme Court found that the District Court further erred in issuing injunctive relief because it preempted APHIS' ability to enact a partial deregulation that may not pose any appreciable risk of environmental harm. It was also held that because the District Court did not consider the use of a less extraordinary measure to relieve the injury claimed by Geertson, the injunction was inappropriate. The second factor, that there must be no other option available to the court to remedy the injury, could not be met because the vacatur would have prevented the complete deregulation.

== Dissent ==
In his dissent, Stevens wrote that the majority decision was based on an incorrect understanding of the District Court decision, namely, an understanding that "the District Court enjoined APHIS from partially deregulating RRA in any sense" and in doing so, the District Court had exceeded its authority. Stevens did not accept that reading, finding that the District Court's decision addressed "only (1) total deregulation orders of the kind that spawned this lawsuit, and (2) the particular partial deregulation order proposed to the court by APHIS." The majority's understanding and its implications were not the subject of briefs nor extended arguments, and Stevens therefore dissented because "the key legal premise on which the Court decides this case was never adequately presented. Of course, this is not standard — or sound — judicial practice.... Today’s decision illustrates why, for it is quite unclear whether the Court’s premise is correct, and the Court has put itself in the position of deciding legal issues without the aid of briefing."

In Stevens' dissent, he maintained that the injunction was warranted because there was a clear danger that cross-pollination could happen, even in controlled settings, and that APHIS's ability to regulate and prevent this contamination was limited.

== See also ==
- Monsanto Canada Inc. v. Schmeiser
- List of United States Supreme Court cases, volume 561
