= Genetically modified alfalfa =

Genetically modified alfalfa (Medicago sativa) is a genetically modified crop. Alfalfa is a perennial flowering plant in the legume family Fabaceae primarily used to feed livestock. It is the 5th most widely grown GM crop in global acreage. Most GM alfalfa grown is resistant to herbicides, specifically glyphosate-based herbicides, and has been sold as 'Roundup Ready'. As of 2020, GM alfalfa was grown in two countries - the United States and Canada. 20% of US-grown alfalfa was GMO by 2020 (vs greater than 90% for the other major GMO Crops - corn, soy, cotton, canola and sugar beets). Since 2016, a smaller percentage has been modified to contain less lignin, which can increase yield by extending the optimal harvest window.

In the United States, GM alfalfa was first approved for commercial planting from 2005 - 2007. Legal challenges from environmental groups and organic growers kept GM alfalfa seed off the market from 2007 - 2011. These legal challenges escalated to the 2010 Supreme Court case Monsanto Co. v. Geertson Seed Farms. The Supreme Court sided with Monsanto, allowing GM alfalfa to be farmed and sold, and US sales of GM alfalfa seed resumed in 2011. Canadian sales began in 2014.

== History ==
In the early 1990s researchers inserted genes into alfalfa using Agrobacterium tumefaciens. In 1999, Monsanto licensed the Roundup Ready gene to Forage Genetics, a subsidiary of Land O'Lakes agricultural cooperative.

In 2014, China refused shipments of American alfalfa after detecting traces of genetically modified material, and US alfalfa exporters suffered significant losses as a result.

From 2005-2016, all commercially grown GM alfalfa was the pesticide resistant 'roundup ready' type. In 2016, HarvXtra GM alfalfa was first planted commercially. This alfalfa has been modified to contain less lignin, giving the crop higher digestibility, and a longer time window for optimal cutting.

=== Growing history ===
GM Alfalfa was first permitted in the United States in 2005. More than 300,000 acres were planted in the US by 2007.

Planting was halted between March 2007 and 2011 due to legal challenges. Planting resumed in 2011, and by 2018, US farmers had planted 1,260,000 hectares of GM alfalfa, mostly glyphosate-resistant Roundup Ready (1,140,000 hectares Roundup Ready and 120,000 hectares HarvXtra).GM Alfalfa became available in Eastern Canada in 2014. By 2019, Canada had over 10,000 acres planted with 'HarvXtra' GM alfalfa, with the majority in Ontario. As of 2019, it was not available in Western Canada, in part due to concerns over its impact on the export seed market which relies on non-GM alfalfa seed.

=== Legal issues in the US ===
In 2005, the United States Department of Agriculture (USDA) granted Roundup Ready GM Alfalfa (RRA) nonregulated status Monsanto had to seek deregulation to conduct field trials of RRA, because the RRA contains a promoter sequence derived from the plant pathogen figwort mosaic virus. The USDA granted the application for deregulation, stating that the RRA with its modifications: "(1) Exhibit no plant pathogenic properties; (2) are no more likely to become weedy than the nontransgenic parental line or other cultivated alfalfa; (3) are unlikely to increase the weediness potential of any other cultivated or wild species with which it can interbreed; (4) will not cause damage to raw or processed agricultural commodities; (5) will not harm threatened or endangered species or organisms that are beneficial to agriculture; and (6) should not reduce the ability to control pests and weeds in alfalfa or other crops."

The granting of deregulation was opposed by many groups, including growers of non-GM alfalfa who were concerned about gene flow into their crops. In 2006, the Center for Food Safety, a US non-governmental organization that is a critic of biotech crops, and others, challenged this deregulation in the United States District Court for the Northern District of California. Organic growers were concerned that GM alfalfa could cross-pollinate with their organic alfalfa, making their crops unsalable in countries that ban GM imports. The District Court ruled that the USDA's environmental assessment did not address two issues concerning RRA's effect on the environment, and in 2007, required the USDA to complete a much more extensive environmental impact statement (EIS). Until the EIS was completed, they banned further planting of RRA but allowed land already planted to continue.

In June 2009, a divided three-judge panel on the 9th U.S. Circuit Court of Appeals upheld the District Court's decision. Monsanto and others appealed to the US Supreme Court.

On 21 June 2010, in Monsanto Co. v. Geertson Seed Farms, the Supreme Court overturned the District Court decision to ban planting RRA nationwide as there was no evidence of irreparable injury. They ruled that the USDA could partially deregulate RRA before an EIS was completed. The Supreme Court did not consider the District Court's ruling disallowing RRA's deregulation and consequently RRA was still a regulated crop waiting for USDA's completion of an EIS. In December 2010, the USDA published a 2,300-page EIS, which concluded that RRA would not affect the environment.

In January 2011, the USDA had approved unrestricted planting of genetically modified alfalfa and planting resumed. Secretary Vilsack commented, "After conducting a thorough and transparent examination of alfalfa ... APHIS [Animal and Plant Health Inspection Service] has determined that Roundup Ready alfalfa is as safe as traditionally bred alfalfa."

In March 2011, the non-profit Center for Food Safety appealed the deregulation decision.The District Court for Northern California rejected this appeal in 2012.
