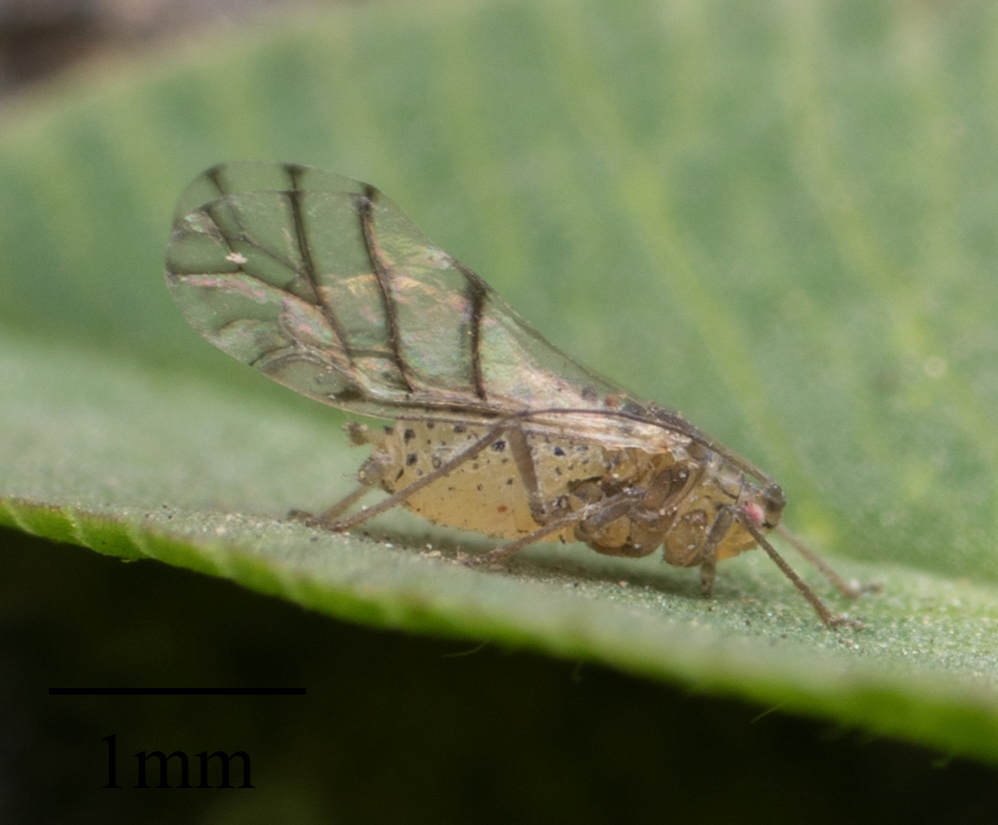

Scientific classification
- Domain: Eukaryota
- Kingdom: Animalia
- Phylum: Arthropoda
- Class: Insecta
- Order: Hemiptera
- Suborder: Sternorrhyncha
- Family: Aphididae
- Subfamily: Calaphidinae
- Tribe: Panaphidini
- Genus: Therioaphis
- Species: T. trifolii

Binomial name
- Therioaphis trifolii (Monell, 1882)

= Therioaphis trifolii =

Species of true bug

Therioaphis trifolii, the yellow clover aphid, is a species of aphid in the family Aphididae. It is found in Europe.

== Subspecies ==
These three subspecies belong to the species Therioaphis trifolii:

- Therioaphis trifolii albae Bozhko, 1959
- Therioaphis trifolii trifolii (Monell, 1882)
- Therioaphis trifolii ventromaculata Müller, 1968
