= National Association of Wheat Growers =

American agricultural advocacy group

Logo of the National Association of Wheat Growers.

The National Association of Wheat Growers (NAWG) is an advocacy group based in Washington, D.C. that supports the collective interests of wheat farmers in the United States.

NAWG was founded in 1950, and is structured as a federation of state grain growers associations.

It is affiliated with Wheat PAC, a political action committee, and National Wheat Foundation, a charitable organization.

The current chief executive officer is Chandler Goule.

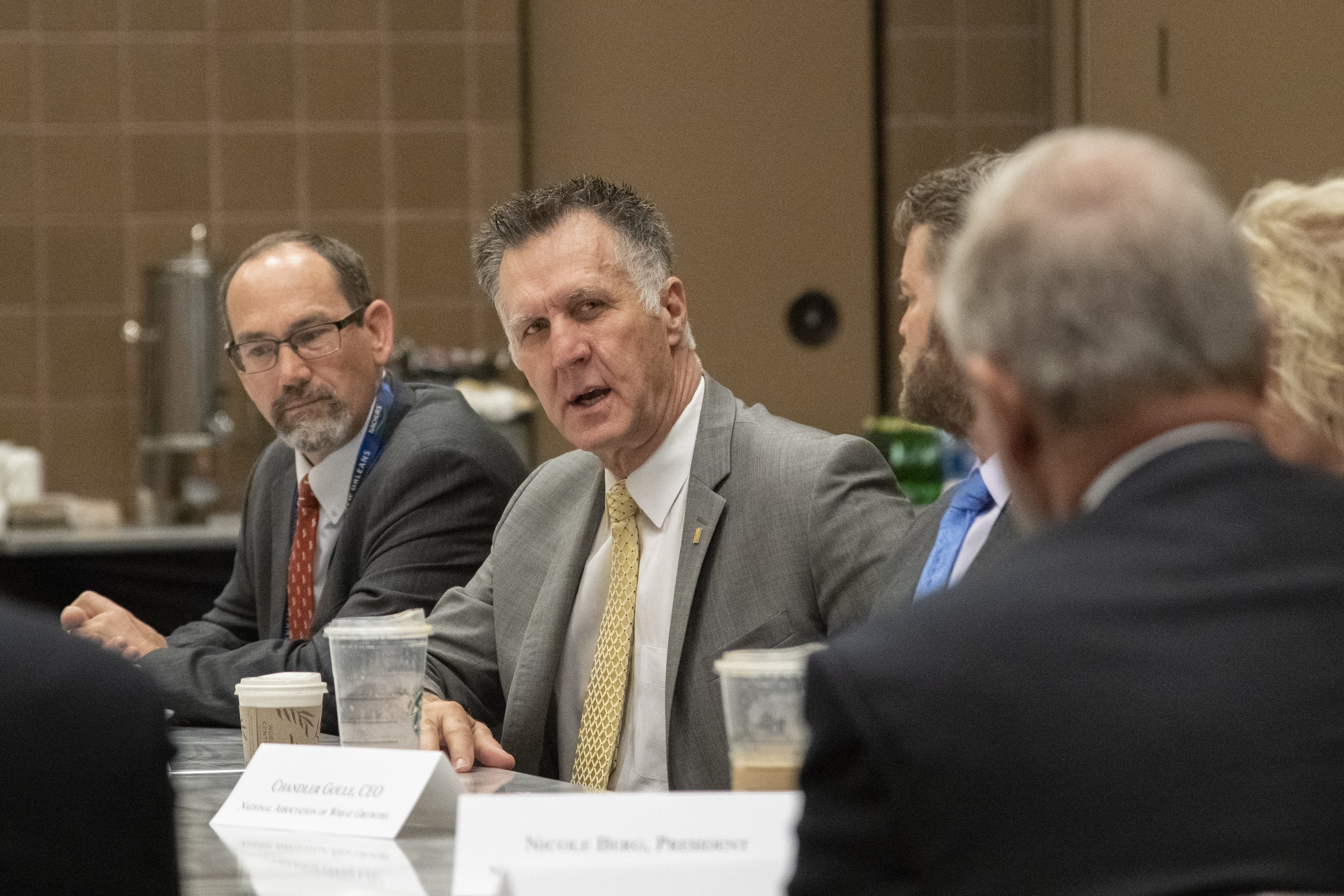
Goule in 2022
