= Therioaphis =

Scientific classification
- Kingdom: Animalia
- Phylum: Arthropoda
- Class: Insecta
- Order: Hemiptera
- Suborder: Sternorrhyncha
- Family: Aphididae
- Subfamily: Calaphidinae
- Tribe: Panaphidini
- Genus: Therioaphis; Walker, 1870

Genus of true bugs

Therioaphis is a genus of aphids in the family Aphididae. There are more than 20 described species in Therioaphis.

== Species ==
These 25 species belong to the genus Therioaphis:

- Therioaphis aizenbergi
- Therioaphis alatina Hille Ris Lambers & van den Bosch, 1964
- Therioaphis arnaultae Remaudière, 1989
- Therioaphis astragali
- Therioaphis azerbaidjanica Remaudière, 1989
- Therioaphis beijingensis Zhang, 1982
- Therioaphis bonjeaniae Hille Ris Lambers & van den Bosch, 1964
- Therioaphis brachytricha Hille Ris Lambers & van den Bosch, 1964
- Therioaphis dorycnii (Pintera, 1956)
- Therioaphis hungarica Szelegiewicz, 1969
- Therioaphis kermanica Remaudière, 1989
- Therioaphis khayami Remaudière, 1989
- Therioaphis kundurensis Quednau, 2003
- Therioaphis langloisi Remaudière & Leclant, 1968
- Therioaphis litoralis Hille Ris Lambers & van den Bosch, 1964
- Therioaphis loti Hille Ris Lambers & van den Bosch, 1964
- Therioaphis luteola (Börner, 1949)
- Therioaphis maculata
- Therioaphis natricis Hille Ris Lambers & van den Bosch, 1964
- Therioaphis obscura Hille Ris Lambers & van den Bosch, 1964
- Therioaphis ononidis (Kaltenbach, 1846)
- Therioaphis pteromaculata Quednau, 2003
- Therioaphis riehmi (Börner, 1949) (sweet clover aphid)
- Therioaphis subalba Börner, 1949
- Therioaphis tenera (Aizenberg, 1956)
- Therioaphis trifolii (Monell, 1882) (yellow clover aphid)
